= Association Royale des Descendants des Lignages de Bruxelles =

- Company type: ASBL
- Founded: 1961
- Headquarters: Brussels
- Website: lignagesdebruxelles.be

The Association Royale des Descendants des Lignages de Bruxelles (French) (Dutch: Koninklijke Vereniging der Afstammelingen van de Brusselse Geslachten; lit. 'Royal Association of the Descendants of the Lineages of Brussels') is a hereditary organization of individuals who have documented their descent from at least one member of the Seven Noble Houses of Brussels.

== History ==
Like the nobility, the Seven Noble Houses (or lineages) of Brussels were abolished during the French occupation. But whereas the nobility was officially recognised after the Belgian revolution of 1830, the lineages of Brussels were not. The Association was founded in 1961 as an asbl (non-profit) with the aim of bringing the descendants of the Seven Noble Houses together.

== Activities ==
The descendants of the Seven Noble Houses are currently united within this organization which perpetuates their existence and their rituals dating back to the Middle Ages. For example, every year, the organisation takes an active part in the organization of the Ommegang.

== Publications ==
The organization's main publications are:

- Les filiations lignagères: a yearly genealogical publication that shows the lineage of members back to their ancestors who held positions as members the Seven Noble Houses;
- Le Valet: a quarterly periodic that keeps members up to date on the activities and news of the association;
- Le Bulletin.

== Post-nominal letters ==
People officially admitted to the Association are entitled to use the following post-nominal letters: PB (Patricius Bruxellensis) for all members and NPB (Nobilis Patricius Bruxellensis) in case they are members of the Belgian nobility.

== Gallery ==
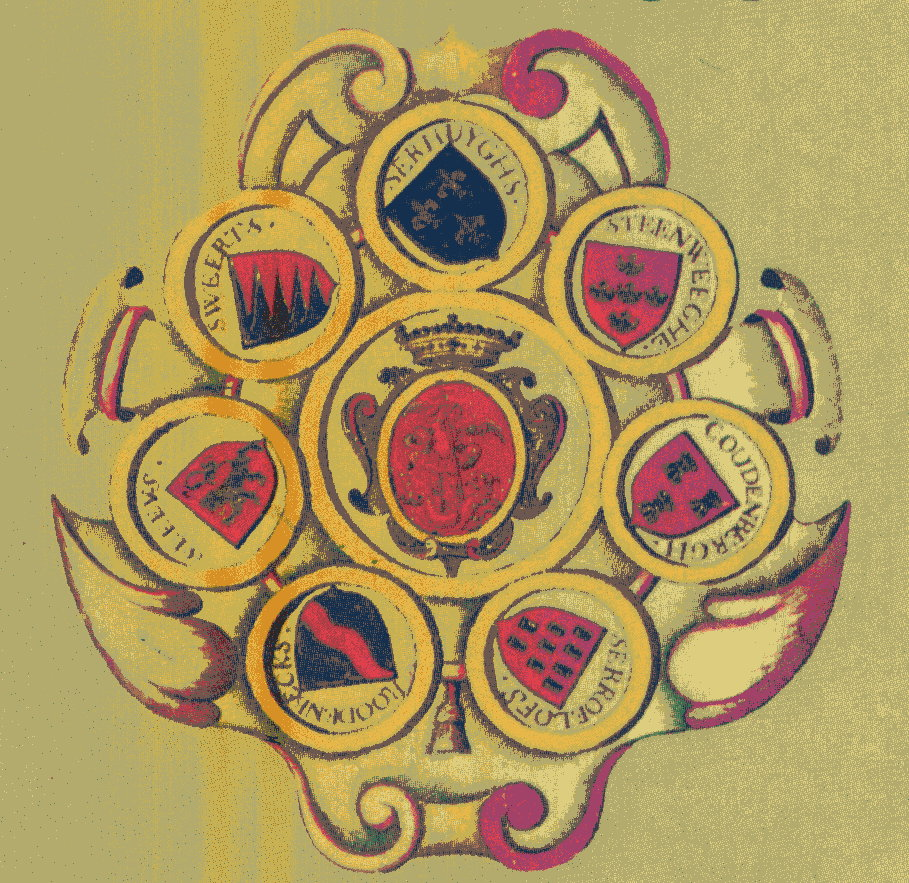
Coats of arms of the Seven Noble Houses on a manuscript from the 18th century.

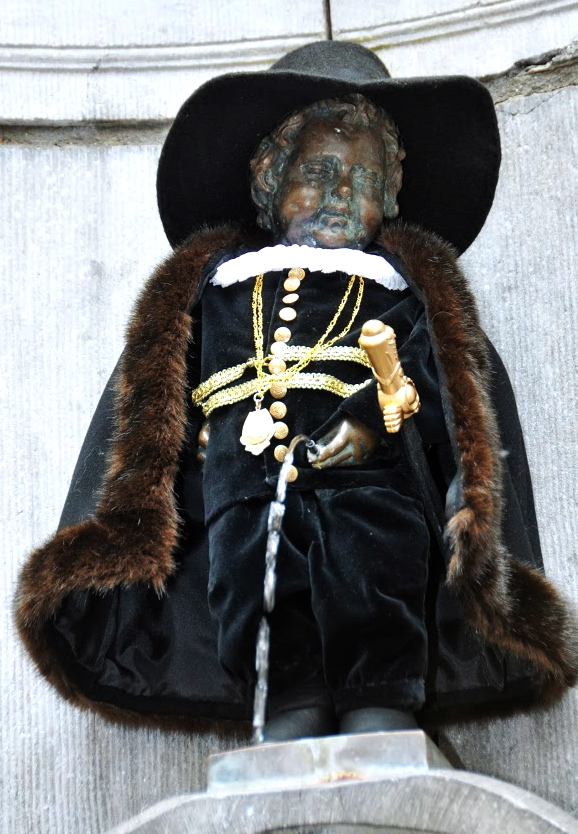
Manneken Pis dressed as a burgomaster from the Seven Noble Houses of Brussels. The costume was gifted by the Association in 2013.

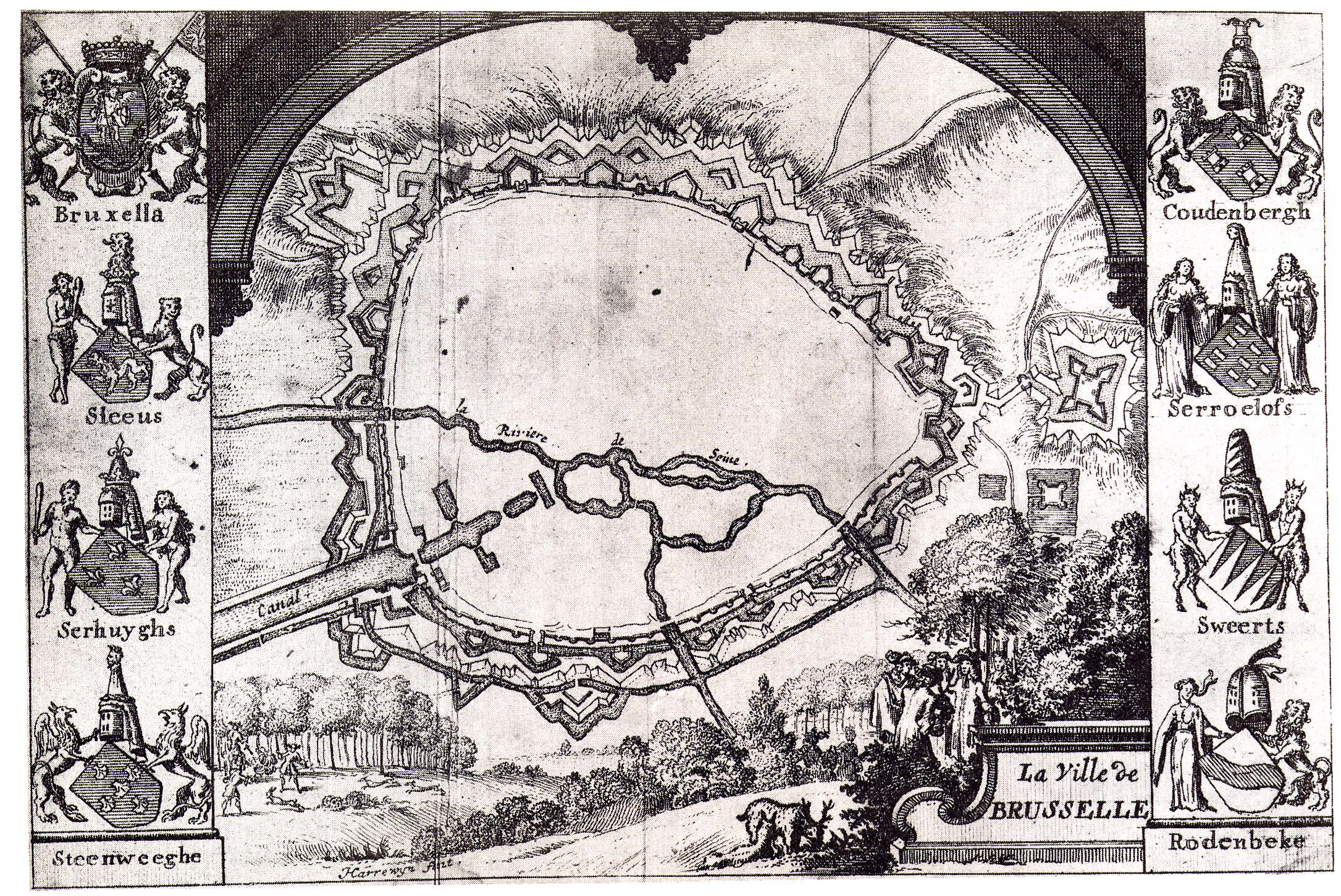
Map of Brussels with the Seven Noble Houses' coats of arms.

== See also ==
- List of hereditary and lineage organizations
- Genealogical and Heraldic Office of Belgium
- Seven Noble Houses of Brussels :
  - House of Sweerts
  - House of Sleeus
  - House of Coudenbergh
  - House of Serhuyghs
  - House of Serroelofs
  - House of Roodenbeke
