= Pipenpoy family =

Pipenpoy family de Pipenpoy, Pipenpoi or Pypenpoy
- Blazon: Azure, three fleur-de-lis couped argent.
- Parent family: Seven Noble Houses of Brussels
- Country: Duchy of Brabant; Holy Roman Empire
- Place of origin: Brussels
- Founded: 13th century

The Pipenpoy family (/pɪpɒ̃pwə/), was an old and influential patrician family of Brussels which exercised public functions in the capital of the Duchy of Brabant until the end of the Ancien Régime. It died in 1832 with Catherine de Pipenpoy, who was 100 years old. Several of its members were admitted to the Seven Noble Houses of Brussels.

== Origins ==
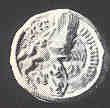
Seal of Peter Pipenpoy, alderman of Brussels.

The name Pipenpoi, Pipenpoy or Pypenpoy, which appeared in Brussels in the 13th century, is that of an important family of the urban aristocracy of bourgeois origin.

Guillaume Pipenpoi, deceased before 1253, quoted as bourgeois of Brussels (poorter) and alderman of Brussels in 1227-1230, is the first known representative. He occupied a steen, or fortified house, called the Cantersteen, the "steen of the cantor", located at the corner of the current rue de la Madeleine and rue de l'Empereur.

== Genealogy ==
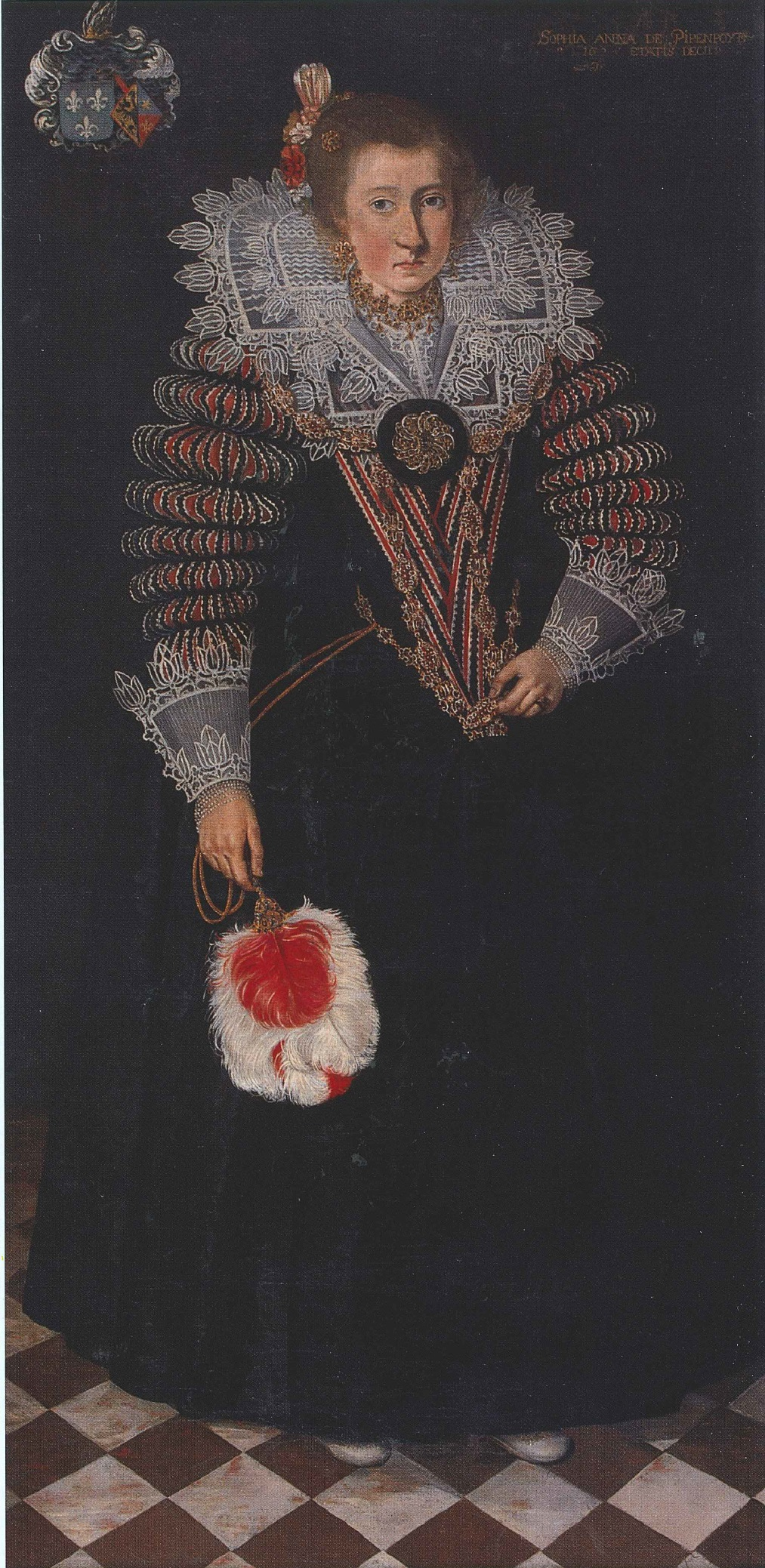
Sophia Anna Pipenpoy, dame de Merchten, épouse en premières noces de Wytze van Cammingha et en secondes noces, après le décès de son mari, de Johan Albrecht comte de Schellard van Obbendorp, dont elle divorça. Sophia Anna Pipenpoy mourut sans enfants dans son domaine de Liauckama State en Frise le 20 novembre 1670. (Musée de Frise).

This family had many branches whose main branch can be established as such:

I. Guillaume (Willem) Pipenpoy, was bailiff of Gaasbeek, who wore the banner of the Lord of Gaasbeek and fought alongside the John I Duke of Brabant at the Battle of Worringen in 1288. He was also vassal of Robert de Grimbergen, lord of Asse, and of Godfrey of Brabant, lord of Aerschot and Vierzon, brother of John I Duke of Brabant. He had a political career and was alderman of Brussels in 1287, 1290, 1297, 1302 and 1306. He became an amman of Brussels in 1300.
II. Wautier Pipenpoy, alderman in 1301, 1314, 1316, 1318, 1322, 1326, also amman of Brussels in 1318 et 1319.
III. Wautier Pipenpoy, alderman of the Serhuyghs House en 1331, 1333, 1336, 1337 and amman in 1341, 1349. He married Catherine Boote.
IV. Gysbrecht Pipenpoy, dead in 1394 treasurer of the city of Brussels in 1372, was alderman of the Roodenbeke House in 1380 and 1388 then dean of the Gilde of the drapery. He had married Marie Swaef, who died in 1418. Issue :

a) Jean Pipenpoy who follows under V.
b) Gysbrecht Pipenpoy, lord of Coninxsteen, amman of Brussels in 1416, married Catherine van Nedervelde. Their issue includes Elisabeth Pipenpoy who married Guillaume Halfhuys.

V. Jean Pipenpoy, born about 1387, alderman of Brussels in 1462, married Marguerite van de Voorde, daughter of Jean and Clémentine de Gaesbeek, natural daughter of Sweder d'Abcoude, lord of Gaasbeek.
VI. Guillaume (Willem) Pipenpoy, alderman of Brussels in 1468 then treasurer in 1483, married Catherine de Buttere dit Haecman.

VII. Jean Pipenpoy, died in 1532, alderman of Brussels of the Serhuyghs House, in 1504, lord of Bossuyt, married Gertrude Bosch. Their armored tombstone is still visible in the church of Sint-Martens-Lennik.
VIII. Jean Pipenpoy, died in 1553, married Cornelia van Overstraeten. They are represented carved in low relief, on a beautiful gravestone still visible in the church of Sint-Martens-Lennik. They had among others:

a) Jean Pipenpoy, follows under IX.
b) (?) François Pipenpoy, son of precedents according to Nieuw Nederlandsch Biografisch Woordenboek, participated in the Compromise of Nobles (1566) during the revolt of the Netherlands. He is found in 1577 Lord of Ganlau, "grietman" of Hemelumer Oldevaert and drossard (drost) of Noordevold. His family moved to Friesland. His name and the descendants of this branch became Calvinist are not included in the genealogy published in The theater of the nobility of the Duchy of Brabant.

IX. Jean Pipenpoy, died in September 1615, married Elisabeth Goossens. Issue includes:
X. Zeger Pipenpoy, died in 1658, married Jeanne van Cutsem. Issue :

a) Henri Pipenpoy, no issue. He was according to The Nobility Theater of Brabant (1705), brewer with the sign of the Windmill (Hendrick Brouwer in den Wintmolen tot Brusse).

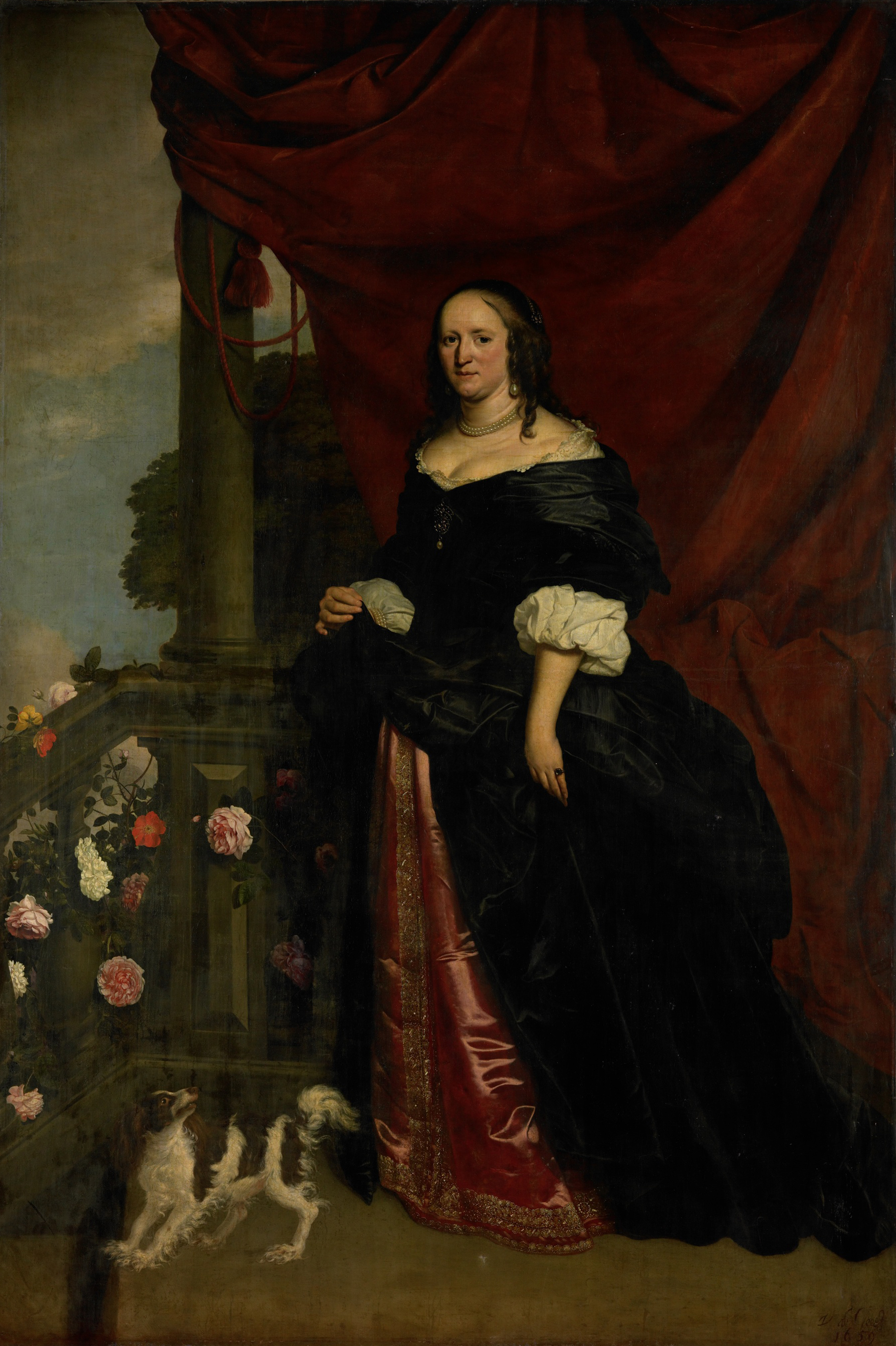
Presumed portrait of the same Sophia Anna van Pipenpoy (c.1618-1670), by Wybrand de Geest (Rijksmuseum Amsterdam). Branch of the Pipenpoys of Friesland.

b) Jacques Pipenpoy, following under XI.
c) Joannes Pipenpoy, Carthusian monk in Bruges.
d) Joanna Pipenpoy, married Laureys Roelofs.
e) Petronella Pipenpoy, married in a first marriage Sieur Jan t'Sas, and in a second Sieur Willem t'Kint.
f) Maria Pipenpoy, married in a first marriage Sieur Martin van der Schueren and in a second Sieur Josse t'Kint.
g) Anna Pipenpoy, married Tobias Crockaert.

XI. Jacques Pipenpoy, deceased in 1681, licensed in law, lawyer at the Sovereign Council of Brabant, admitted to the Sehuyghs House on July 28, 1649, alderman of Brussels of the Serhuyghs House in 1660, 1674, 1681, treasurer in 1673, married Anna vander Heyden, daughter of the clerk of Asse. Issue :
XII. Henry Pipenpoy, burgomaster of the City of Brussels in 1688, 1689, 1692, alderman in 1682, 1683, 1684, 1685, 1686, 1687, 1690 and 1691, then first resident of the city, married in first marriage Pétronelle Amelberge Baccart and in second marriage Thérèse Du Mont. Issue :

a) Jacques Jean Pipenpoy, following under XIII.
b) Isabelle Pipenpoy.

XIII. Jacques Jean Pipenpoy, écuyer, licensed in law.

== Chronological list of Pipenpoys admitted to the Seven Noble Houses of Brussels ==
- 1364 : Ghysbrecht Pipenpoy, alderman of the Roodenbeke House, married in 1364 Marie Swaef.
- 1544 : Jean Pipenpoy, knight (1547), burgomaster of the City of Brussels in 1556. admitted on 13 June 1544 to the Serhuyghs House.
- 1545 : Master Eustache Pipenpoy, alderman of Brussels in 1586 et 1587, admitted to the Sweerts House through his mother Barbe Was, daughter of Amelryck Was admitted to this House from 1483 to 1520, and Anna Daneels dite van Watermale. He died during the collapse of the theater (which miserabili theatri corruentis casu obiit) on July 20, 1587. Cited on 13 June 1545 in the Sweerts House.
- 1558 : Antoine Pipenpoy, cited on 13 June 1558 in the Serhuyghs House.
- 1567 : Pierre Pipenpoy, Lord of Merchtem, cited in 1567 in the Sleeus House.
- 1568 : Pierre Pipenpoy, Lord of Merchtem, admitted in 1568 in the Serhuyghs House.
- 1603 : Antoine Pipenpoy, admitted on 13 June 1603 to the Serhuyghs House. He is the son of Antoine Pipenpoy who was also admitted in the same House.
- 1649 : Jacques Pipenpoy, Law graduate and lawyer of the Brabant Council, had been admitted on July 28, 1649 to the Serhuyghs House after having supported a lawsuit against the commissioners of the Seven Houses who disputed his attachment to the old Pipenpoy of Brussels, this family having disappeared from the city since then two centuries. Her family had left Brussels as early as the middle of the fifteenth century, during the political upheavals against the patricians, and had settled in Sint-Martens-Lennik and Merchtem where she owned seigneuries. Pierre Pipenpoy, lord of Merchtem, alderman of Brussels in 1445, 1461, 1468, 1475 and 1477, was decapitated on March 13, 1477 paying with his life his fidelity to the deceased Charles the Bold.
- 1668 : Monsieur and Master ("Heer ende Meester") Henri Pipenpoy, Law graduate, admitted on 13 June 1668 to the Serhuyghs House.
- 1743 : Messire (Joncker) Jean-Joseph-Ghislain Pipenpoy, I.U.L., Joncker Jacobus' son Joannes Pipenpoy, admitted to the Seven Houses, and Isabella Papenbroeck. He was "octovir" of the Guild drapière of Brussels from 1751 to 1753 and chief-dean in 1757. He was admitted on June 13, 1743 to the Serhuyghs House.
- 1706 : Jacques-Jean Pipenpoy, Law graduate, son of Henri Pipenpoy who was burgomaster of the City of Brussels, and grandson of Jacques Pipenpoy also admitted to the Seven Houses, was alderman of Brussels in 1722 and 1730, and was admitted on June 13, 1706 to the Serhuyghs House.

== Bibliography ==
- Anonymous (Joseph Vanden Leene, king of arms of Brabant), Le théatre de la Noblesse du Brabant, Liège : chez Jean-François Broncaert, 1705 (Gives a Pipenpoy genealogy from Jean Pipenpoy and Gertrude Bosch. This genealogy will be completed and modified in the next edition of this book) Read online (Voir foliation Google Livres, pp. 681, 982, 684, 685, 700).
- Anonymous (Joseph Vanden Leene, king of arms of Brabant), Le théatre de la Noblesse du Brabant, Liège : at Jean-François Broncaert, 1705. (Revised and corrected edition, same year, where the genealogy Pipenpoy is modified and completed on title, starting with Wautier Pipenpoy, amman of Brussels in 1341, husband of Catherine Boete) Read online (See Google Books foliation, pp. 671 à 682).
- Jan Lindemans and Maurits Sacré, "Pipenpoy" in Oude Brabantse geslachten, n° 1, 1953.
- Philippe Godding, "Seigneurs fonciers bruxellois (ca. 1280-1450)", in : Cahiers bruxellois, Brussels, IV, 1959, pp. 194–223; V, 1960, pp. 1–17 et 85-113.
- Paul Leynen, "Philippe le Hardi arbitre une guerre privée entre les Pipenpoy et les Massemen", in : Les Lignages de Bruxelles, Brussels, 1980, n° 83-84, pp. 178–195.
- Raymond Delvaux, Flor De Smedt, Felix Meurisse and Frans Jozef van Droogenbroeck, Het Kasteel van Walfergem, van Hof te Huseghem over Speelgoed van de familie t'Kint tot Landhuis van de familie Delvaux, Asse : Koninklijke Heemkring Ascania, 2007. Pipenpoy and t'Kint families, pp. 157–177.
- René Laurent et Claude Roelandt, Les échevins de Bruxelles (1154-1500). Leurs sceaux (1239-1500), Brussels : Archives générales du Royaume, 2010, three volumes, passim.
- Paulo Charruadas Aux origines de l'aristocratie bruxelloise. Répertoire prosopographique (XIe - XIIIe siècle), Brussels : Archives de la Ville de Bruxelles, col. Studia Bruxellae, pp. 111–112 and passim.
- Roel Jacobs, "Pipenpoy, famille", in : Dictionnaire d'Histoire de Bruxelles, under the tutelage of Serge Jaumain, Brussels, 2013, p. 626.
- https://www.cairn.info/revue-histoire-urbaine-2008-1-page-49.htm Guillaume (Willem) Pipenpoy is mentioned on pages 20 and 22.

== Archival funds ==
- Office généalogique et héraldique de Belgique, Funds of Henry-Charles van Parys, n° 136. (XXIV-XXIX) « Liber Pipenpoy ». Contains six notebooks with evidence from Houwaert-De Grez funds (Cabinet des manuscrits de la Bibliothèque Royale de Belgique) about Pipenpoy family from du 15th to 17th centuries.

== See also ==
- Seven Noble Houses of Brussels
- Bourgeois of Brussels
- List of mayors of the City of Brussels
- Wittouck family
- t'Kint de Roodenbeke family
- Van Dievoet family

== Authority ==
Content in this edit is translated from the existing French Wikipedia article at fr:Famille Pipenpoy; see its history for attribution.
