= Ommegang of Brussels =

Medieval pageant in Brussels, Belgium

Ommegang of Brussels: Ommegang de Bruxelles (French); Ommegang van Brussel (Dutch)
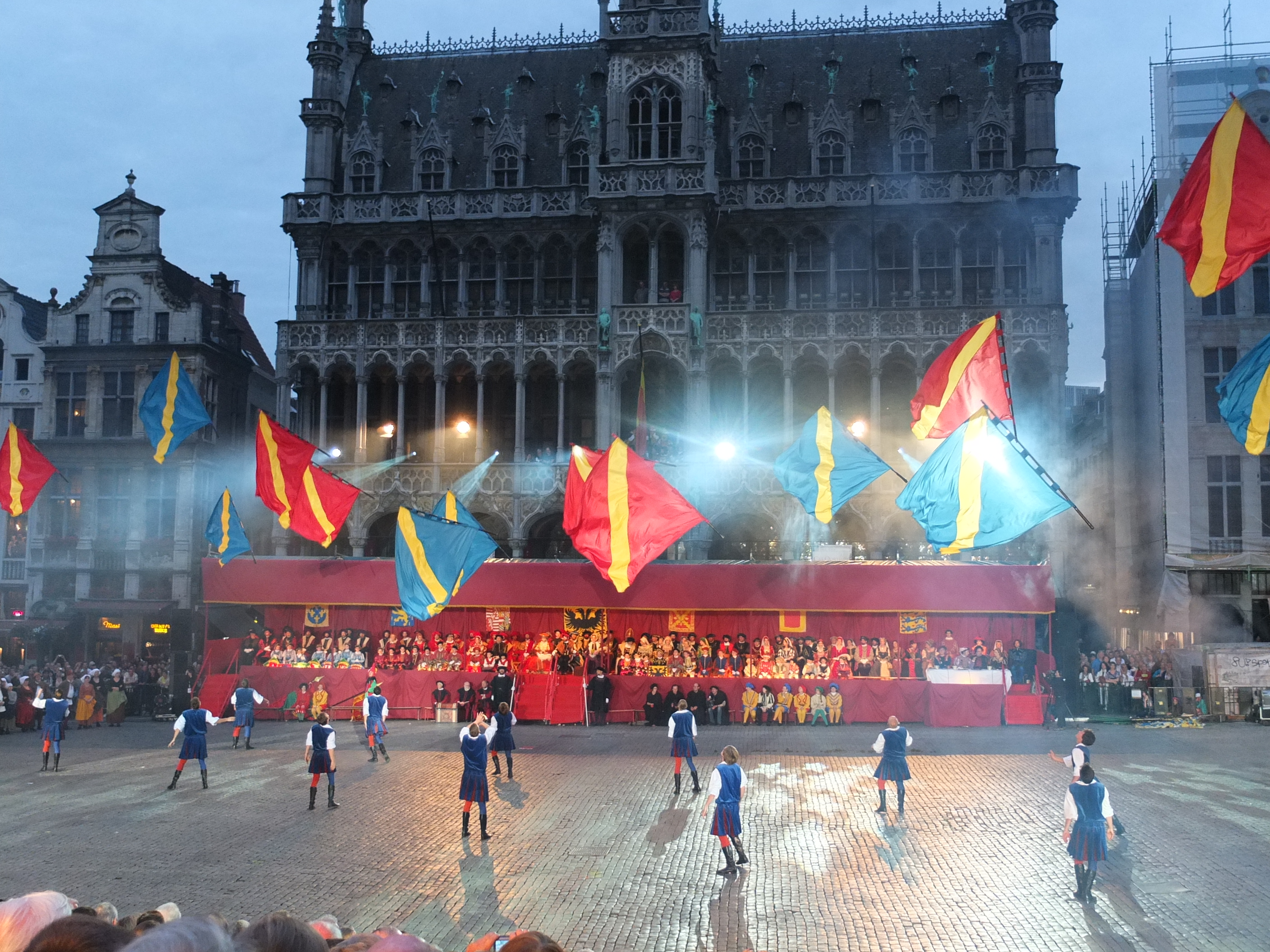
- Ommegang at the Grand-Place/Grote Markt
- Status: Active
- Frequency: Annual
- Locations: City of Brussels, Brussels-Capital Region
- Country: Belgium
- Inaugurated: 1930 (modern event)
- Most recent: 1 July 2026 and 4 July 2026
- Next event
- Participants: 1,400
- Website: www.ommegang.be

Ommegang of Brussels
- UNESCO Intangible Cultural Heritage
- Country: Belgium
- Reference: 01366
- Region: Europe and North America

Inscription history
- Inscription: 2019 (14th session)
- List: Representative

The Ommegang of Brussels (French: Ommegang de Bruxelles; Dutch: Ommegang van Brussel) is a traditional Ommegang, a type of medieval pageant, held annually in Brussels, Belgium. It is celebrated for its elaborate display and deep cultural significance.

Originating in the 14th century as Brussels' largest lustral procession honouring a miraculous statue of the Virgin Mary, the event gradually evolved into a civic spectacle involving all the city's constituents. Since 1930, it has taken the form of a historical reenactment of the Joyous Entry of Emperor Charles V and his son, Philip II, in the city in 1549. The colourful parade includes floats, traditional processional giants, and scores of folkloric groups, either on foot or on horseback, dressed in medieval garb. As such, it joins the wider tradition of processions of notable riders and giants found throughout Belgium and northern France.

The modern event takes place twice each year at the turn of June and July. It is organised by Ommegang Oppidi Bruxellensis, an association close to the City of Brussels. Its starting point is in the Sablon/Zavel district and it concludes with a large spectacle at the Grand-Place/Grote Markt (Brussels' main square). Since 2019, it has been recognised as a Masterpiece of the Oral and Intangible Heritage of Humanity by UNESCO.

== Etymology ==
The Dutch term Ommegang (originally spelled Ommeganck) means "moving around" or "walking around" (e.g. the church, village or city) and is an old historical evocation of Brussels' largest lustral procession, which took place once a year, on the Sunday before Pentecost. The term is similarly used as a generic name for various medieval pageants celebrated in the Low Countries (i.e. areas that are now within Belgium, the Netherlands, and Northern France).

The Ommegang in Brussels was originally an annual Christian procession held in honour of Our Lady of Victory, the city's powerful protector, whose statue is currently in the Church of Our Lady of Victories at the Sablon. The term thus evoked the act of "circumambulation" around a religious symbol (i.e. the Virgin Mary's statue), in Latin circumambulatio or amburbium, which can be found in many religions and beliefs. This Marian procession gradually acquired a more secular character, and became a major civic occasion involving local guilds, charitable fraternities, and urban institutions.

== History ==
=== Origins (c. 1348–1785) ===
According to legend, the origin of the Ommegang of Brussels goes back to a local devout woman named Beatrix (Béatrice or Beatrijs) Soetkens. She had a vision in which the Virgin Mary instructed her to steal the miraculous statue of Onze-Lieve-Vrouw op 't Stocxken ("Our Lady on the Little Stick") from the Cathedral of Our Lady in Antwerp, bring it to Brussels, and place it in the chapel of the Crossbowmen's Guild in the Sablon/Zavel district. The woman stole the statue, and through a series of miraculous events, was able to transport it to Brussels by boat in 1348. It was then solemnly placed in the chapel and venerated as the guild's patron. The guild also promised to hold an annual procession, called an Ommegang, in which the statue was carried through Brussels.

Through the following decades, what was originally a religious procession took on gradually a more worldly outlook. The Ommegang of 1549 corresponds to a golden age of the procession. From the mid-16th century, the Ommegang not only celebrated the miraculous legend, but from 1549, became intertwined with the Joyous Entry of Holy Roman Emperor, Charles V, and his son, Philip II, then-crown prince of the Seventeen Provinces of the Netherlands. On that occasion, Brussels' elites wished to honour the Emperor and his son by organising spectacular equestrian parades in the Sablon and on the Grand-Place/Grote Markt. The Ommegang thus developed into an important religious and civil event in the city's annual calendar.

During the second half of the 16th century, the Ommegang was dependent on political and religious upheavals in the Spanish Low Countries. The event was described at that time in the diary of a bourgeois of Brussels, Jan de Potter, who, over the years, mentions that it was sad, ugly or worse, that it did not take place. Between 1580 and 1585, when the city was in the hands of Calvinists, the procession was simply suppressed.

In the 17th century, the Ommegang regained its lustre, under the reigns of the Archdukes Albert VII and Isabella, sovereigns of the Spanish Netherlands, as depicted in a series of paintings by the court painters Denis van Alsloot and Antoon Sallaert, representing the celebrations of 1615. In the 18th century, the decline of the demonstration began. The last (very small) annual Ommegang took place in 1785, followed by only two sporadic performances in the 19th century.

Brussels' Ommegang of 1615

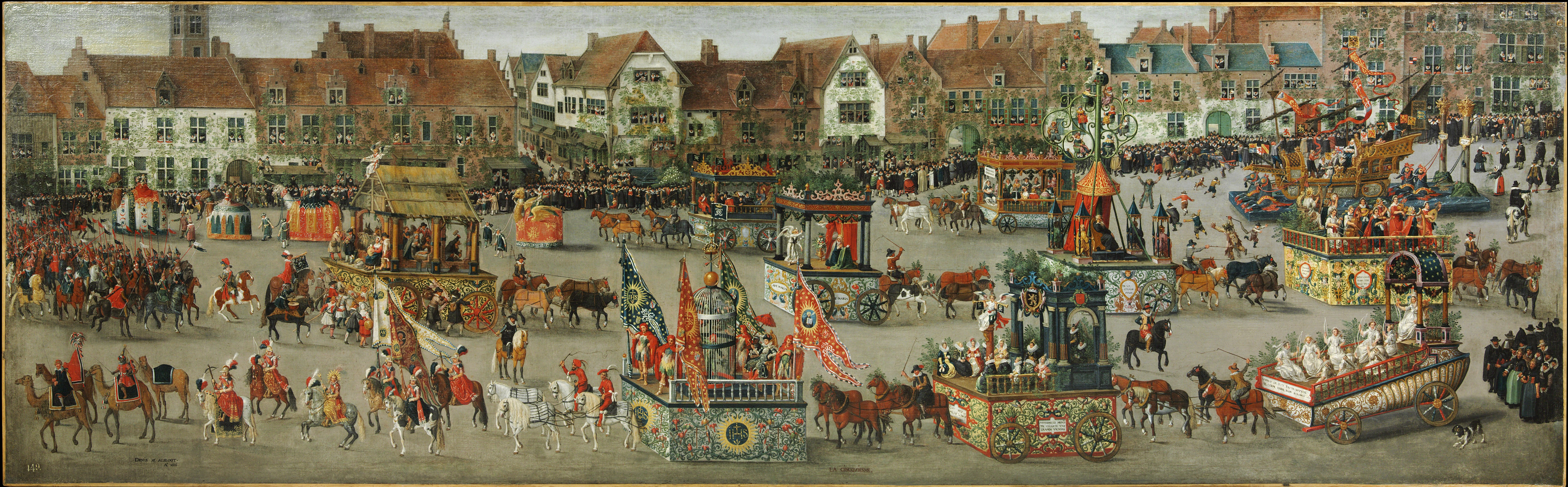
The Ommegang in Brussels on 31 May 1615. The Triumph of Archduchess Isabella, by Denis van Alsloot

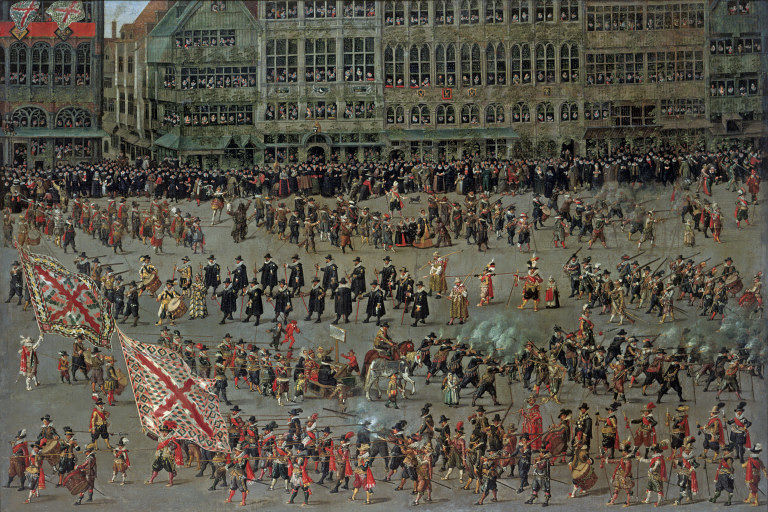
The Ommegang in Brussels on 31 May 1615. The Senior Guilds, by Denis van Alsloot

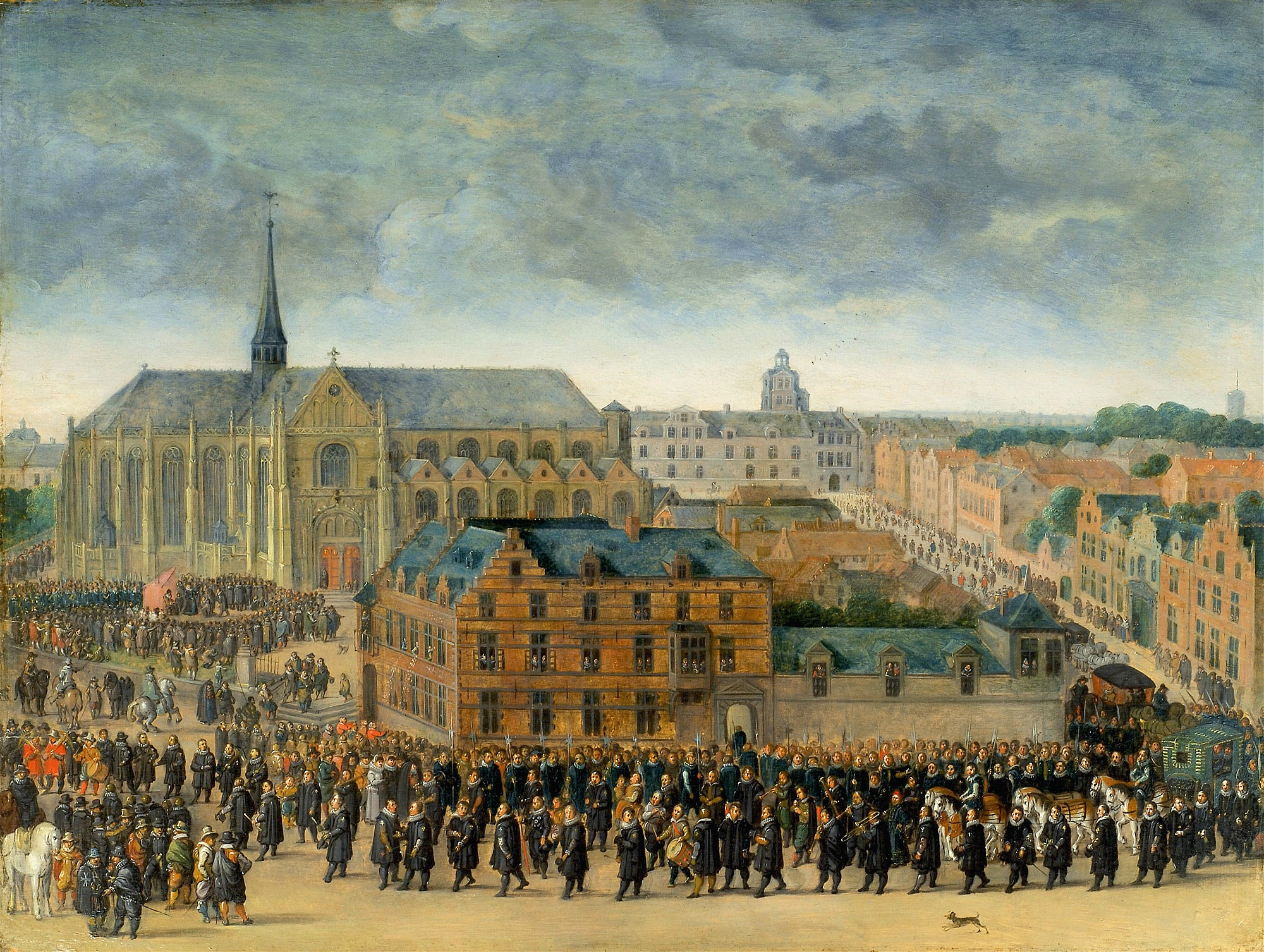
The Infanta Isabella shooting the Grand Serment bird with a crossbow at the Sablon during the Ommegang in Brussels of 31 May 1615, by Antoon Sallaert

=== Revival (1930–present) ===
For about a century, Brussels did not celebrate any Ommegang. In 1930, on the occasion of the centenary of the Belgian Revolution, some history enthusiasts supported efforts to commemorate once again the event, in the form of a historical procession. The organisers chose not to revive the ancestral "circumambulation", but to make it a spectacle reproducing the sumptuous Ommegang offered, in 1549, by the city of Brussels to Charles V and his son Philip II. Given the success of this performance, it was decided to repeat it in subsequent years. This was the origin of the current Ommegang.

The current event brings together about 1,400 extras, including several dozen horse riders, crossbowmen, archers, fencers, and arquebusiers, all dressed in period costumes. There are also stilt walkers and processional giants such as the archangel Saint Michael, Saint Gudula, and the Bayard horse. The magistrates and members of the Seven Noble Houses of Brussels, wearing the traditional Brussels red scarlet, preceded by a group of clergymen carrying the Virgin of Victories, also still participate in this sacred procession. Although it has become a historical pageant, the Ommegang retains many traditional and authentic elements, such as the presence of the Brussels Lineages, the Oaths of Crossbowmen, as well as the Virgin Mary's statue, and remains a major yearly event in Brussels' calendar.

Since 2011, a personality from the world of the arts is entrusted, each year, with the role of herald, and comments on the show at the Grand-Place. Jean-Pierre Castaldi, Stéphane Bern, Jacques Weber, Francis Huster, Éric-Emmanuel Schmitt, and Patrick Poivre d'Arvor, to name a few, have successively lent themselves to the exercise.

In 2017, the Ommegang was included in the inventory of intangible cultural heritage of the Brussels-Capital Region, and in 2019, it was recognised as one of the Masterpieces of the Oral and Intangible Heritage of Humanity by UNESCO. The event was cancelled in 2020 and 2021 due to the COVID-19 pandemic in Belgium.

The Emperor Charles V and crown prince Philip II in the modern Ommegang

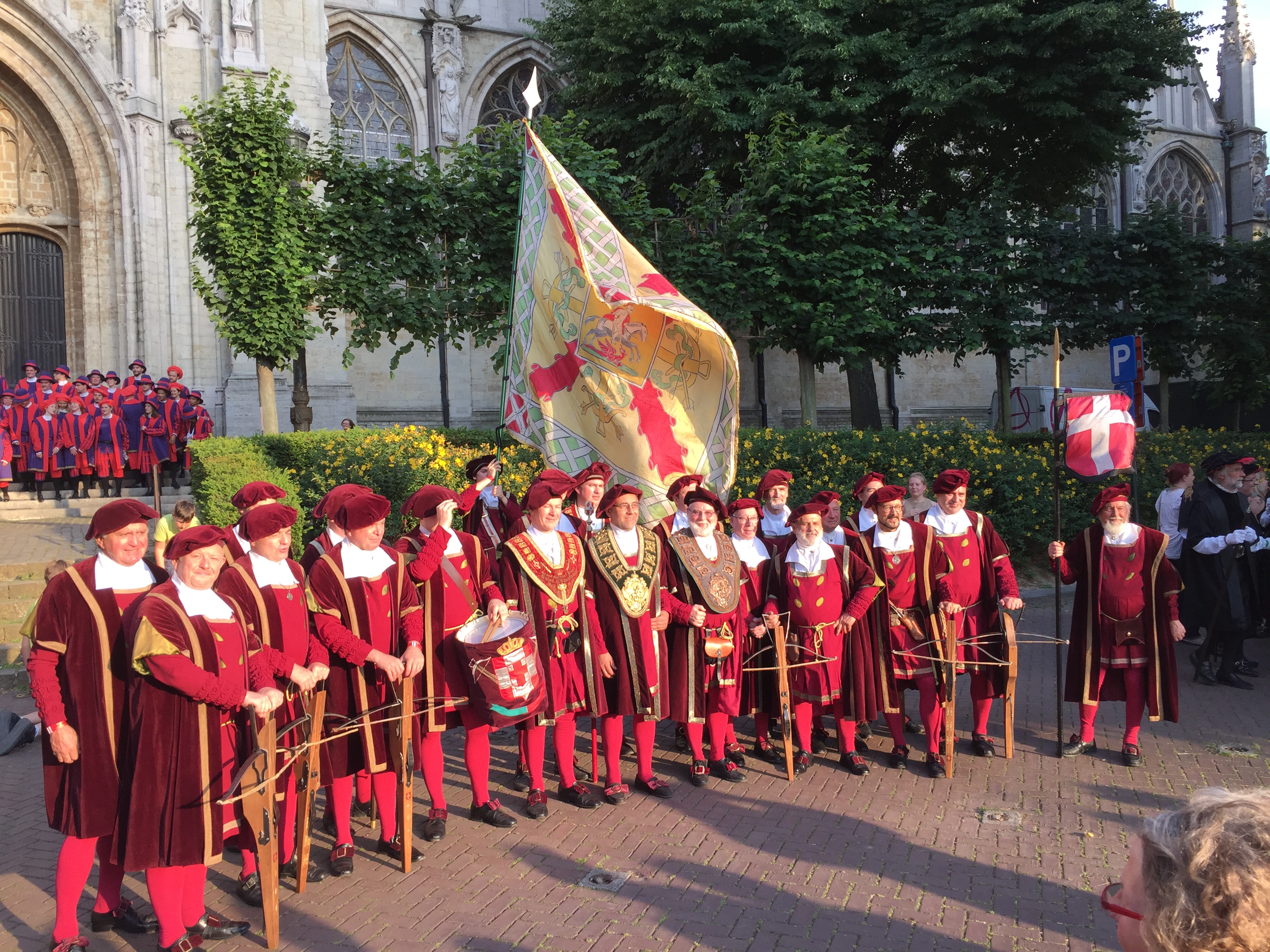
Grand Oath of Crossbowmen of Brussels participating in the Ommegang

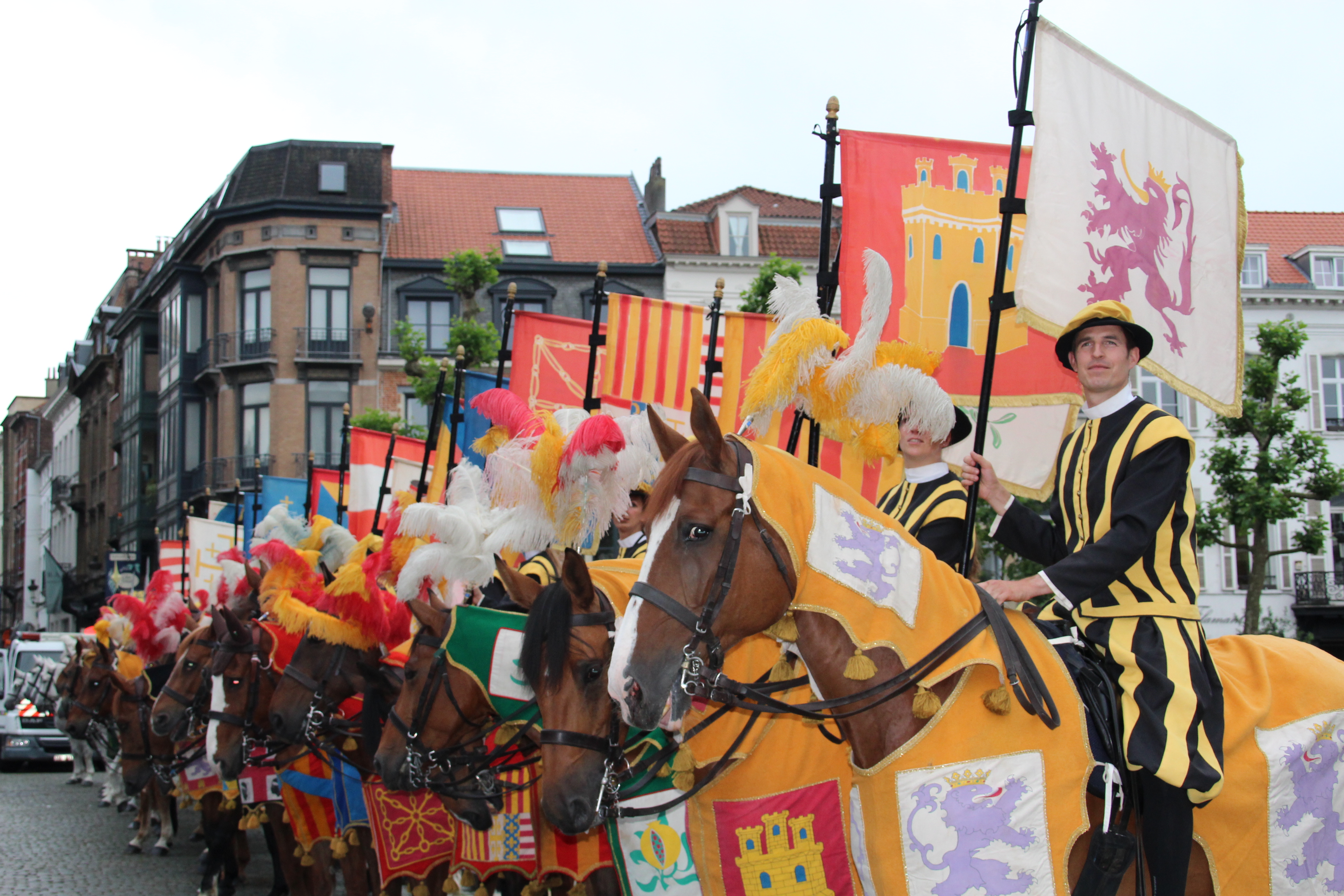
Noble riders honouring Emperor Charles V during the Ommegang

== See also ==
- Seven Noble Houses of Brussels
- Association Royale des Descendants des Lignages de Bruxelles
- History of Brussels
- Culture of Belgium
