= Poot family =

Poot
- Blazon: gules with three silver swords placed in bar points at the bottom.
- Parent family: Seven Noble Houses of Brussels
- Country: Duchy of Brabant
- Cadet branches: Baudier

The Poot family is a family that was admitted to the bourgeoisie of Brussels and from 1753 was registered among the Seven Noble Houses of Brussels.

== The seven noble houses of Brussels ==
The Seven Noble Houses of Brussels (French: sept lignages de Bruxelles, Dutch: zeven geslachten van Brussel) were the seven families of Brussels whose descendants formed the patrician class of that city, and to whom special privileges in the government of that city were granted until the end of the Ancien Régime.

The house from which the family descends:

- House of Sweerts

== Heraldry ==
Poot family

Struelens family

Poot family quartered with the arms of the Struelens family
Poot Baudier family

== Bibliography ==
- Jean-François Houtart, OGHB, Anciennes familles de Belgique, 2008, p. 397
- François met den Ancxt, Poot Baudier, in Recueil nobiliaire belge, volume I, 1911, p. 151.

== Authority ==
Content in this edit is translated from the existing French Wikipedia article at fr:Famille Poot; see its history for attribution.
