= Seven Noble Houses of Brussels =

Historic patrician families in Brussels, Belgium

- Country: Duchy of Brabant Burgundian Netherlands; Spanish Netherlands Austrian Netherlands
- Origin: Duchy of Brabant
- Founded: 1306 (restored) by John II
- Traditions: Civil, military, political and economic leadership
- Dissolution: 1794
- Cadet branches: Sleeus, Sweerts, Serhuyghs, Steenweeghs, Coudenbergh, Serroelofs, Roodenbeke
- Website: http://www.lignagesdebruxelles.be

The Seven Noble Houses of Brussels (also called the Seven Lineages or Seven Patrician Families of Brussels; French: Sept lignages de Bruxelles; Dutch: Zeven geslachten van Brussel; Latin: Septem nobiles familiae Bruxellarum) were the seven families or "lineages" whose descendants formed the patrician class and urban aristocracy of Brussels.

In the Middle Ages they formed a social class with a monopoly on the civil, military and economic leadership of the urban administration, with privileges that survived until the end of the Ancien Régime. However, as of the urban revolution of 1421, the representatives of the Guilds of Brussels also exercised similar offices. Still, the offices of aldermen and captains of the civic militias were reserved exclusively for members of the "Lineages".

The lengthy and rarely threatened supremacy of the Seven Houses of Brussels was based on a multitude of common interests they shared with the ducal dynasty of Brabant, as well as the successive Houses of Louvain, Burgundy and Habsburg. Together with the Guilds of Brussels, they comprised the freemen of the city.

== History ==
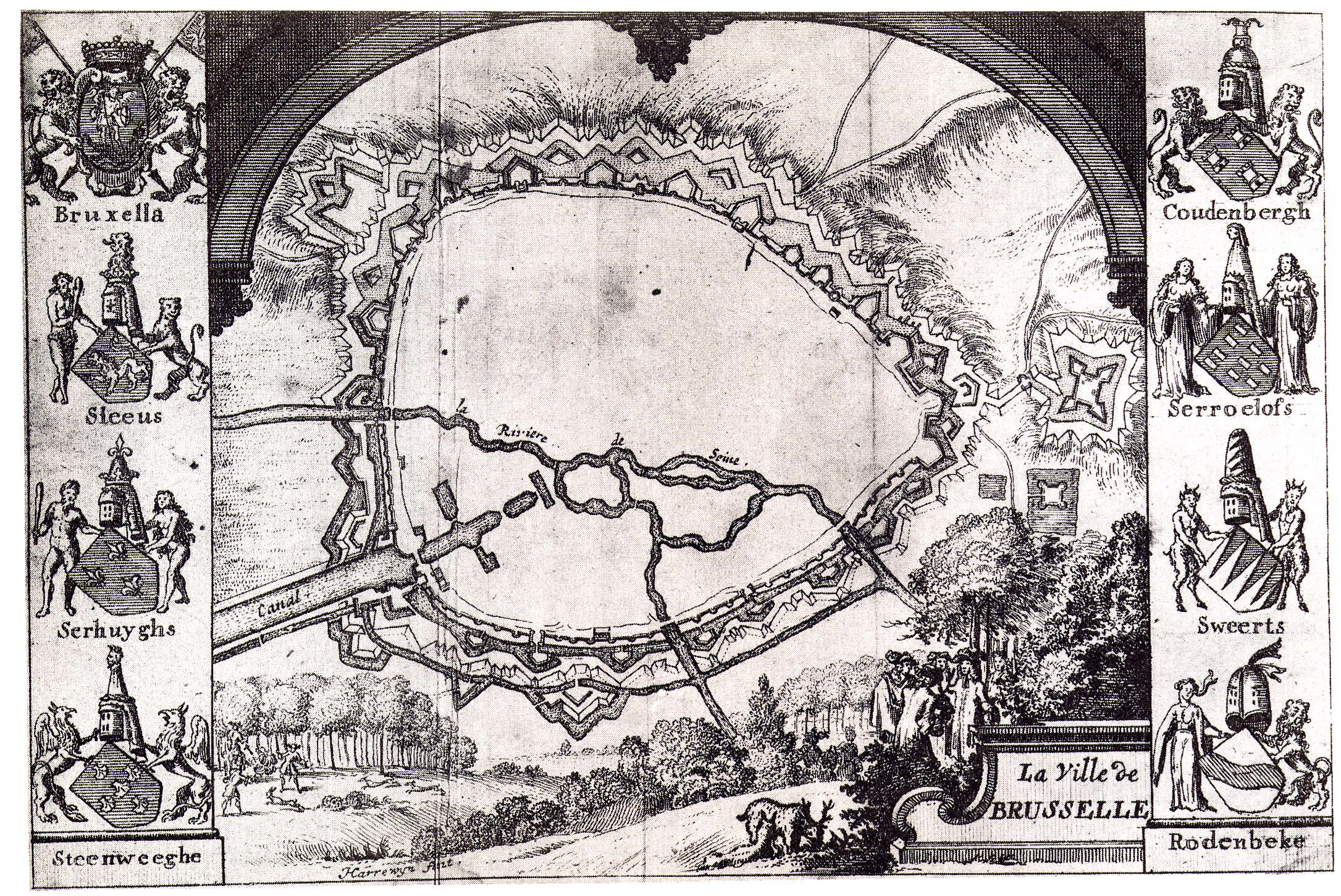
Coats of arms of the Seven noble houses of Brussels, engraved by Jacques Harrewyn, 1697.

The seven families were first named in a document from 1306 in which John II, Duke of Brabant restores and asserts the existing privileges of the seven families after the citizens of Brussels had violently demanded participation in the city's government. The families named in the document are:

- Sleeus (/sløs/)
- Sweerts (/sweɪrtz/)
- Serhuyghs (/sɛʁɡœz/)
- Steenweeghs (/stenweɡz/)
- Coudenbergh (/kawdən̪bəʁɡ/)
- Serroelofs
- Roodenbeke (/ʁodən̪bɛk/)

All the members of the city council were exclusively recruited and elected from the families who could prove patrilinear or matrilinear descent from the original seven families. However, tradesmen formed the Nations of Brussels to counter this oligarchical system and in 1421, after violent confrontations, gained some political rights. The rule of the Seven Houses remained predominant until the end of the Ancien Régime, when these special privileges were definitively abolished, along with those of the Guilds. This meant the end of this aristocratic system of government.

=== Membership ===
Membership and descent of the seven families was carefully recorded in special registers. Applicants needed to provide genealogical evidence that they were descendants of one of the Seven Noble Houses. In addition they needed to be citizens of Brussels, adult, male, catholic, and not earn a living through a trade; instead they were expected to live off the interest of their wealth. Illegitimate children were excluded. Since these criteria were very stringent, few men were accepted to the ranks of this particular patriciate.

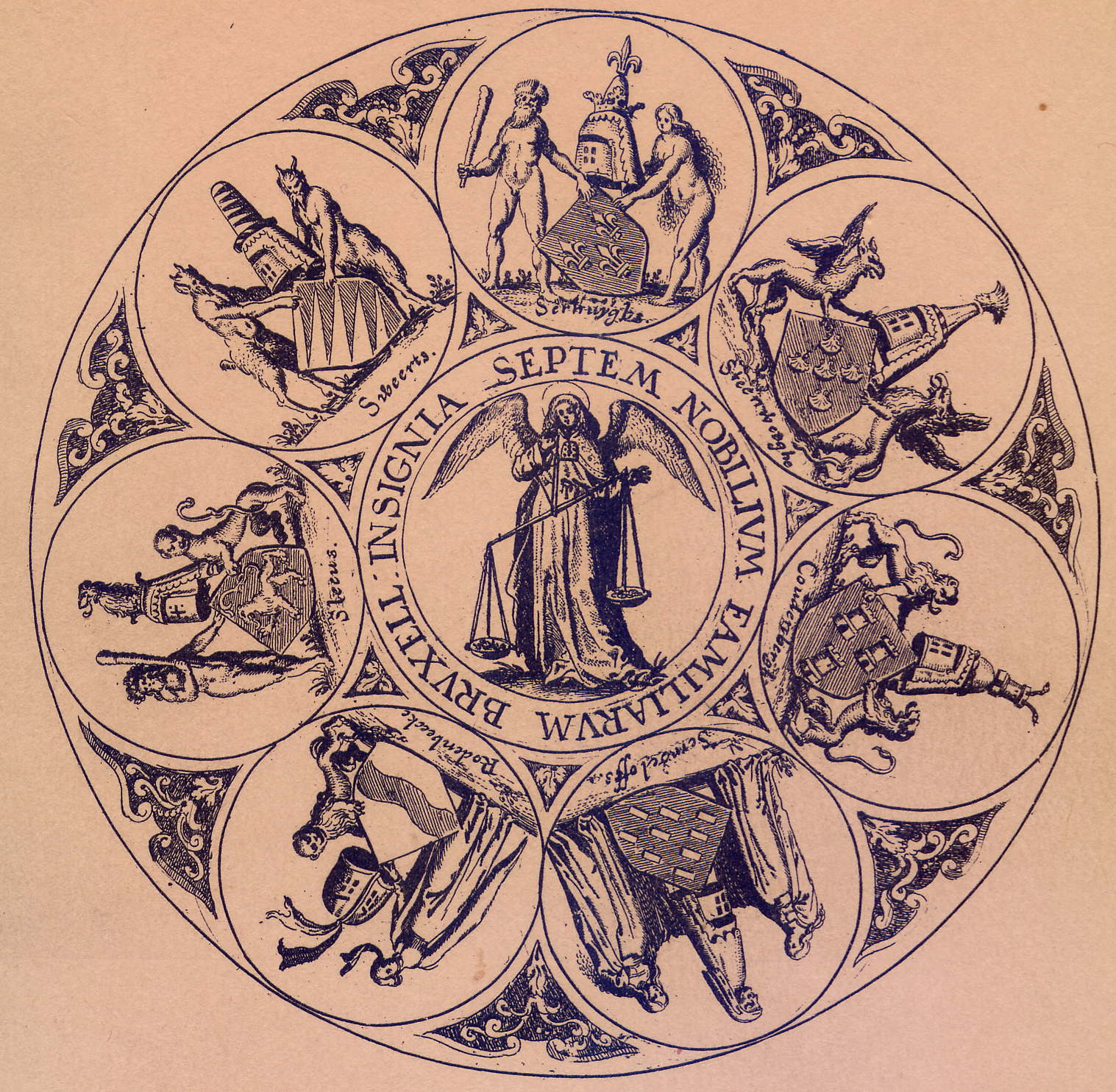
Rosette of the seven noble houses of Brussels, from Erycius Puteanus, Bruxella Septenaria, 1656.

=== Guardians of the gates and city walls ===
Members of the Seven Houses were responsible for defending the gates and city walls of Brussels. Starting in 1383, each House had the task of defending one of the seven gates of the Brussels wall along with a section of that wall. Houses could also use this gate (tower) to imprison members of their own House who had engaged in blameworthy conduct. In 1422, following the bloody events of 1421 that led to a new balance of power between the Brussels patriciate of the Seven Houses and representatives of the trades that then constituted the Guilds of Brussels (grouped in nine fraternities called "Nations"), this defence of the gates and walls was shared:

- The Cologne Gate was defended by the House of Coudenbergh, from 1422 together with the Nation of Saint-Géry.
- The Anderlecht Gate was defended by the House of t'Serroelofs, from 1422 together with the Nation of Saint-Christophe.
- The Laeken Gate was defended by the House of Sleeus, from 1422 together with the Nation of Notre-Dame.
- The Leuven Gate was defended by the House of Steenweghe, from 1422 together with the Nation of Saint-Jean.
- The Halle Gate was defended by the House of Serhuyghs, from 1422 together with the Nation of Saint-Laurent.
- The Flanders Gate was defended by the House of Sweerts, from 1422 together with the Nation of Saint-Gilles.
- The Namur Gate was defended by the House of Rodenbeke, from 1422 together with the Nation of Saint-Jacques.

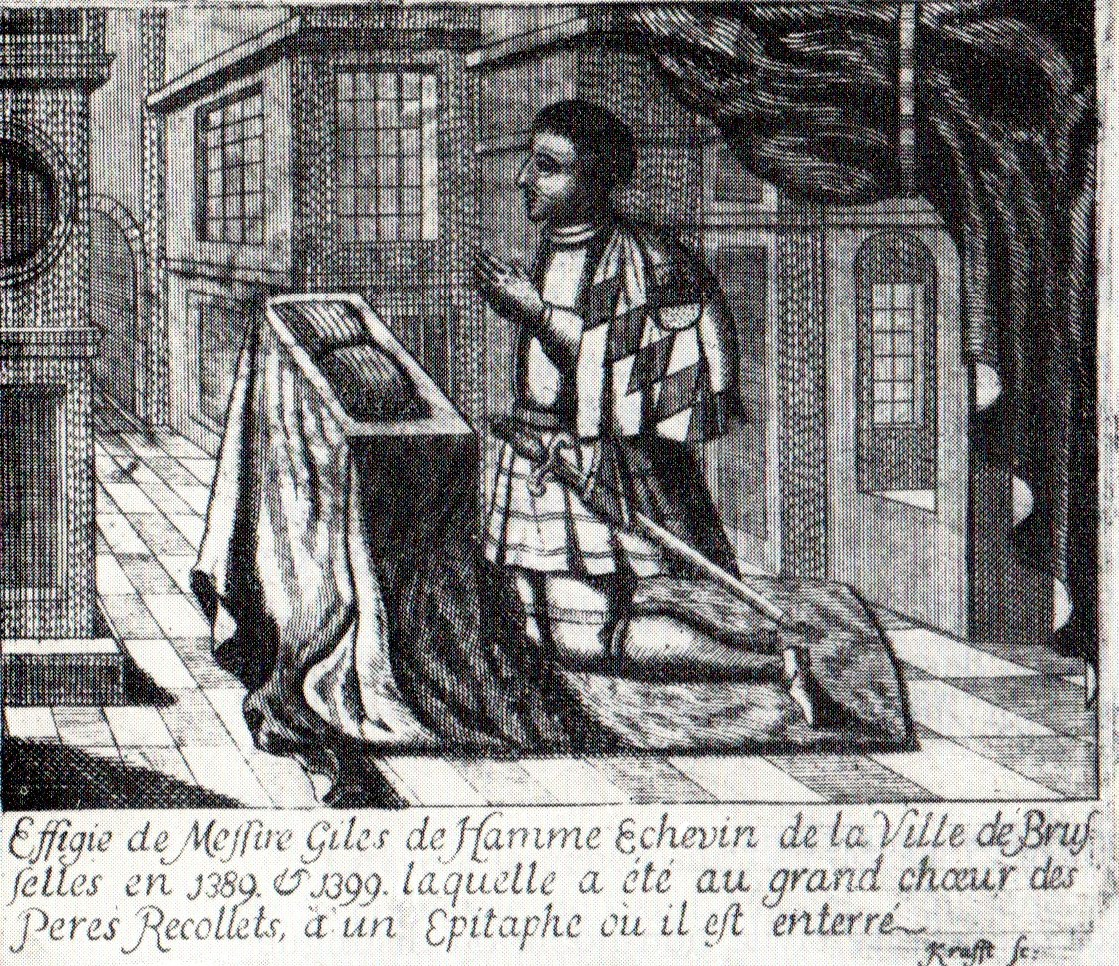
Gilles van Hamme, alderman of Brussels in 1389 and 1399, admitted to the House of Roodenbeke

=== Charitable activities ===
In addition to their judicial, administrative and military functions, the Seven Noble Houses of Brussels were also benevolent and concerned about the needs and well-being of the population.

Thus, the urban administration created an administrative relief service for the indigent, called the "Supreme Charity", whose masters-general were chosen only among the members of the Houses at the end of their offices in the urban magistracy.

Between the 12th and 18th centuries, the magistrates of the Noble Houses of the city of Brussels founded numerous official institutions, including schools, orphanages, pilgrim hostels, infirmaries and almshouses.

Alongside this, members of the Houses have also had, over the centuries, in their personal capacity, important private charitable activities and created many foundations and hospitals to relieve the misery of the population or members of the Houses that had fallen into poverty. These private foundations continued to exist until the end of the Ancien Régime and were after the French Revolution grouped in the Hospices Réunis, that still exist today.

Among these charitable foundations founded in a personal capacity by members of the Seven Houses, we can mention:

- 1128: Hospice of Saint-Nicholas, mentioned as early as 1128, next to the church of the same name.
- 1263: Hospice of Ter Arken, Rue Salazar 17, founded before 1263 by a member of the Clutinc family.
- 1356: Hospice of the Holy Trinity, founded before 1356 by the famous mystic Heilwige Bloemart called Bloemardine.
- 1388: Foundation of Saint Elizabeth of Hungary, or Landuyt Foundation, founded in 1388 by the bishop Jean t'Serclaes.
- 1522: Hospice of the Holy Cross, Rue Haute, founded in 1522 by Charles t'Seraerts.
- 1622: Hospice of t'Serclaes or of Saint-Anne, Rue de la Fiancée, founded in 1622 by Anne t'Serclaes.
- 1656-1658: Hospice of the Nine Choirs of Angels, Rue des Chevaux founded in 1656-1658 by Louise van der Noot.

=== The Seven Noble Houses and the Ommegang ===
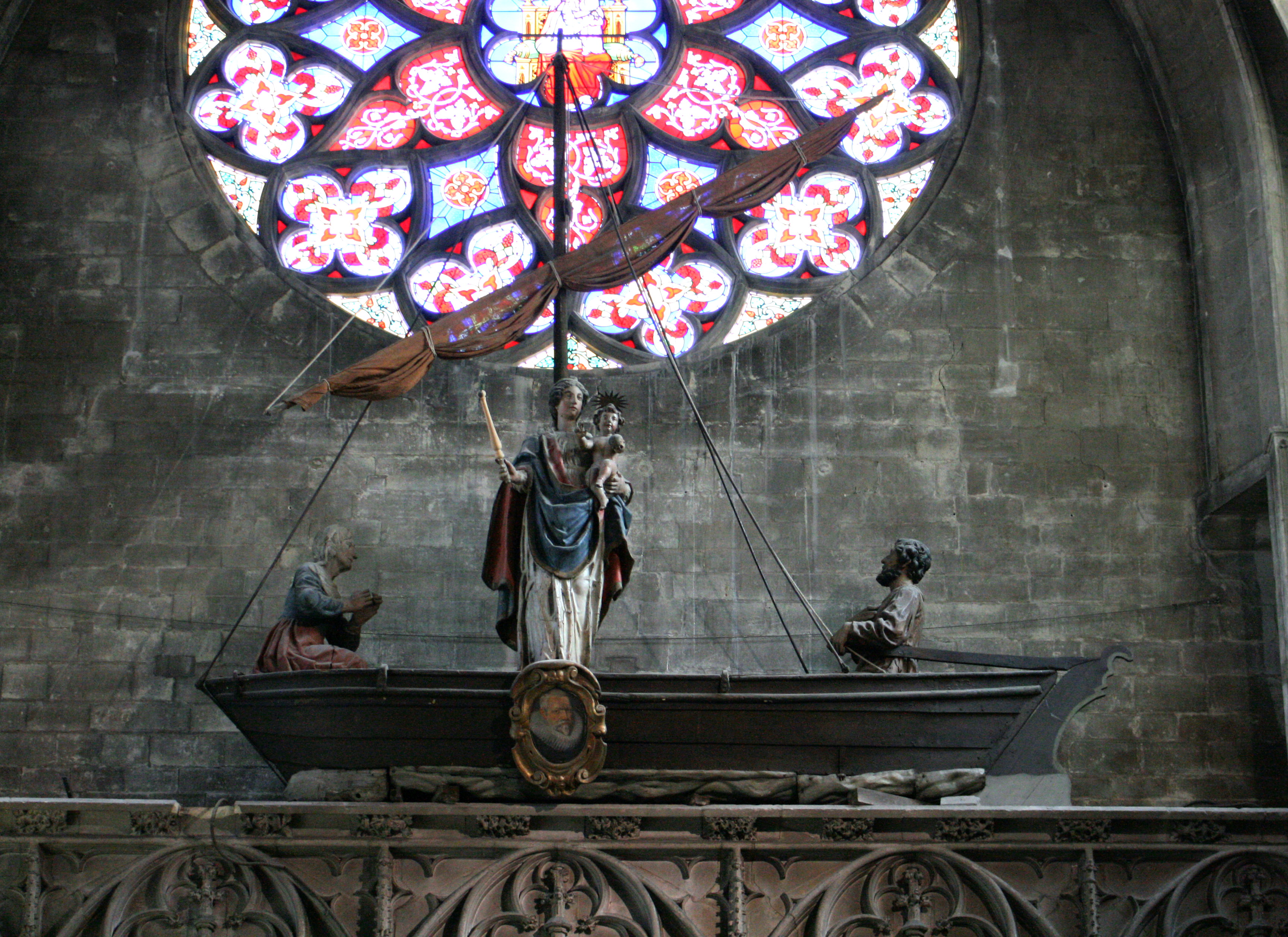
Our Blessed Lady of the Sablon, powerful protector of Brussels, standing on her boat. It is under her aegis and in her honour that every year the Ommegang takes place, in which the Seven Noble Houses still participate.

The annual Ommegang, Brussels' most important lustral procession, celebrated in honor of Our Blessed Lady of the Sablon, the powerful protector of the City of Brussels, is one of the most important moments of the history of the Seven Houses to this day.

The procession takes place on the Sunday before Pentecost, coinciding with the day of festival of the city of Brussels.

In this sacred procession, the magistrates and members of the Seven Noble Houses are dressed in red (the famous Brussels scarlet), stained in the blood of a bull. These are then preceded by the magistrates of the statue of the Virgin Mary.

=== Nobility of its members ===
Were members of the Seven Houses noble? As the historian, editor and genealogist François de Cacamp writes:

this question does not make much sense since there does not ever seem to have been a legal definition or status of nobility in Brabant, during the period of the national Dukes. Members of the Seven Houses were free men, descendants of free men, and it is more or less certain that in the 12th and even 13th centuries, the notions of freemen and noblemen were almost identical. During that time, being master and lord of land was being noble in a certain way, and this nobility of blood and land, of social rather than legal character, was transmitted to all children, male and female, by their mothers just as much as their fathers, the same way that land ownership, of which it was the corollary (...this is why) members of the Seven Houses, at least until the 16th century considered themselves, and were considered by others, as nobles, issued from "de nobilibus progeniebus ", "uit adellijke geslachten".

Historian and genealogist Christophe Butkens similarly wrote around 1600 that "In this city of Brussels there is an officer of the Duke called Amman and seven aldermen, which have always been elected from the seven patrician families - noble and privileged – in a way that nobody is elected as alderman or magistrate if he is not a descendent, either way, of any of those families."

Louis Hymans, historian of Brussels, also notes that this nobility was transmissible in the female line. Adages, told by historians, testify that: "the women, in the lineages, ennobled their husbands: Feminœ quia nobiles, etiam maritos nuptiis nobiles reddunt. They brought nobility in dowry: In dotem familiam ac nobilitatem afferunt."

Nicolas Joseph Stevens concluded that: "even though under the Austrian regime, which in terms of prerogatives devolving to the nobility, we know the essentially formalistic spirit, the quality of Noble was denied to members of the Seven Houses, init is not any less true that they had, by the seniority of their existence and by their services rendered to the City, rights to a certain illustrious standing, which distinguished them from the rest of the bourgeoisie".

Moreover, even in the Austrian period, in 1743, the description of the city of Brussels published by George Frix reads: "These Noble families called Patrician are those of Steenweghe, Sleews, Serhuyghs, Coudenbergh, Serroelofs, Swerts and of Rodenbeeck; whose descendants subsist still encore without having derogated from either the nobility or the virtues of their ancestors. Numerous rulers of Brabant among which I will cite John II and Charles I, recognised them as illustrious and wise in authentic charters of 1360 and 1469 where they gave titles of Chevaliers (Knights), Ecuiers (squires) and of d'Amis aux Sujets de leur tems (Friends to the Subjects of their tems) issued from these Noble families" and he continues "The privilege particular to these Noble families is worthy of remark. The women carry the name and the rights of their Houses into those they enter through marriage, being Nobles, they ennoble their husbands; and as daughters of patricians, they give the rank, the quality and all the rights to those they choose as husbands; in a way that, Patrician families, being very multiplied, gave a high number of subjects to the magistrature". Another half a century later, Aubin-Louis Millin de Grandmaison estimates that: "These families benefited from wide ranging privileges. The most beautiful of all gave women the faculty to pull out of the shadows the families to which they allied themselves. As nobles, they ennobled their husbands, and as daughters of patricians, they gave them rank, quality and all the rights."

Thus, members of the Seven Houses were originally Nobles and recognised as such undeniably by the inhabitants of the City of Brussels and beyond. But, as Alfred De Ridder writes in 1896 the fact that for members of the Lineages, the women conferred nobility to their husbands and, according to the old saying, "the womb ennobles", damaged the nobiliary principles of the Austrian Netherlands. However, this belief that nobility was only transmitted by men in this region is a grave historical error, as many authors have since shown. Empress Maria Theresa, in Article XIV of her edict of 11 December 1754 "regarding titles and marks of honour or nobility, bearing of arms, coats of arms and other distinctions" tried to give, by law, a definitive solution to this question: it was then forbidden to the Members to give to themselves and their wives titles and marks of nobility: "XIV Those admitted to patrician families or lineages of our cities, will not be allowed to carry swords, or to give themselves or their wives titles or marks of nobility, failure to respect this will result in a fine of 200 florins". Thus, following the entry into force of this edict in the southern Netherlands, the Lineages of Brussels were no longer able, legally, to take advantage of external marks of nobility, although the nobility was not formally denied to them by this edict. On this point, the state of the question remained unchanged in the legal order of the southern Netherlands, for the next forty years, until the abolition of all nobility and the lineage regime of Brussels by the French Revolutionary Power during the invasion of Belgian Provinces. Under the First Empire, Napoleon I gradually recreated from 1804 a new nobility, somewhat similar, all to his devotion and supposed to be a faithful supporter of his regime. The Brussels Houses had no place. Under the United Kingdom of the Netherlands, from 1815 to 1830, with a constitution that gave extensive powers to William I, members of the nobility of each province were united in the provincial equestrian bodies to which were attributed political powers. This is why, following a decree of 26 January 1822 forcing the former nobility to be recognised, only the nobles who were willing to collaborate and to support the policies of King William were recognised. But none of the numerous decrees of King William suggests that all the ancient nobility, even if not recognized by King William, would have been annihilated. Finally, the Belgian Constitution of 1831 made a clean sweep of the Loi Fondamentale of 1815 and therefore also of this decree of 1822. The Belgian National Congress intended to maintain the old nobility and by Article 75 of the Constitution, allowed the King of the Belgians to create new nobles for the future. Nothing distinct was resolved by the National Congress for the Seven Noble Houses of Brussels.

As can be seen by looking at the List and Arms of the persons admitted to the Lineages of Brussels, if many Brussels Lignagers were, during the Old Regime, legally noble to have been ennobled by the Prince or to descend from the family of which the nobility was legally recognized, the fact remains that all the members of the Noble Houses of Brussels and their descendants enjoyed, at the time, a sui generis legal status conferring on them, in Brussels, in law, important privileges, and indeed, a very high prestige that has continued to this day.

== Heraldry of the Seven Houses ==
The arms of the City of Brussels were Plain Gules. Many of the members and families descending from the Seven Houses carry a variant of these arms.

Concerning representation of the Houses' arms in the following list, the choice was made to use the ones most often admitted. In reality, a personal armorial would be needed as, very often, members of the Houses modified and personalised their arms up to the 18th century, either by adding charges or by changing tinctures, etc. This practice was necessary because of the very nature of this system; there were numerous members of the magistrate who were member of the same house and even had the same family name, thus it was necessary to differentiate arms so as not to confuse them with other members of the family. The study of aldermen seals shows the high number of patrician arms.

=== Arms of the Seven Houses ===
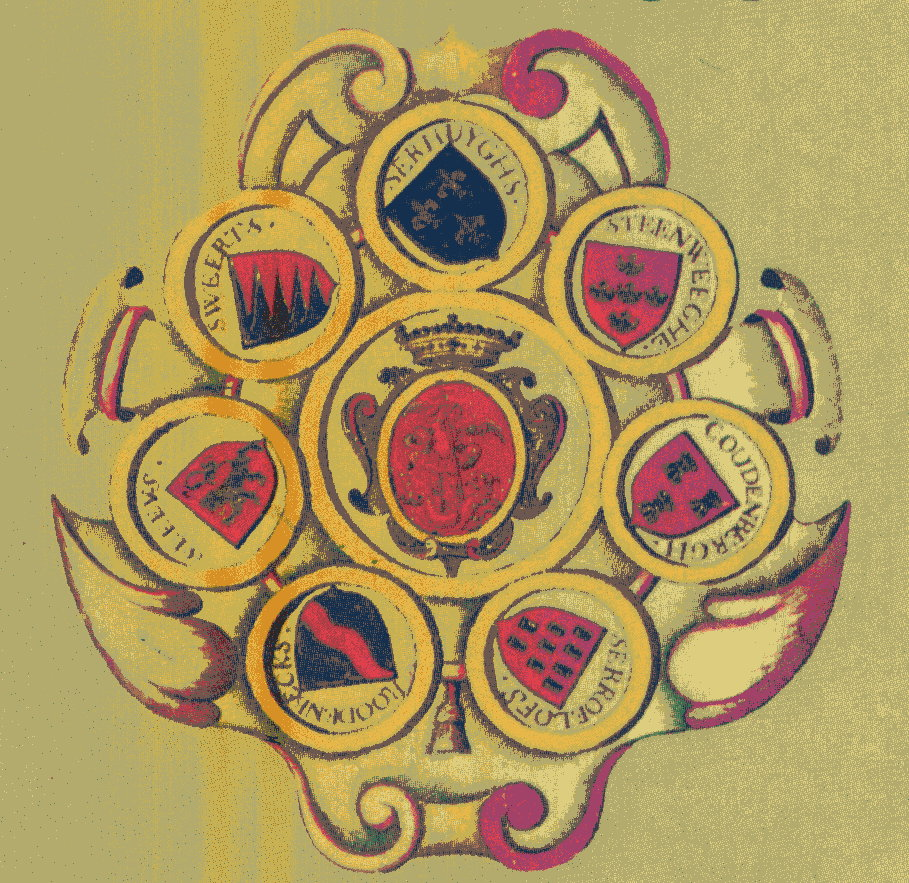
Arms of the Seven Houses, in an 18th Century manuscript.

- Sleeus : Gules that is Brussels, a lion rampant argent.
- Coudenbergh : Gules that is Brussels, three towers argent windows gules and gated azure.
- Steenweeghs : Gules that is Brussels, five escallops in a cross.
- Serroelofs : Gules that is Brussels, nine billets argent, positioned 4, 3 and 2.
- Roodenbeke : Argent, a bend wavy gules.
- Sweerts : Party per pale pily of four and a half argent on gules.
- Serhuyghs : azure, three fleurs-de-lis couped argent.

== Present day ==
Today, an organization has been formed to bring descendants of the Seven Houses together. This organization plans certain traditional events such as the Ommegang ceremony.

Descendants of the Seven Houses do not enjoy special political privileges any longer.

Descendants of the seven nobles house of Brussels are entitled to place the post-nominal initials PB (for the Latin Patricius Bruxellensis) or - in case they hold a title of nobility - NPB (Nobilis Patricius Bruxellensis) after their name. This custom is already found in the writings of Jan-Baptist Hauwaert, NPB (1533–1599).

== Families whose members were admitted to the Seven Noble Houses of Brussels in the Ancien Régime ==
- van Cotthem
- Pipenpoy
- T'Kint de Roodenbeke
- de Lalaing
- Leyniers
- Poot
- van der Noot
- Orts

== Bibliography ==
- Joseph de Roovere, NPB, Le manuscrit de Roovere conservé au Fonds Général du Cabinet des Manuscrits de la Bibliothèque Royale de Belgique. Filiations reconnues sous l'Ancien Régime pour l'admission aux Lignages de Bruxelles, ed. M. Paternostre de La Mairieu, avec une introduction d'Henri-Charles van Parys, Grandmetz, 2 vol., 1981-1982 (Tablettes du Brabant, Recueils X et XI).
- N. J. Stevens, Recueil généalogique de la famille de Cock, Brussels, 1855.
- Viscount Terlinden, "Coup d'oeil sur l'histoire des lignages de Bruxelles", in Présence du passé, vol. 2, 1949.
- Baudouin Walckiers, PB, Filiations lignagères contemporaines, Brussels, 1999.

== See also ==
- Drapery Court of Brussels
- Guilds of Brussels
- Bourgeois of Brussels
- Belgian nobility
- Tribes of Galway
- Bourgeois of Paris
- Bourgeoisie of Geneva
- Freedom of the City of London
- Grand Burgher
- Great Council of Venice
- Boston Brahmin
- Old Philadelphians
- First Families of Virginia
- Colonial families of Maryland
- American gentry
- Dominant minority
