= Bourgeois of Brussels =

Patrician class of the city

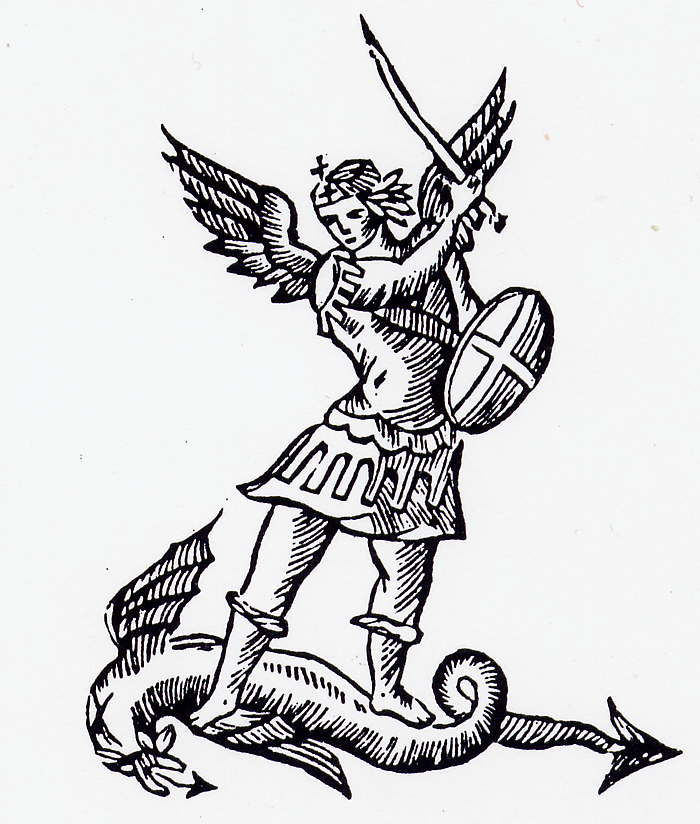
Saint Michael, secular emblem of Brussels

In Brussels, as in most European cities, one needed the capacity of bourgeois (equivalent to German burgher or English burgess; in French bourgeois or citoyen de Bruxelles; in Dutch poorter or borger van Brussel; in Latin civis or oppidanus Bruxellensis) to exercise political rights but also to practice a trade, which in Brussels meant to be a member of the guilds or of the Seven Noble Houses.

The charter of Brussels, as codified in 1570 in Articles 206 and following, provided the conditions of admission to the bourgeoisie of the city. The Bourgeois were the patrician class of the city. This social class was abolished by Napoleon during the French occupation.

== Capacity of bourgeois ==
The non-bourgeois inhabitants, called "inhabitants" in French and "ingesetene" in Dutch, have none of these political rights, but are not less protected by communal laws, and can appeal to urban justice, as well as buy property. The capacity of Bourgeois, which implied an oath, was seen as a pledge of loyalty to the city and the urban community.

In Brussels, the bourgeois were sometimes called "poorters" name often given to citizens of important cities called walled cities. This word derives from the Dutch word fallen into disuse poorte, city or place closed by walls, like the imposing stone houses that the rich bourgeois of the Seven Noble Houses lived in during the early days of the city, and to which was also given the name of "poorte" or "porta" in Latin, and whose synonym was "herberg" or "hostel" and which are also called steen. Each of these "poorte" had a name, for example: "Poorte van den Galoyse", "Poorte van Coeckelberg", "Gouden Poorte", "Priemspooerte", the "Raempoorte" (in Overmolen), "porta t 'Serclaes' known as 'the Palace', 'Slozenpoorte' (on the Sablon), 'Poorte van de Tafelronde' or 'Poorte van Vianen'.

The European Medieval practice of naming houses was rich and varied in Brussels.

The capacity of bourgeois, that is to say of citizen of a city having political rights in opposition to the simple inhabitants, forms the base of the urban organisation of cities. This urban system in Europe dates back for many cities still existing today to Greco-Latin antiquity, others were founded around the year one thousand. This system of urban civilization developed in parallel to the rural civilization rooted in the Neolithic era.

== Abolition by Napoléon ==
Under Napoleon, the Law abolished for good, in the territories that were submitted to France, the differences of status between cities and countryside and abolished the quality of bourgeois or citizen of a city. In other parts of Europe, as it is now in Switzerland (Swiss bourgeoisie), this system has endured. In Germany, it was slowly abolished, and only Hamburg and Bremen retain the Hanseatic designation freie Stadt from their days as free imperial cities.

== Subsisting bourgeois families of Brussels ==
The following is a chronological list of surviving Brussels bourgeois families with the date of admission and of which of the Seven Noble Houses (Lignages in French) they currently descend from, if any. Namely, the houses of Sweerts, Sleeus, Steenweeghs, Roodenbeke, Serroelofs, Coudenbergh, and Serhuyghs.

=== Middle Ages ===
- 1150, approximately, van der Noot Family, (Houses of Sweerts, Steenweeghs and Roodenbeke)

=== 15th century ===
- 1447, approximately, Leyniers family (Houses of Coudenbergh, Sweerts and Sleeus).
- 1452, approximately, d'Arschot family, then van Schoonhoven, then d'Arschot-Schoonhoven (House of t'Serroelofs)
- 1458, 11 January, van Droogenbroeck family (House of Sweerts)
- 1458, 9 August, van Cotthem family (House of Sweerts)
- 1460, approximately, Meeûs family, (Houses of Sweerts and Sleeus)
- 1461, approximately, Devadder ou de Vaddere family.
- 1487, 9 July, Aelbrechts said de Borsere family (House of Roodenbeke)
- 1488, 9 May, van Droogenbroeck family (House of Roodenbeke)
- 1489, approximately, t'Kint, then t'Kint de Roodenbeke family (House of Roodenbeke)
- 1490, Van der Meulen family
- 1490, approximately, Jambers family
- 1490, 4 December Ranspoet family (House of Roodenbeke):
- 1492, 27 June, O(l)brechts dit de Vos family (House ofRoodenbeke):
- 1498, 6 April Moyensoen family (House of Roodenbeke):

=== 16th century ===
- 1501, approximately, de Lens family (Also bourgeois of Paris, established there under Louis XIV as goldsmith of Philippe I, Duke of Orléans.).
- 1543, van Volxem family (House of Serhuyghs) (established in Trier in Germany at the end of the XVIII Century)
- 1590, approximately Damiens family(House of Sweerts).
- 1590, approximately, de Walsche family (House of Coudenberg).
- 1591, approximately, Robyns, then Robyns de Schneidauer family (House of Sleeus).
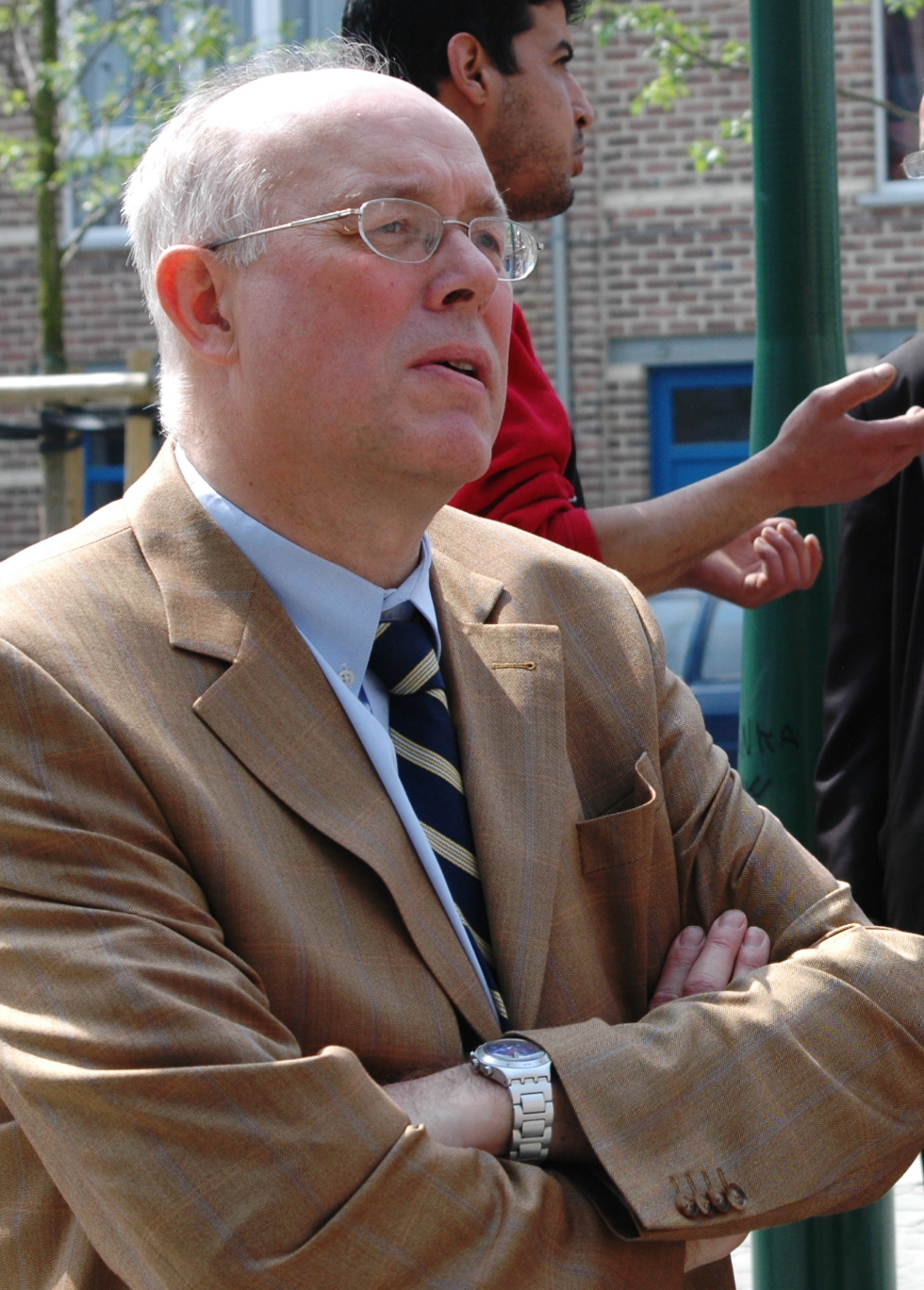
  Charles Picqué, a Belgian politician and former Minister-President of the Brussels Capital-Region, is a member of a Bourgeois family of the city.

=== 17th century ===
- 1601, approximately, van der Borcht family (Houses of Sweerts and Sleeus).
- 1608-1609, van Berchem family.
- 1611-1612, Roberti family.
- 1617-1618, van Dievoet family (Houses of Sweerts, Sleeus, Serhuyghs, t'Serroelofs, Coudenbergh, Roodenbeke and Steenweeghs) (also bourgeois of Paris until 1802, where the family was called Vandive).
- 1619-1620, van der Belen family (House of Sweerts).
- 1623-1624, Maskens family (House of Serhuygs).
- 1626-1627, de Viron family (House of Sweerts).
- 1633-1634, Dansaert family.
- 1637 and 1655, Blondeau family.
- 1649, 3 July, Orts family (House of Sweerts).
- 1655, 12 January, Blondeau.
- 1668, de Burbure family.
- 1683, 20 January, Deudon family.
- 1696, 22 March, Poot family or Poot-Baudier family (House of Sweerts).
- 1698, approximately, Heyvaert family.

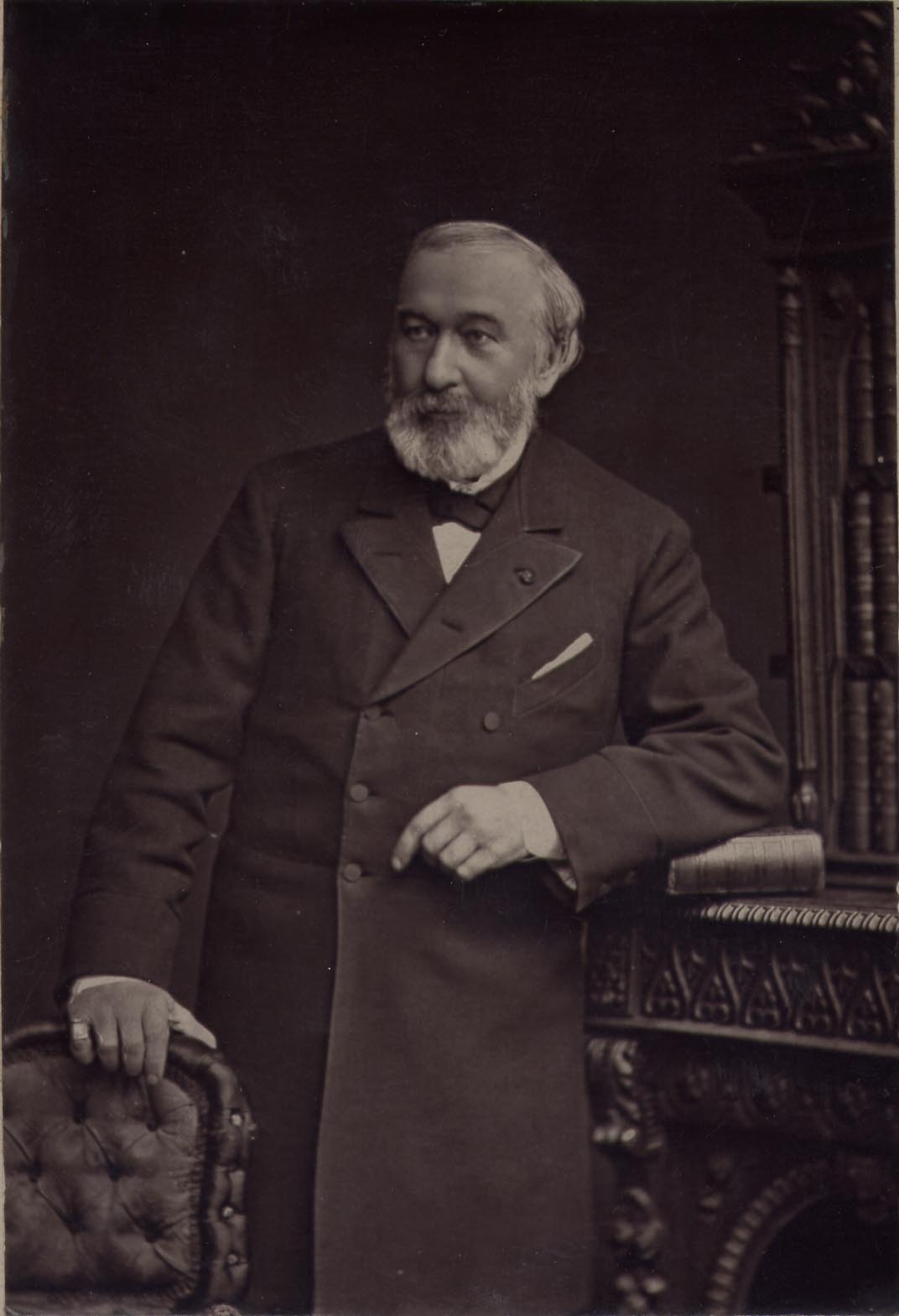
Joseph Poelaert (1817–1879), a Belgian architect who designed the Law Courts of Brussels, is a member of a Bourgeois family of the city.

=== 18th century ===
- 1707, 12 October, Drugman family.
- 1711, 7 January, de Meurs family.
- 1712, 14 June, Demeure family.
- 1711, 3 June, Brinck family (the family moved to Canada) (House of Serhuyghs).
- 1729, 29 January, Fanuel family (currently House of Sweerts).
- 1733, 22 September, Cattoir family.
- 1741, 21 June, de Reus family (House of Serhuyghs).
- 1745, 10 February, Picqué family.
- 1752, 24 February, Triest family (House of Sleeus).
- 1752, 29 May, and 1755, 18 February, Allard family.
- 1753, 10 March, Stinglhamber family (of Bavarian origins).
- 1764, 16 June, van Cutsem family.
- 1766, 19 September, Walckiers family (House of Coudenbergh).
- 1767, 3 August, Marousé family.
- 1768, 17 June, Hap family (House of Serhuyghs).
- 1769, 14 July, Lequime family.
- 1776, 8 February, Héger family.
- 1782, 8 April, Poelaert family.
- 1783, 12 February, de Voghel family (House of Serhuyghs).
- 1785, 14 January, van Hoegaerden family.
- 1786, 11 December, van Hoorde family.
- 1794, 27 May, Wittouck family.
- 1794, 10 September, D'Ieteren family.
- 1794, 16 December, Pitseys (Putseys) family.
- 1795, 7 January, Becquet family.
- 1795, 29 January, Janlet family.
- 1795, 9 March, Van Nuffel family.
- 1795, 20 May, Wielemans family (House of Coudenbergh).

== See also ==
- Seven Noble Houses of Brussels
- Guilds of Brussels
- Court of Drapery of Brussels
- List of mayors of the City of Brussels
- Pipenpoy family
- Van der Meulen family
- Bourgeois of Paris
- Bourgeoisie of Geneva
- Bourgeoisie
- Patrician
- Grand Burghers
- Burgess
- Hanseaten
- Gentry
- Boston Brahmin
- Old Philadelphians
- Daig
- American Gentry
- Dominant Minority
- Socialite
