= House of Roodenbeke =

Roodenbeke
- Place of origin: Brussels

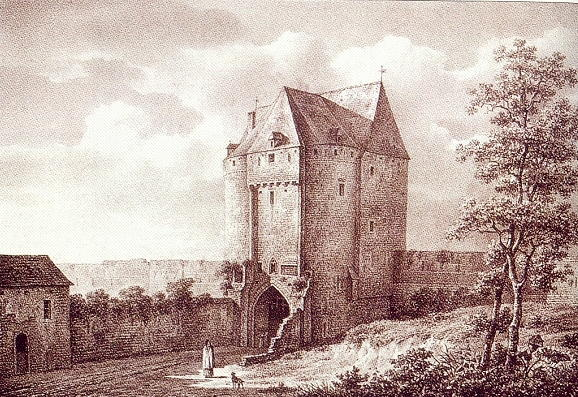
The Namur Gate, c. 1780

The House of Roodenbeke or Roodenbeke Lineage (French: Lignage Roodenbeke) is one of the Seven Noble Houses of Brussels, along with Sleeus, Serhuyghs, Steenweeghs, Sweerts, Serroelofs, and Coudenberg.

The Coudenberg House was charged with the defence of the Namur Gate, and was assisted as of 1422 by the Nation of St James.

== Escutcheon ==
Argent, a bend wavy gules.

== The Seven Noble Houses of Brussels ==
The Seven Noble Houses of Brussels (French: Sept lignages de Bruxelles, Dutch: Zeven geslachten van Brussel) were the seven families of Brussels whose descendants formed the city's patrician class, to whom special privileges were granted until the end of the Ancien Régime. Together with the Guilds of Brussels, they formed the city's bourgeoisie.

== Notable people ==
| Name | Birth | Death | Admitted | Known for | Ref. |
|---|---|---|---|---|---|
| Joseph van den Leene | c. 1735 | 1804 | 1754 | Last president of the Great Council of Mechelen | |
| Frederick de Marselaer | 12 July 1586 | 7 November 1670 | 8 February 1613 | Mayor of Brussels | |

== See also ==
History of Brussels
