= House of Serroelofs =

Serroelofs
- Place of origin: Brussels

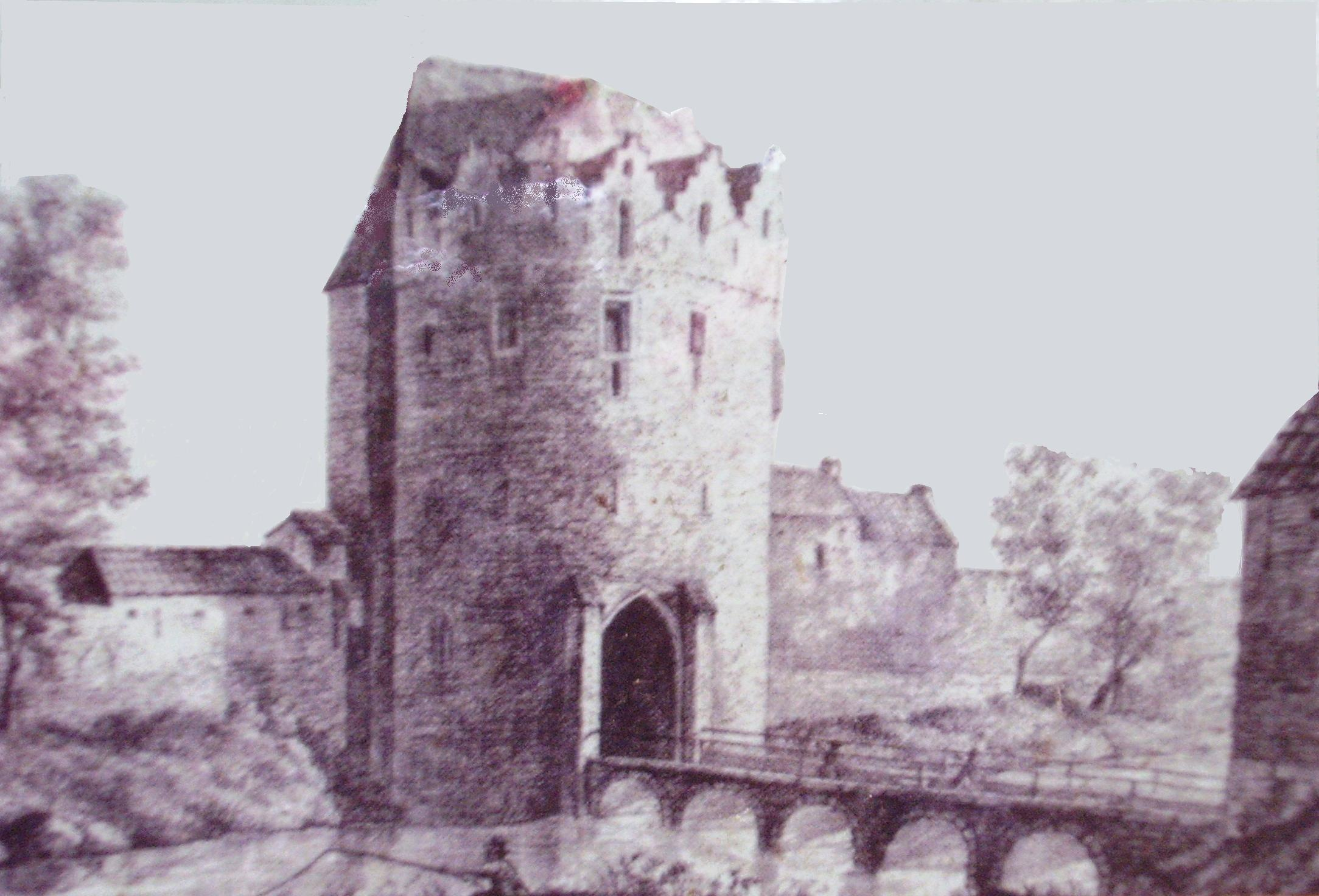
The Anderlecht Gate in 1612

The House or Lineage of Serroelofs or t'Serroelofs (French: Lignage Serroelofs) is one of the Seven Noble Houses of Brussels, along with Sleeus, Serhuyghs, Steenweeghs, Sweerts, Coudenberg, and Roodenbeke.

The Serroelofs House was charged with the defence of the Anderlecht Gate, and was assisted as of 1422 by the Nation of St Christopher.

== Escutcheon ==
Gules that is Brussels, nine billets argent, positioned 4, 3 and 2.

== The Seven Noble Houses of Brussels ==
The Seven Noble Houses of Brussels (French: Sept lignages de Bruxelles, Dutch: Zeven geslachten van Brussel) were the seven families of Brussels whose descendants formed the city's patrician class, to whom special privileges were granted until the end of the Ancien Régime. Together with the Guilds of Brussels, they formed the city's bourgeoisie.

== See also ==
History of Brussels
