= House of Sleeus =

Sleeus
- Place of origin: Brussels

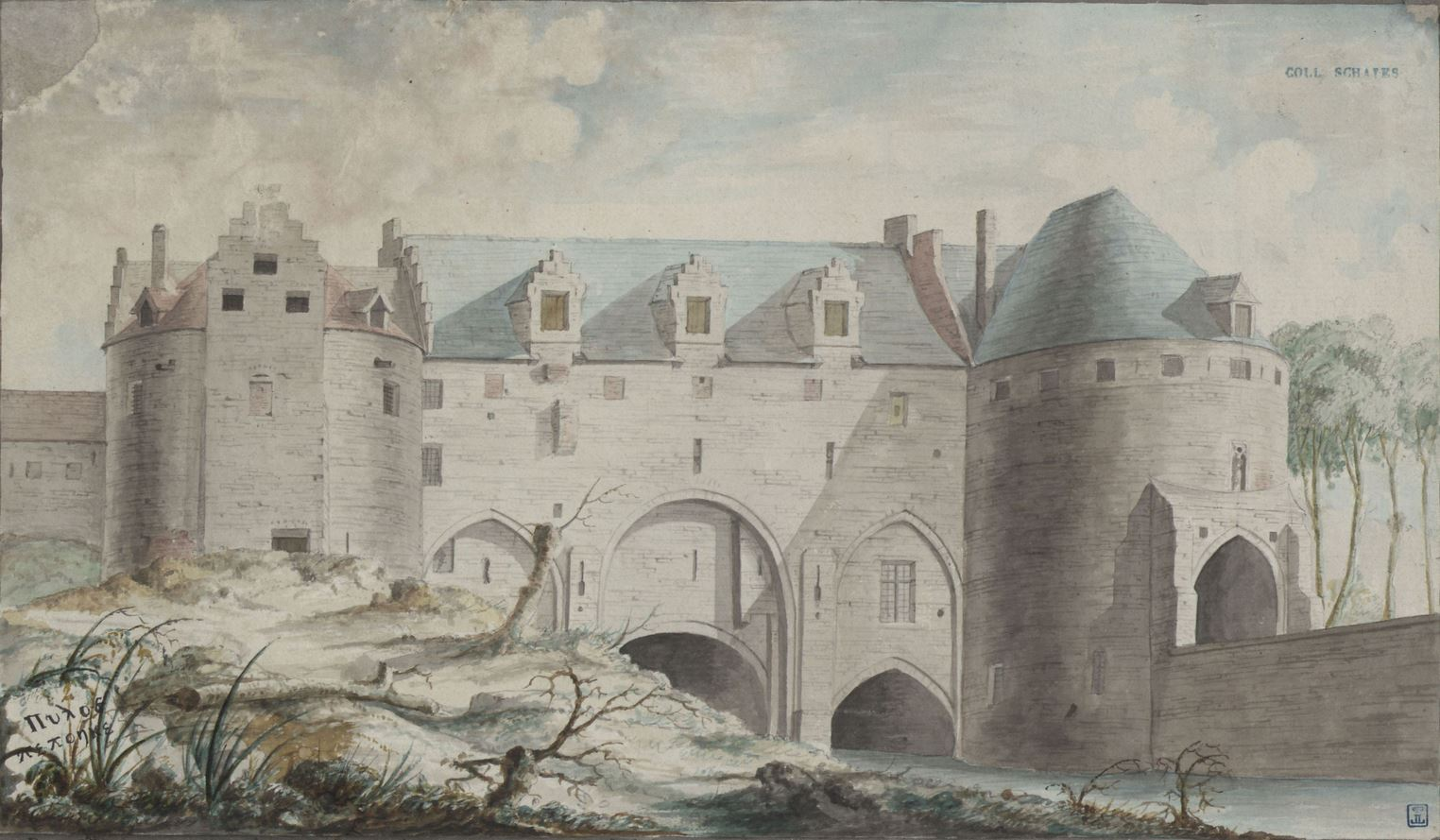
The Laeken Gate in 1786

The House of Sleeus or Sleeus Lineage (French: Lignage Sleeus) is one of the Seven Noble Houses of Brussels, along with Roodenbeke, Serhuyghs, Steenweeghs, Sweerts, Serroelofs, and Coudenberg.

The Sleeus House was charged with the defence of the Laeken Gate, and was assisted as of 1422 by the Nation of Our Lady.

== Escutcheon ==
Gules that is Brussels, a lion rampant argent.

== The Seven Noble Houses of Brussels ==
The Seven Noble Houses of Brussels (French: Sept lignages de Bruxelles, Dutch: Zeven geslachten van Brussel) were the seven families of Brussels whose descendants formed the city's patrician class, to whom special privileges were granted until the end of the Ancien Régime. Together with the Guilds of Brussels, they formed the city's bourgeoisie.

== Engraving ==
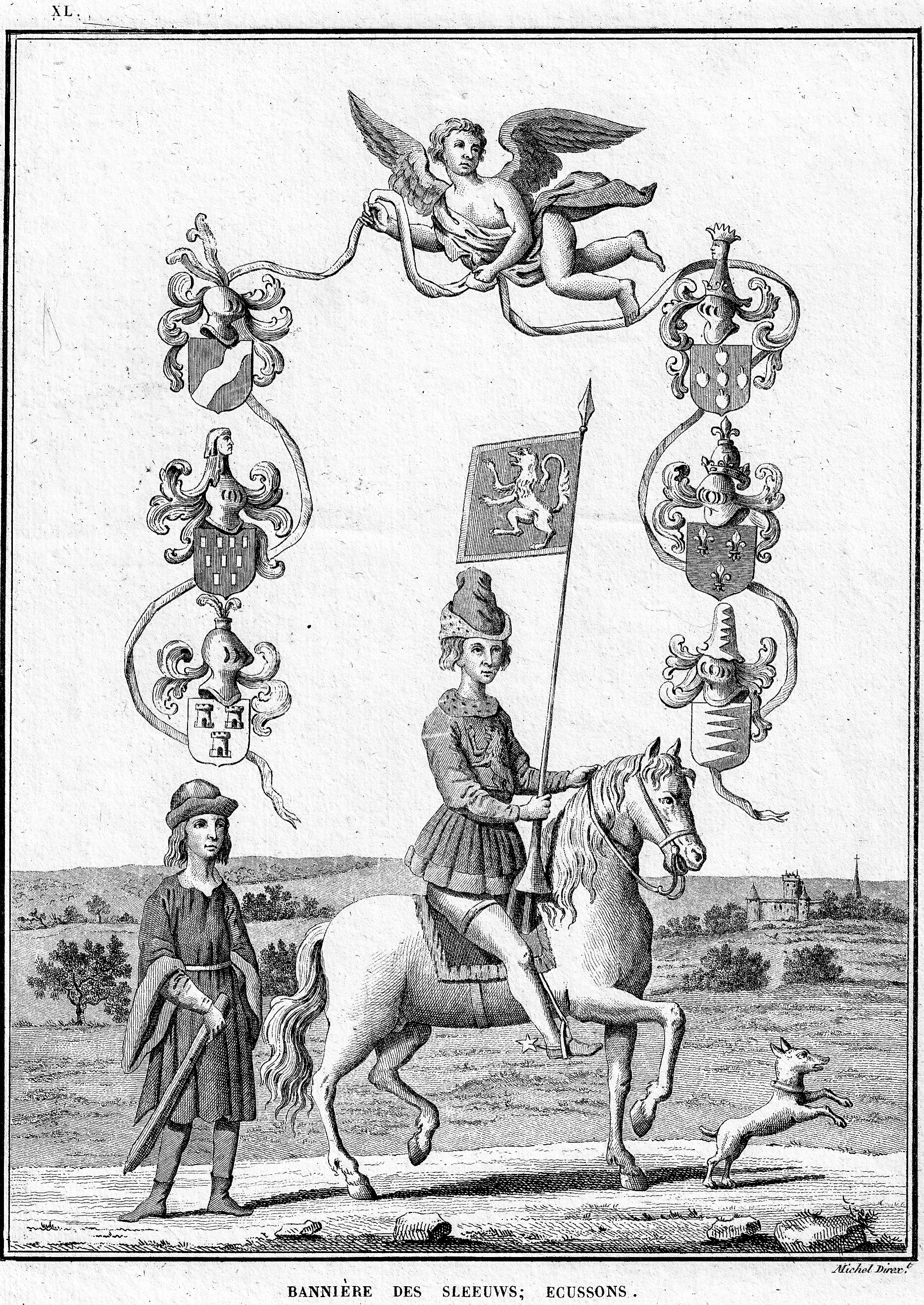

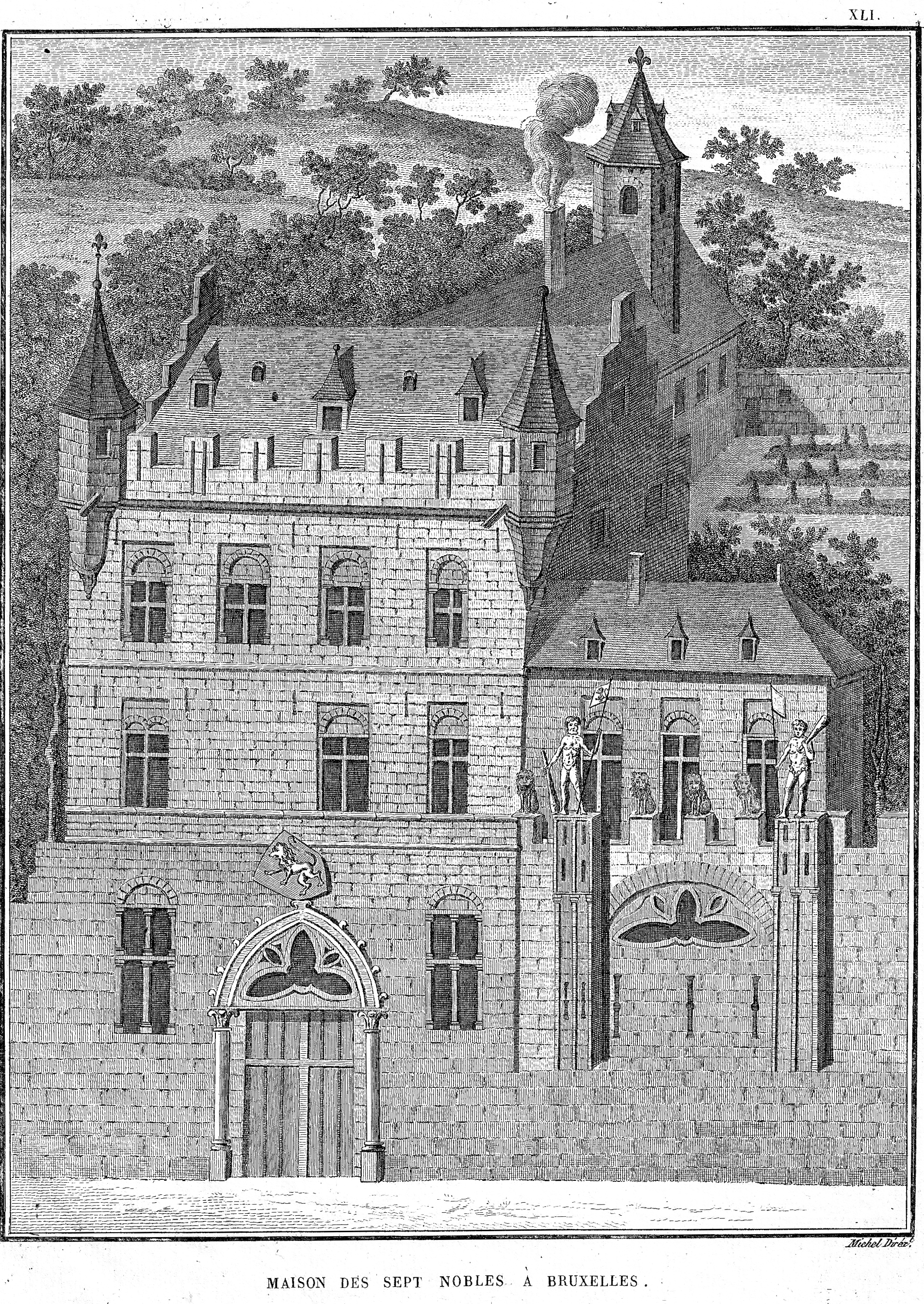

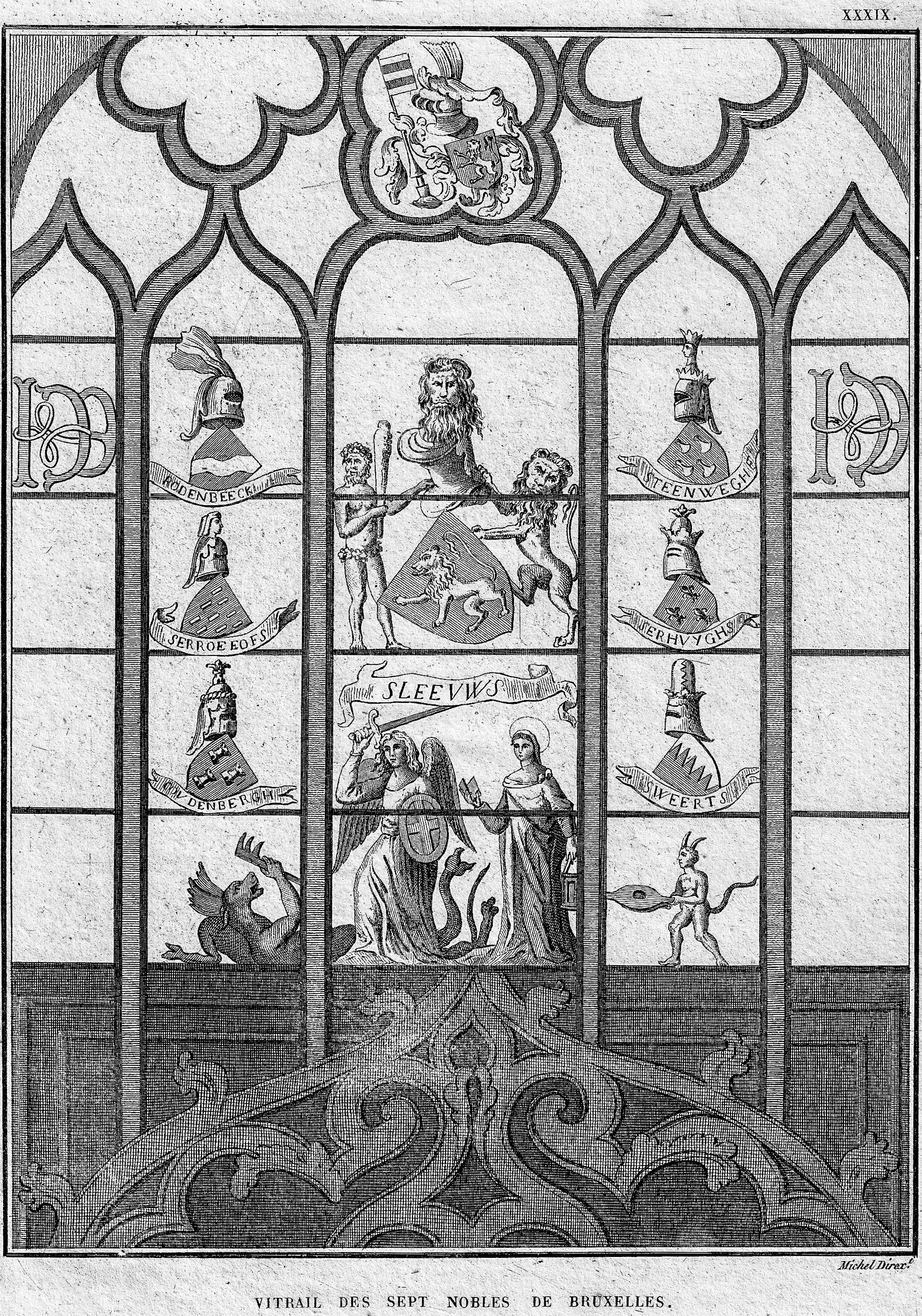

== See also ==
History of Brussels
