= House of Serhuyghs =

Serhuyghs
- Place of origin: Brussels

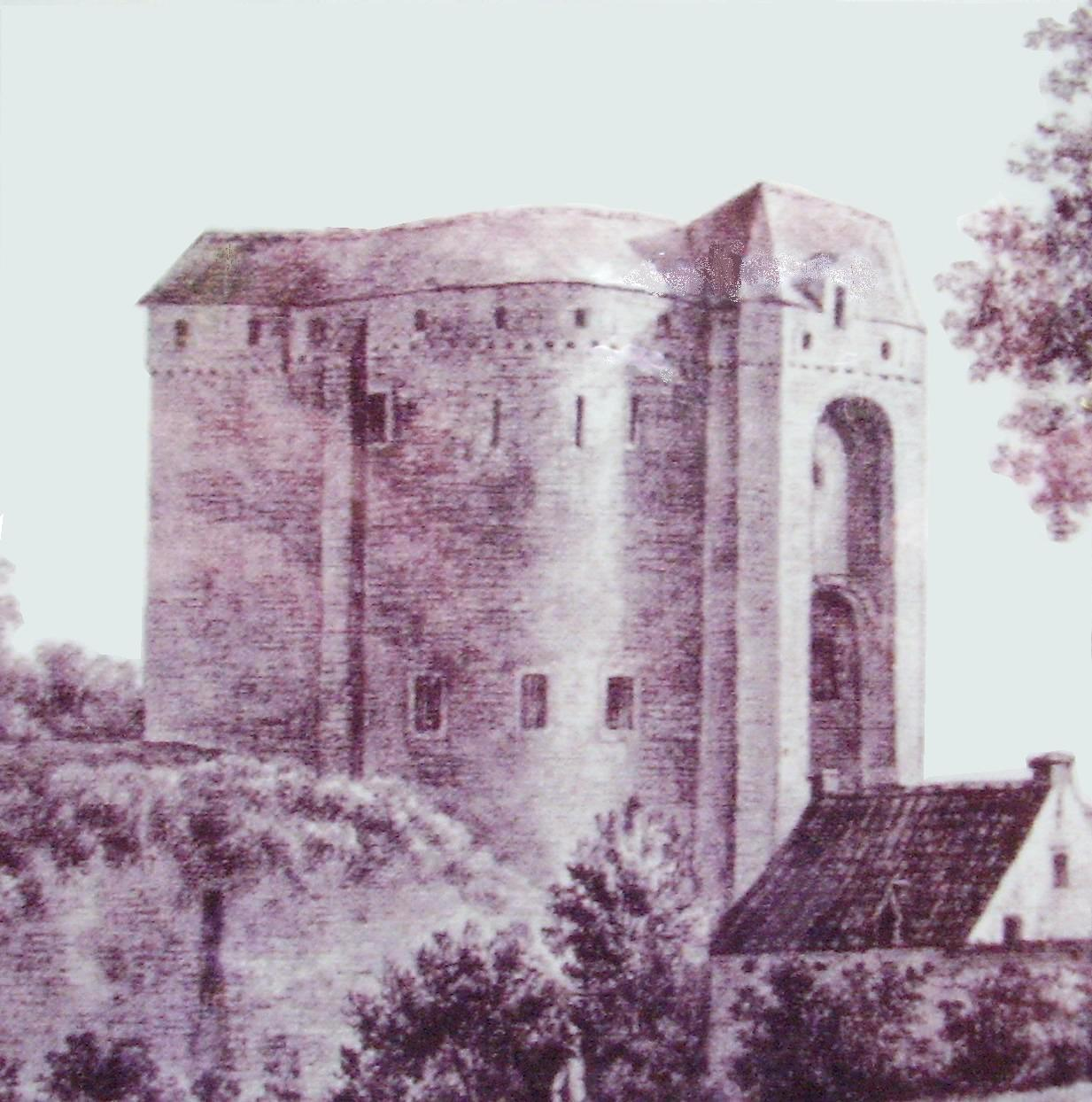
The Halle Gate in 1612

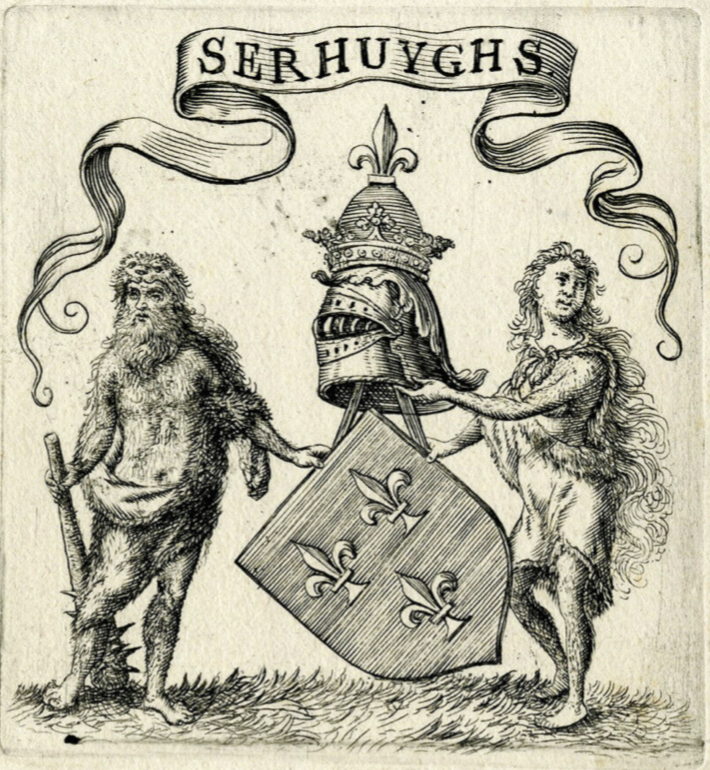
Engraving of the coat of arms of the House of Serhuyghs, 1663

The House of Serhuyghs or Serhuyghs Lineage (French: Lignage Serhuyghs) is one of the Seven Noble Houses of Brussels, along with Sleeus, Roodenbeke, Sweerts, Serroelofs, Steenweeghs, and Coudenberg.

The Serhuyghs House was charged with the defence of the Halle Gate, and was assisted as of 1422 by the Nation of St Lawrence.

== Escutcheon ==
Azure, three fleurs-de-lis couped argent.

== The Seven Noble Houses of Brussels ==
The Seven Noble Houses of Brussels (French: Sept lignages de Bruxelles, Dutch: Zeven geslachten van Brussel) were the seven families of Brussels whose descendants formed the city's patrician class, to whom special privileges were granted until the end of the Ancien Régime. Together with the Guilds of Brussels, they formed the city's bourgeoisie.

== Notable people ==
Name	Birth	Death	Admitted	Known for	Ref.
Goswin de Fierlant	12 August 1654	16 February 1742	13 June 1678	First King of Arms of the Spanish Netherlands, and the Duchy of Burgundy	

== See also ==
History of Brussels
