= Poelaert family =

Belgian bourgeois family

Poelaert family Famille Poelaert
- Current region: Brussels, Belgium
- Origin: Bourgeoisie of Brussels
- Traditions: Architecture, Sculpture
- Architect of the Law Courts of Brussels

The Poelaert family is a Brussels bourgeois family famous for its architects and sculptors. Its most notable member is Joseph Poelaert, architect of the law courts of Brussels.

== See also ==
- Bourgeois of Brussels
