= House of Coudenbergh =

Coudenberg
- Place of origin: Brussels

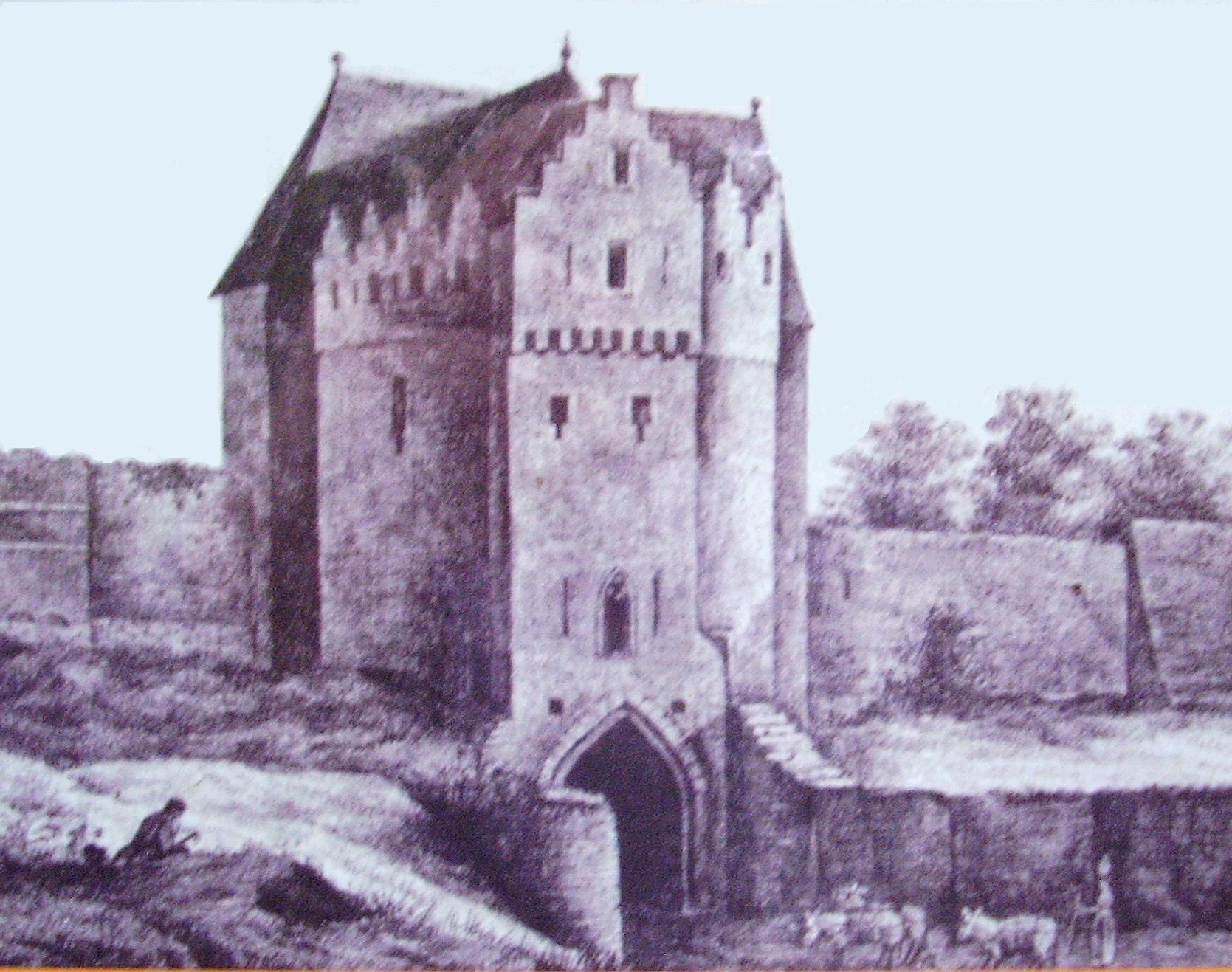
The Cologne Gate in 1612

The House or Lineage of Coudenbergh or Coudenberg (French: Lignage Coudenbergh) is one of the Seven Noble Houses of Brussels, along with Sleeus, Serhuyghs, Steenweeghs, Sweerts, Serroelofs, and Roodenbeke.

The Coudenberg House was charged with the defence of the Cologne Gate, and was assisted as of 1422 by the Nation of St Gery.

== Escutcheon ==
Gules that is Brussels, three towers argent windows gules and gated azure.

== The Seven Noble Houses of Brussels ==
The Seven Noble Houses of Brussels (French: Sept lignages de Bruxelles, Dutch: Zeven geslachten van Brussel) were the seven families of Brussels whose descendants formed the city's patrician class, to whom special privileges were granted until the end of the Ancien Régime. Together with the Guilds of Brussels, they formed the city's bourgeoisie.

== See also ==
History of Brussels
