= List of post-nominal letters (Belgium) =

Post-nominal letters in Belgium include:

== Wallonia ==
Office	Post-nominal
Walloon Merit
Commander	CMW
Officer	OMW
Knight	ChMW
Medal	MMW

== Brussels ==
Office	Post-nominal
Upon admission to the Association Royale des Descendants des Lignages de Bruxelles
All	PB (Patricius Bruxellensis)
Nobles	NPB (Nobilis Patricius Bruxellensis)

== Flanders ==
Office	Post-nominal
Order of the Belgian Cross
Grand Cross	GKBK
Grand Officer	GOBK
Commander	CBK
Officer	OBK
Knight	RBK

== See also ==
- Lists of post-nominal letters
