= Heyvaert =

Heyvaert is a surname. Notable people with the surname include:

- Pol Heyvaert, Belgian theatre director
- Rob Heyvaert, Belgian businessman
- Robrecht Heyvaert, Belgian cinematographer
