= Van Volxem =

Van Volxem is a Belgian surname. Notable people with the surname include:

- Gaston Van Volxem (1893–?), Belgian ice hockey player
- Guillaume Van Volxem (1791–1868), Belgian lawyer and politician
