= House of Sweerts =

Sweerts
- Place of origin: Brussels

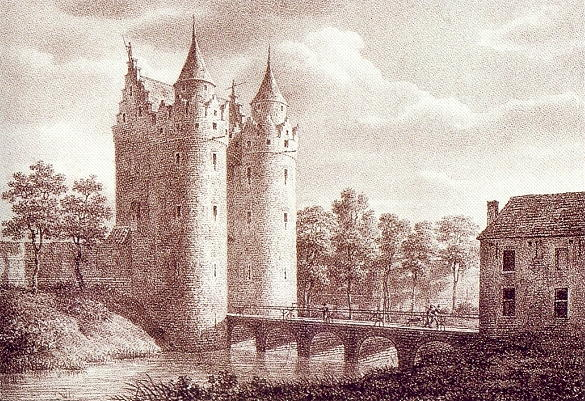
The Flanders Gate, c. 1780

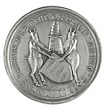
Sweerts crest : a high cap, cut like the shield; Supports: two satyrs.

Primitive Sweerts arms, still borne by members of this lineage around 1250

The House of Sweerts or Sweerts Lineage (French: Lignage Sweerts) is one of the Seven Noble Houses of Brussels, along with Sleeus, Serhuyghs, Steenweeghs, Coudenbergh, Serroelofs, and Roodenbeke.

The Sweerts House was charged with the defence of the Flanders Gate, and was assisted as of 1422 by the Nation of St Giles.

== Escutcheon ==
Party per pale pily of four and a half argent on gules.

== The Seven Noble Houses of Brussels ==
The Seven Noble Houses of Brussels (French: Sept lignages de Bruxelles, Dutch: Zeven geslachten van Brussel) were the seven families of Brussels whose descendants formed the city's patrician class, to whom special privileges were granted until the end of the Ancien Régime. Together with the Guilds of Brussels, they formed the city's bourgeoisie.

== Notable people ==
Name	Birth	Death	Admitted	Known for	Ref.
Henri Van der Noot	7 January 1731	12 January 1827	13 June 1757	Jurist, lawyer, and politician who was one of the leading figures of the Brabant Revolution.	

== See also ==
History of Brussels
