= Guilds of Brussels =

Historic craft associations in Brussels, Belgium

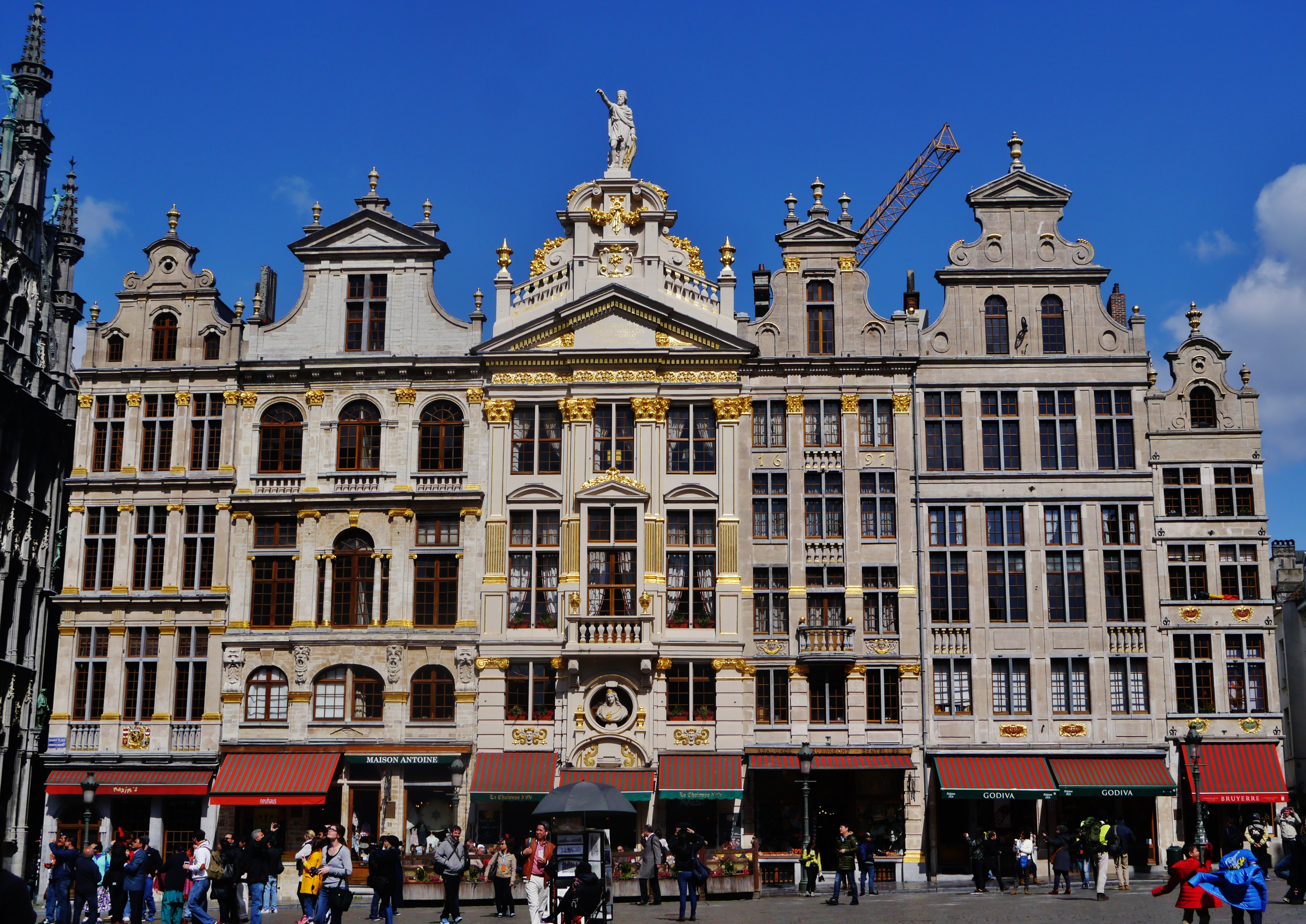
Guildhalls on the Grand-Place/Grote Markt in Brussels

The Guilds of Brussels (French: Guildes de Bruxelles; Dutch: Gilden van Brussel), grouped in the Nine Nations of Brussels (French: Neuf Nations de Bruxelles; Dutch: Negen Naties van Brussel), were associations of craft guilds that dominated the economic life of Brussels in the late medieval and early modern periods. From 1421 onwards, they were represented in the city government alongside the patrician lineages of the Seven Noble Houses of Brussels, later also in the States of Brabant as members of the Third Estate. As of 1421, they were also able to become members of the Drapery Court of Brussels. Together with the Seven Noble Houses, they formed the city's bourgeoisie. Some of their guildhouses can still be seen as part of the Grand-Place/Grote Markt (Brussels' main square), a UNESCO World Heritage Site.

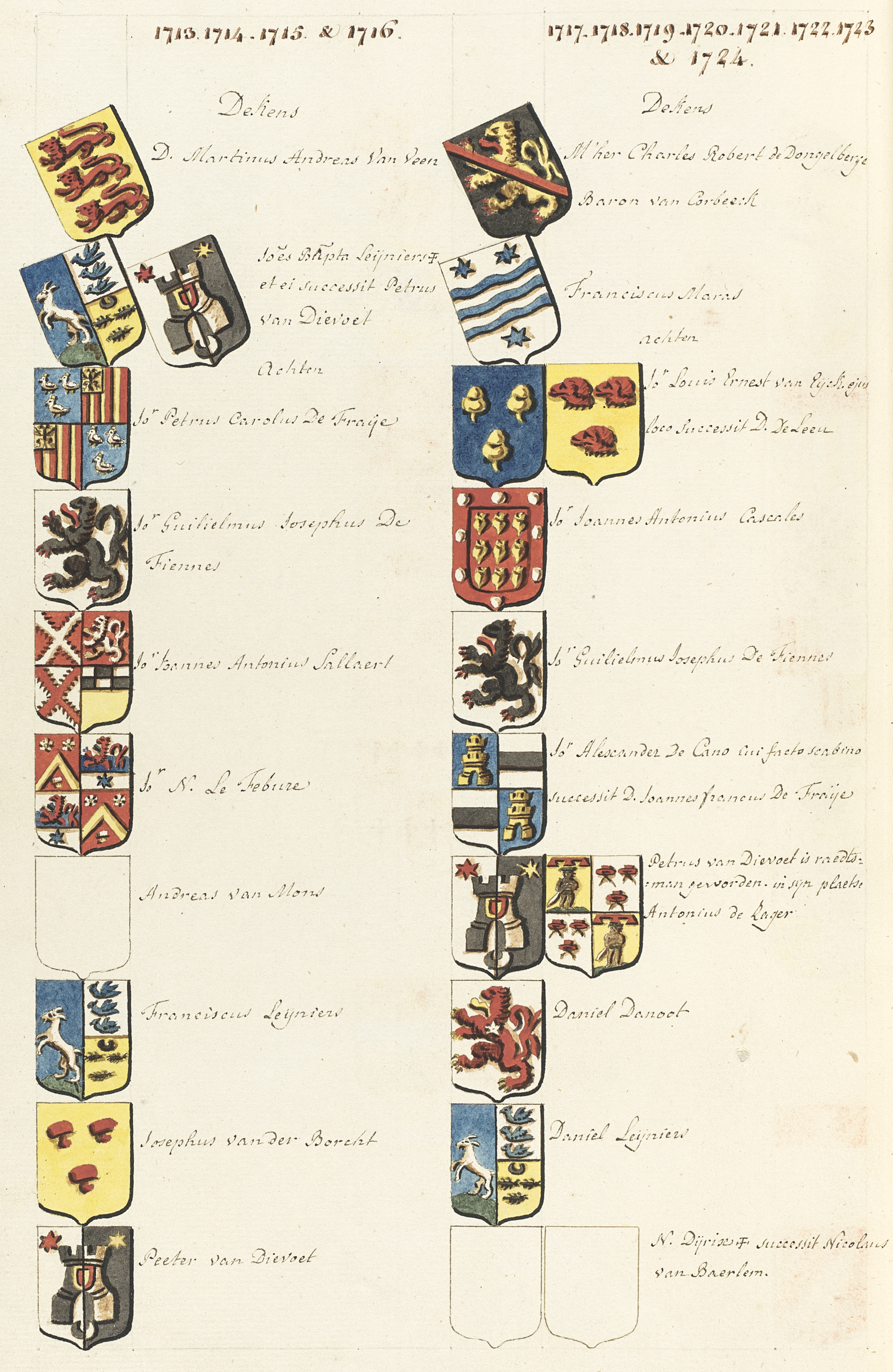
Roll of arms of members of the Drapery Court (1713–1724)

== Composition ==
Rather than being limited to a specific trade, each of the nine "nations" grouped a number of guilds.

These "nations" were:

- Nation of Our Lady: butchers, salt-fishmongers, greengrocers, sawyers, goldsmiths and silversmiths.
- Nation of St Giles: mercers, victuallers, fruiterers, boatmen, plumbers and fresh-fishmongers.
- Nation of St Lawrence: weavers, bleachers, fullers, hatters, tapestry makers and linen weavers.
- Nation of St Gery: tailors, stockingmakers, haberdashers, furriers, embroiderers, second-hand clothes dealers and barber surgeons.
- Nation of St John: blacksmiths, tinsmiths, farriers, pan smiths, cutlers, locksmiths and watchmakers, painters, goldbeaters and glassmakers, saddlers and harness makers, turners, plasterers and stuccatores, thatchers and basket weavers.
- Nation of St Christopher: dyers, cloth shearers, lacemakers and chairmakers.
- Nation of St James: bakers and pastry bakers, millers, brewers, coopers, cabinetmakers, tilers and vintners.
- Nation of St Peter: glovers, tanners, belt makers, shoemakers and cobblers.
- Nation of St Nicholas: armourers and swordsmiths, pedlars, spurriers and gilders, gunsmiths, carpenters, and the stonecutters, masons, sculptors and slaters.

== Abolition ==
The guilds in Brussels, and throughout Belgium, were suppressed in 1795, during the French period of 1794–1815. The furniture and archives of the Brussels guilds were sold at public auction on the Grand-Place in August 1796.

== See also ==
- Drapery Court of Brussels
- Seven Noble Houses of Brussels
- Bourgeois of Brussels
- Livery company
- Leyniers family
- Van der Meulen family
- Van Dievoet family
