= Small Ring, Brussels =

Small ring road of Brussels, Belgium

Coordinates: 50.85701°N 4.3525°E

Brussels Small Ring
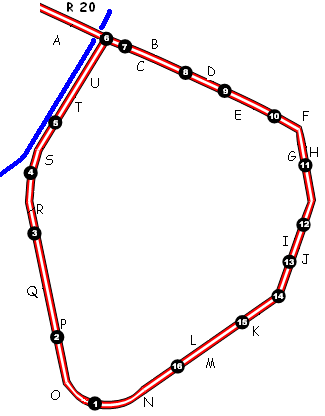

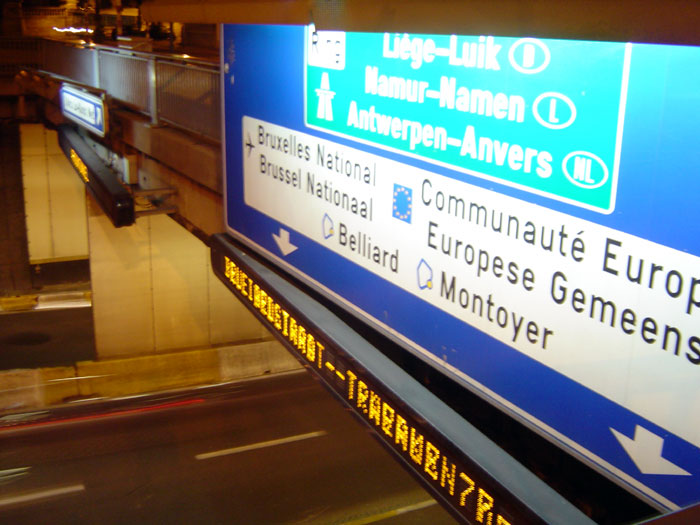

Route information
- Length: 8 km (5.0 mi)

Major junctions
- 1 Porte de Hal / Hallepoort; 2 Gare du Midi / Zuidstation; 3 Porte d'Anderlecht / Anderlechtsepoort; 4 Porte de Ninove / Ninoofsepoort; 5 Porte de Flandre / Vlaanderenpoort; 6 Place Sainctelette / Saincteletteplein; 7 Place de l'Yser / IJzerplein; 8 Porte d'Anvers / Antwerpsepoort; 9 Place Rogier / Rogierplein; 10 Porte de Schaerbeek / Schaarbeeksepoort; 11 Place Madou / Madouplein; 12 Arts-Loi/ Kunst-Wet; 13 Belliard; 14 Place du Trône / Troonplein; 15 Porte de Namur / Naamsepoort; 16 Place Louise / Louizaplein

Location
- Country: Belgium

Highway system
- Transport in Belgium

The Small Ring (French: Petite Ceinture, pronounced [pətit sɛ̃tyʁ]; Dutch: Kleine Ring, pronounced [ˈklɛinə ˈrɪŋ]) inner ring road, formally R20, is a series of roadways in central Brussels, Belgium, surrounding the historic city centre. The city centre is usually defined as the area within the Small Ring; this area is called the Pentagon due to its pentagonal shape. The Pentagon forms the core of the City of Brussels municipality.

The road was built on the site of the 14th-century second walls of Brussels, after they had been torn down. During the second stage of the covering of the Senne in the 20th century, the river was diverted to underneath the western boulevards of the Small Ring. This freed up the main tunnels that had contained the water to allow construction of the Brussels premetro (underground tram) service with minimal disruption to the surface.

The Small Ring is about 8 km (5.0 mi) long. It is surrounded by the Greater Ring, which runs about 30 km (19 mi), and by the main Brussels Ring motorway (about 80 km (50 mi)). The road passes through tunnels allowing vehicles to avoid surface-level traffic lights. It is thus possible to drive through tunnels from Brussels-South railway station to the Place Sainctelette/Saincteletteplein (via Arts-Loi/Kunst-Wet) and then on to the Koekelberg Basilica, or vice versa, without traffic light interruption. The section of the Small Ring between the Place Sainctelette and the South Station via the Anderlecht Gate is completely at surface-level and is thus slower to traverse.

== History ==
In the 14th century, Brussels had a second set of defensive walls built to accommodate the expanding city. There were eight gates built along its length, many of which give their names to squares and intersections along the course of the road. The walls proved fairly useless in combat, not able to prevent either the French bombardment of Brussels in 1695, or French troops from seizing the city in 1746 as part of the War of the Austrian Succession, leaving the defensive works in ruins. By that time, siege was no longer an important part of warfare. Due to the growth of commerce and improved roads, the fortifications did little more than frustrate transit into and out of the city.

In 1782, Emperor Joseph II ordered the dismantling of most fortifications in the Low Countries, including those of Brussels. The dismantling work of the exterior defences began in the east of the city. In 1795, when Republican France invaded and annexed the Low Countries, the demolitions were stopped, not resuming until an order from Napoleon in 1804. The Laeken Gate was demolished in 1808. By an ordinance on 19 May 1810, the French Emperor ordered the second walls demolished and replaced by boulevards with a median in the centre. The fall of the First French Empire prevented the project's immediate execution.

With the return of stability, in 1818, authorities organised a contest for plans to demolish the ramparts and replace them with boulevards suited to the exigencies of contemporary life in the city. The proposal of Jean-Baptiste Vifquain was ultimately chosen. It involved construction of squares and boulevards, with spaces to walk and two to four rows of trees lining the route, a main road and parallel side roads. A barrier with a ditch running its length was still installed, however, and octroi pavilions (French: pavillons d'octroi) built at the entrances, to allow continued taxation of commercial goods entering the city. The work was to be financed by selling the land that was freed up, although this took over twenty years to do.

In the 1950s, with pressure from the automobile, new plans to improve traffic flow were implemented, partly due to the 1958 Brussels World's Fair (Expo 58). Later, tunnels were dug, and one of the main lines of the Brussels Metro now runs primarily underneath the Small Ring.

== Road numbers ==
During the 1980s a new numbering system for national roads was implemented. After the introduction of the R0 to R9 designation for motorway and expressway ring roads in the 1970s, the network of R-roads was expanded to include many Small Ring roads across the country, using the new provincially based numbering system. Within this system the numbers 20 to 29 were available for Brabant province. The Small Ring of Brussels then received a second road number, R20. This designation was originally conceived to include the surface-level sections of the ring where tunnels are available to carry through traffic, as well as the surface-level sections of the N23-West connecting at Sainctelette. R20a and R20b designations were subsequently introduced.

The intermediate ring road has the (partial) designation R21 and the second ring road is the R22, existing only between Verbrande Brug/Pont Brûlé industrial estate and La Cambre/Ter Kameren.

== Roads that make up the Small Ring ==
The Small Ring is actually composed of a set of roads that form a pentagon, or ring.

- A – Boulevard Léopold II / Leopold II laan
- B – Boulevard Baudouin / Boudewijnlaan
- C – Boulevard d'Anvers / Antwerpselaan
- D – Avenue du Boulevard / Boulevardlaan
- E – Boulevard du Jardin Botanique / Kruidtuinlaan
- F – Avenue Galilée / Galiléelaan
- G – Boulevard Bisschoffsheim / Bisschoffsheimlaan
- H – Avenue de l’Astronomie / Sterrenkundelaan
- I – Boulevard du Régent / Regentlaan
- J – Avenue des Arts / Kunstlaan
- K – Avenue Marnix / Marnixlaan
- L – Boulevard de Waterloo / Waterloolaan
- M – Avenue de la Toison d’Or / Guldenvlieslaan
- N – Avenue Henri Jaspar / Henri Jasparlaan
- O – Avenue de la Porte de Hal / Hallepoortlaan
- P – Boulevard du Midi / Zuidlaan
- Q – Boulevard Poincaré / Poincarélaan
- R – Boulevard de l’Abattoir / Slachthuislaan
- S – Boulevard Barthélemy / Barthélémylaan
- T – Boulevard de Nieuport / Nieuwpoortlaan
- U – Boulevard du 9e de Ligne / 9de Linielaan

== Crossroads ==
The Small Ring also crosses a lot of main roads leading to other towns. Some of those crossroads are located next to former gates of the second walls of Brussels and are named after those gates, for instance Porte de Namur/Naamsepoort. On top of the 7 gates of the second walls, some of the gates were built later on to collect taxes at important crossroads, among which the Porte de Ninove/Ninoofsepoort and the Porte d'Anvers/Antwerpsepoort. The only gate to remain is the Porte de Hal/Hallepoort, while at Porte d'Anderlecht/Anderlechtsepoort and at Porte de Ninove/Ninoofsepoort some buildings from the former gate remain.

Starting from the north-east of the Small Ring, place Sainctelette, and going clockwise, the ring crosses successively:

- the Willebroeck Canal at Place Sainctelette/Saincteletteplein
- the Quai de Willebroek /Willebroekkaai at Place de l'Yser/IJzerplein
- the Chaussée d'Anvers/Antwerpsesteenweg (N1 road) at Porte d'Anvers/Antwerpsepoort, leading to Breda via Mechelen and Antwerp
- the Rue du Progrès/Vooruitgangstraat at Place Rogier/Rogierplein
- the Rue Royale/Koningsstraat (N21 road) at Porte de Schaerbeek/Schaarbeeksepoort
- the Chaussée de Louvain/Leuvensesteenweg (N2 road) at Place Madou/Madouplein, leading to Maastricht via Leuven and Hasselt
- the Rue de la Loi/Wetstraat (N3 road) at Arts-Loi/Kunst-Wet, leading to Aachen via Tervuren, Leuven and Liège
- the Rue Belliard/Belliardstraat (N23 road) at Belliard
- the Rue du Trône/Troonstraat at Place du Trône/Troonplein
- the Chaussée de Wavre (N4 road) at Porte de Namur/Naamsepoort, leading to Luxembourg via Wavre, Namur and Arlon
- the Avenue Louise/Louizalaan (N24 road) at Place Louise/Louizaplein
- the Rue de l'Hôtel des Monnaies/Munthofstraat (N7 road) at Hôtel des Monnaies/Munthof, leading to Lille via Tournai)
- the Chaussée de Waterloo/Waterloosesteenweg (N5 road) at Porte de Hal/Hallepoort, leading to France via Waterloo, Charleroi and Couvin
- the Avenue Fonsny/Fonsnylaan at the Brussels-South railway station
- the Chaussée de Mons/Bergensesteenweg (N6 road) at Porte d'Anderlecht/Anderlechtsepoort, leading to Maubeuge via Halle and Mons
- the Chaussée de Ninove/Ninoofsesteenweg (N8 road) at Porte de Ninove/Ninoofsepoort, leading to Koksijde via Ninove, Oudenaarde and Kortrijk
- the Chaussée de Gand/Steenweg op Gent (N9 road) at Porte de Flandre/Vlaamsepoort, leading to Ostend via Ghent and Bruges

== Public transport ==
The Brussels Metro's lines 2 and 6 run under or alongside the Small Ring from the South Station to Place Sainctelette via Arts-Loi/Kunst-Wet, while the section via the Anderlecht gate is serviced by tram routes 51 from Lemonnier to Petit Château/Kleinkasteel and 82 from Lemonnier to the Ninove gate. Bus 89 follows the Small Ring for one stop between the Ninove and Flanders gates. Between Rogier and Botanique/Kruidtuin, bus 61 also drives on the Small Ring, while buses 34, 64 and 80 drive between the Namur gate and Trône/Troon.

== See also ==
- List of streets in Brussels
- History of Brussels
- Belgium in the long nineteenth century
