= Schaerbeek Gate =

Former city gate in Brussels, Belgium

- Porte de Schaerbeek (French); Schaarbeeksepoort (Dutch)
- Part of the second city walls of Brussels
- Brussels, Belgium
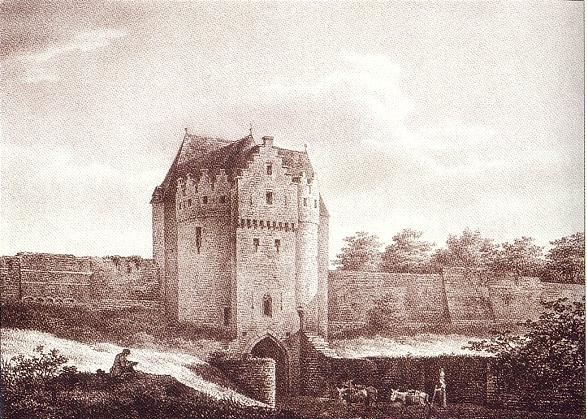
- The Schaerbeek Gate at the end of the 18th century

Site information
- Type: City gate

Location
- Location within Brussels Schaerbeek Gate (Belgium)
- Coordinates: 50°51′10″N 4°21′52″E

Site history
- Built: 14th century
- Materials: Stone

The Schaerbeek Gate (French: Porte de Schaerbeek; Dutch: Schaarbeeksepoort) was one of the medieval city gates of the second walls of Brussels, Belgium.

== See also ==
- Halle Gate, a part of the 14th-century city wall protecting Brussels
- History of Brussels
- Belgium in the long nineteenth century
