= Namur Gate =

Former city gate and current neighbourdhood in Brussels, Belgium

- Porte de Namur (French); Naamsepoort (Dutch)
- Part of the second city walls of Brussels
- Brussels, Belgium
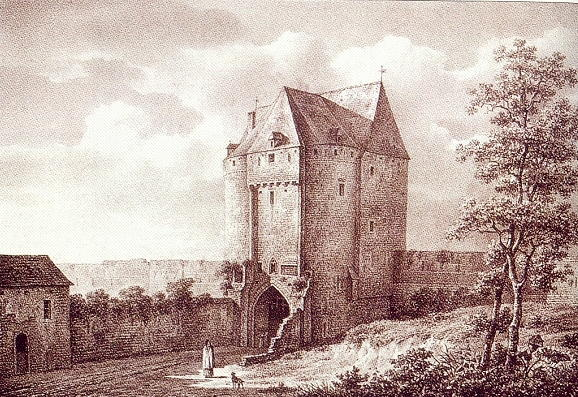
- The Namur Gate at the end of the 18th century

Site information
- Type: City gate

Location
- Location within Brussels Namur Gate (Belgium)
- Coordinates: 50°50′18″N 4°21′43″E

Site history
- Built: 14th century
- Materials: Stone
- Demolished: 1784

The Namur Gate (French: Porte de Namur, pronounced [pɔʁt də namyʁ]; Dutch: Naamsepoort, pronounced [ˈnaːmsəˌpoːrt]) was one of the medieval city gates of the second walls of Brussels, Belgium. Built in the 14th century, it was one of the major entry points on the city's south-eastern side to Ixelles. The gatehouse was demolished in 1784 during the construction of the Small Ring (Brussels' inner ring road). Two pavilion-like buildings were built on the site to collect the octroi in 1836. Although redundant since 1860, these pavilions were moved, and now stand at the entrance of the Bois de la Cambre/Ter Kamerenbos.

Namur Gate remains a toponym denoting the site of the former gate on the edge of the City of Brussels and the Matongé district in Ixelles. This area is served by Porte de Namur/Naamsepoort metro station on lines 2 and 6 of the Brussels Metro.

== History ==
Built in the 14th century, the Namur Gate was one of the seven city gates of the second set of defensive walls that enclosed Brussels. It was originally known as the New Gate of Coudenberg (Dutch: Nieuwe Coudenbergse Poort), to distinguish it from the old gate located in the first walls, and it used to connect the Rue Entre deux Portes/Twee Poortenstraat (current Rue de Namur/Naamsestraat) to the Chemin d'Ixelles/Elsenseweg (current Chaussée d'Ixelles/Elsensesteenweg). The gate was renamed for the city of Namur, now located in Wallonia, to which the road led.

The destruction of the medieval city walls between 1818 and 1840 allowed the creation of a series of wide open boulevards collectively referred to as the Small Ring. On the site of the former gate, two small pavilion-like buildings (French: pavillons d'octroi), designed in the neoclassical style by the architect Auguste Payen, were built in 1836 to collect the octroi on merchandise entering the city. The octroi was abolished in 1860, and the buildings were moved three years later to the entrance of the Bois de la Cambre/Ter Kamerenbos, at the end of the Avenue Louise/Louizalaan. Removing barriers then permitted the Namur Gate area to develop.

In 1866, the pavilions were replaced by the monumental Brouckère Fountain, which was raised in memory of the former mayor of the City of Brussels, Charles de Brouckère, designed by the architect Henri Beyaert and by the sculptors Pierre Dunion and Edouard Fiers. The monument was dismantled in 1955 to allow the rearrangement of boulevards in preparation for the 1958 Brussels World's Fair (Expo 58). It was reinstalled in Laeken, on the Avenue Jean Palfyn/Jean Palfynlaan, opposite the King Baudouin Stadium, in 1977.

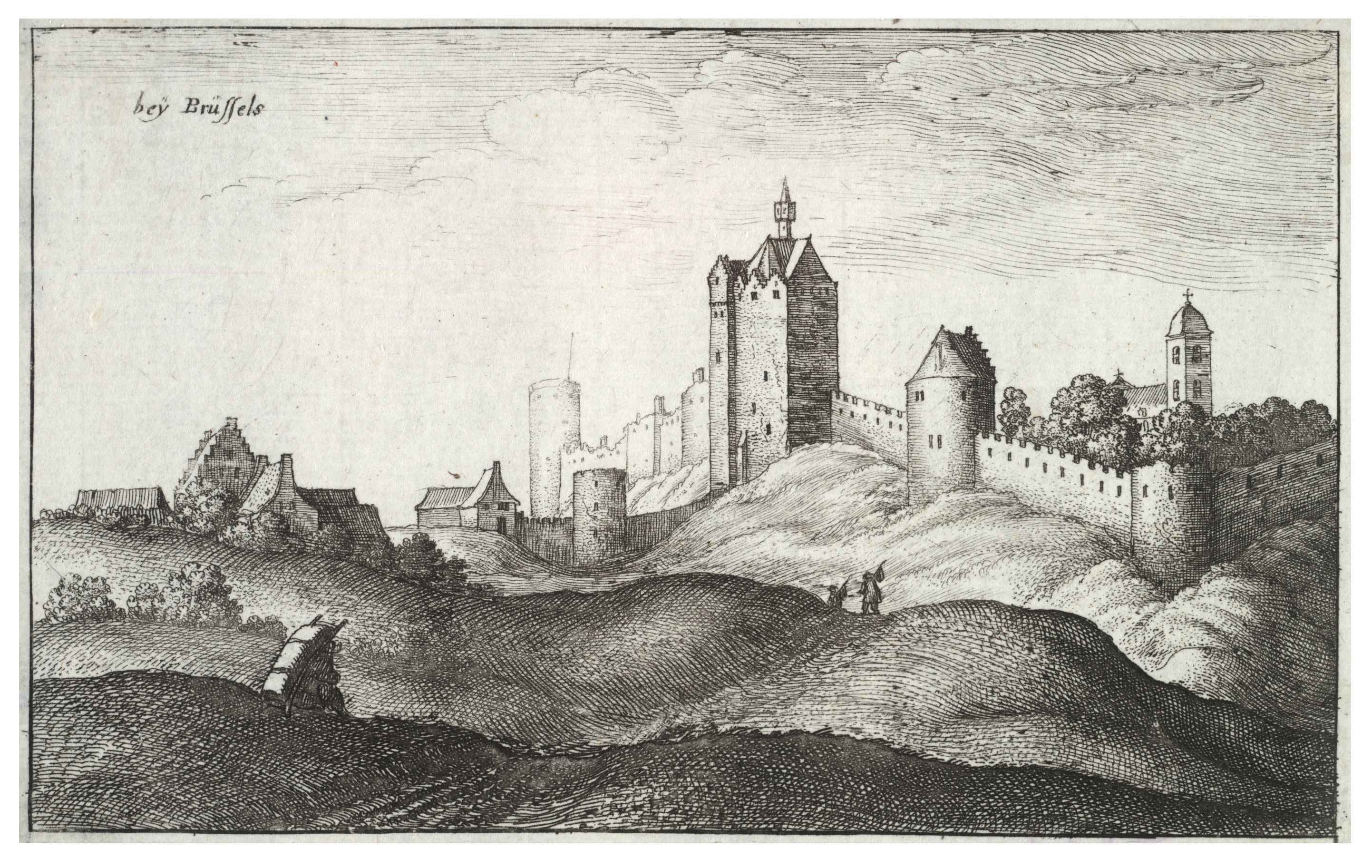
17th-century engraving of the walls of Brussels, by Wenceslas Hollar

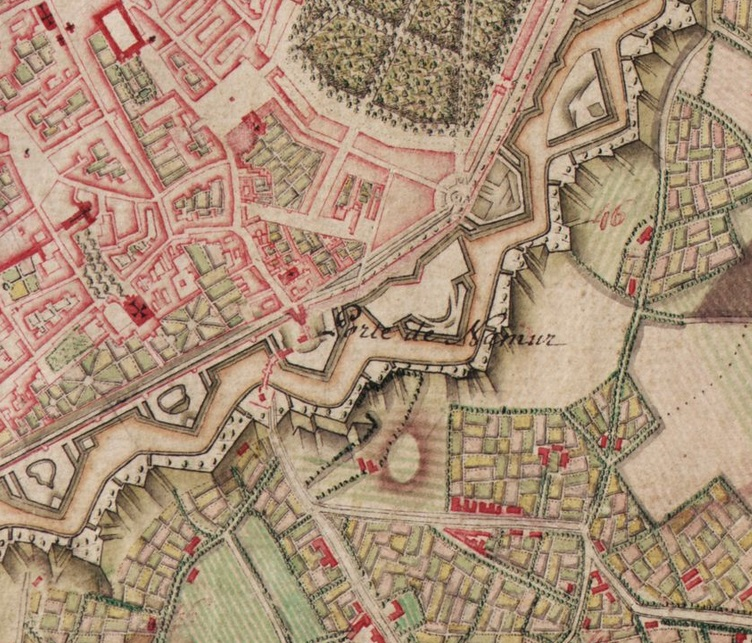
The Namur Gate marked on the 18th-century Ferraris map

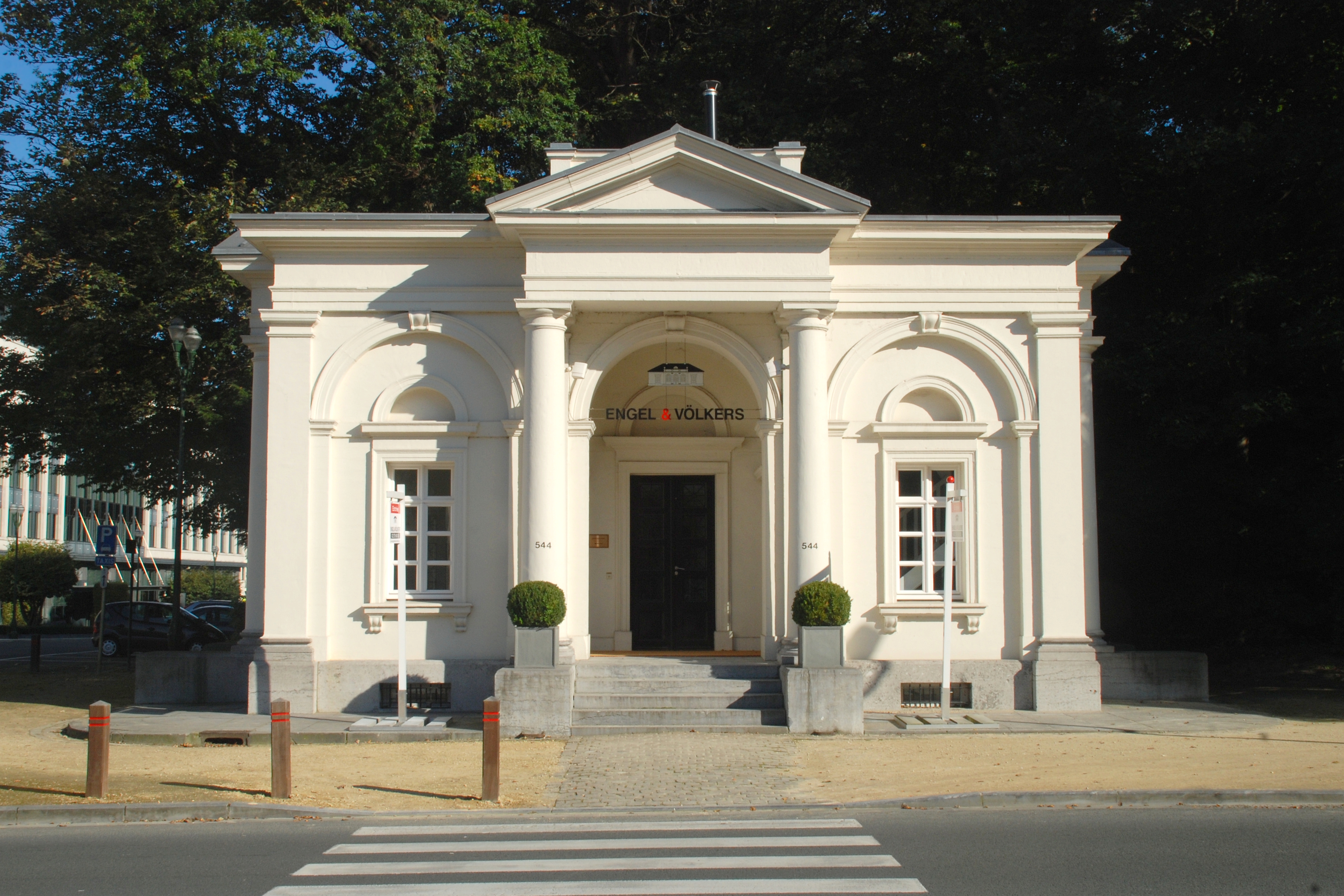
One of the two former octroi pavilions of the Namur Gate, now at the entrance of the Bois de la Cambre/Ter Kamerenbos

== The "Namur Gate" district ==
The toponym Namur Gate ended up designating the whole of the Ixelles neighbourhood, which at the beginning of the 20th century became one of the most popular places in Brussels' upper town, a meeting place for the wealthy class and artists. At that time, the district had many cafés, chic restaurants, luxury shops, performance venues, and later cinemas.

The modernisation of the road infrastructure in the second half of the 20th century ended this period by transforming the district into a place of transit for cars. The Rue du Bastion/Bolwerkstraat, which linked the boulevards to the Chaussée de Wavre/Steenweg op Waver, was removed and replaced by an office tower, the Bastion Tower, and several neoclassical buildings also disappeared (see Brusselisation). Performance venues were transformed into chain stores or fast food outlets.

In the 21st century, the Namur Gate area is once again becoming a busy commercial centre, less elitist than in the past, and one of the liveliest districts in the city. It merges in part with the Matongé district, a meeting place for African communities in Brussels.

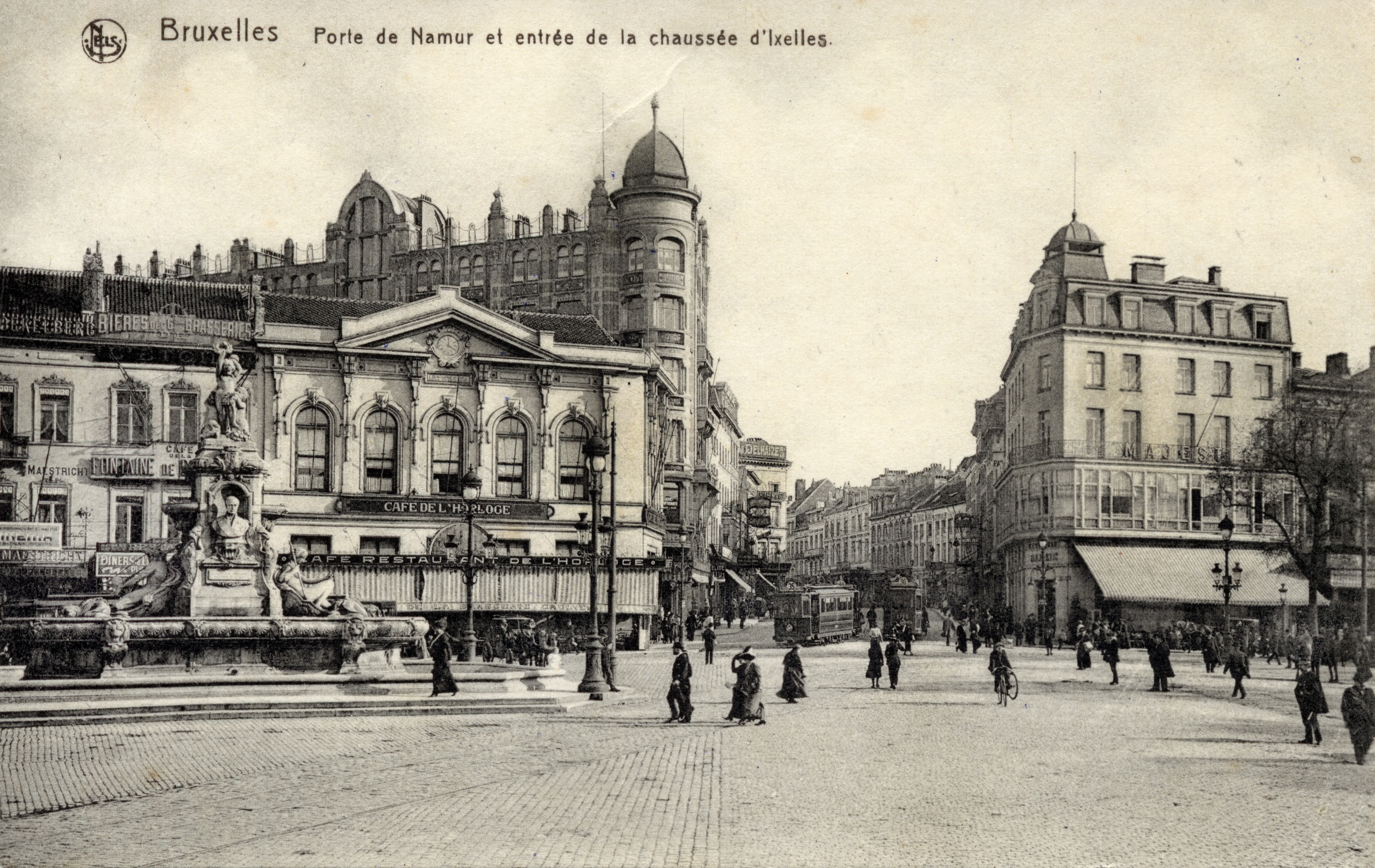
The Namur Gate and the Chaussée d'Ixelles/Elsensesteenweg, c. 1900

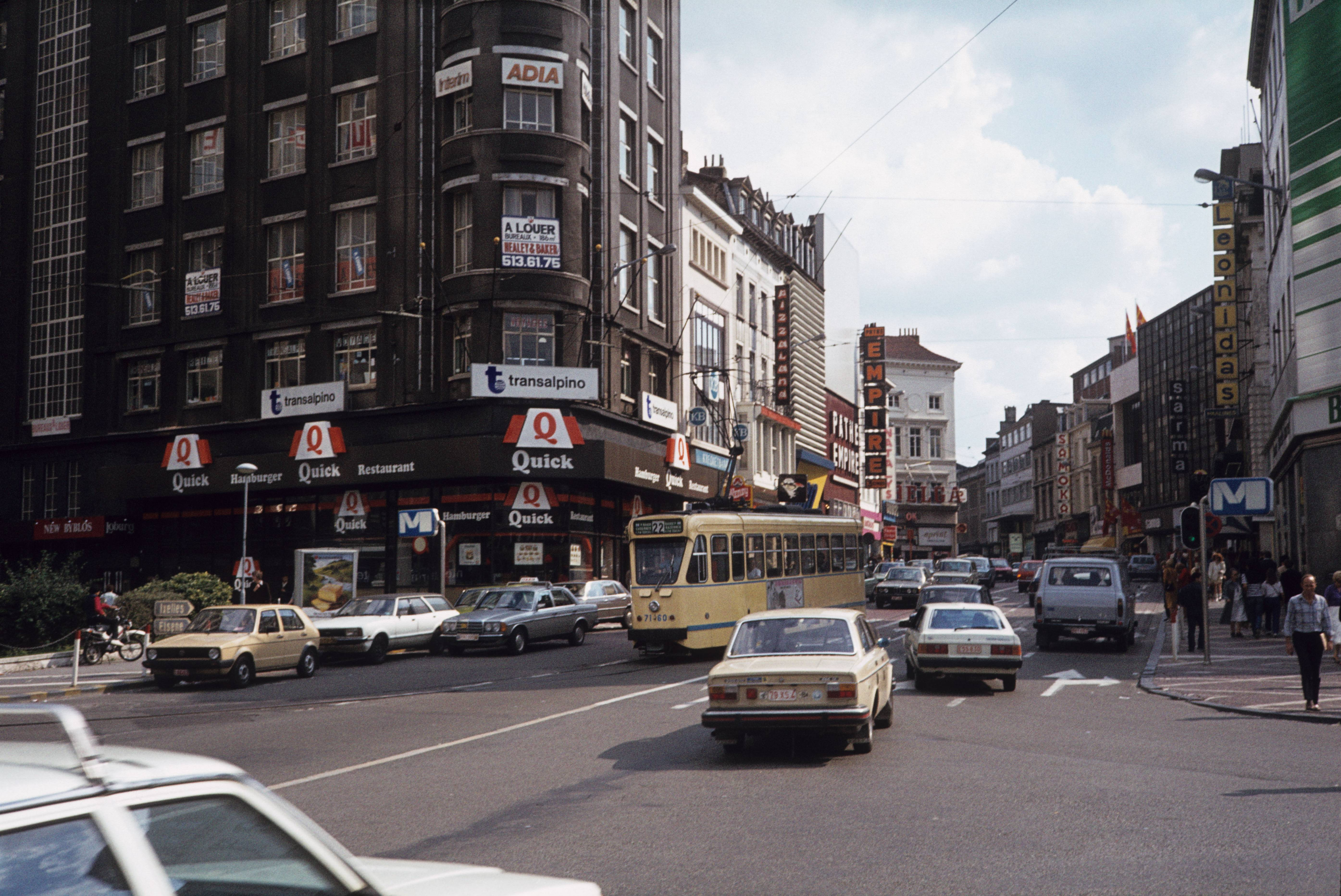
The Namur Gate in the 1980s

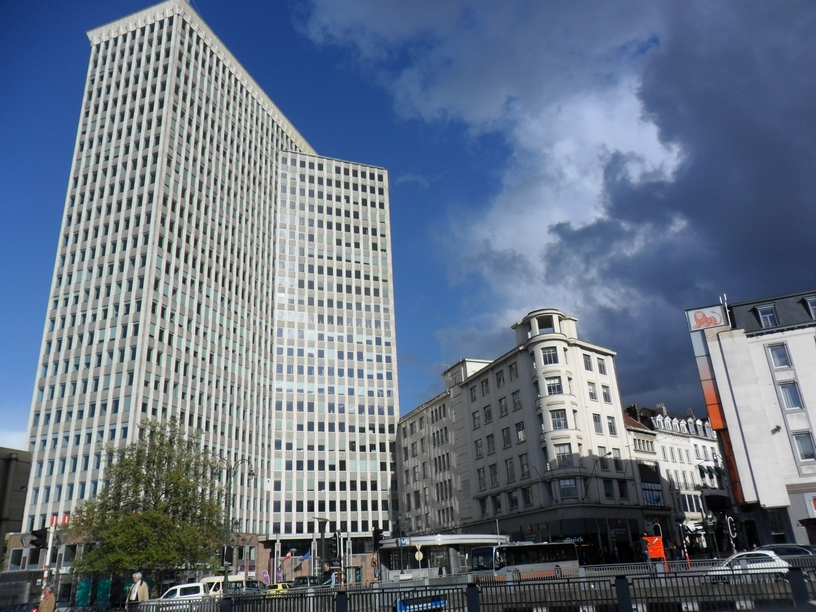
The Namur Gate in the 2010s

== See also ==
- Halle Gate, a part of the 14th-century city wall protecting Brussels
- Neighbourhoods in Brussels
- History of Brussels
- Belgium in the long nineteenth century
