= Laeken Gate =

Former city gate in Brussels, Belgium

- Porte de Laeken (French); Lakensepoort (Dutch)
- Part of the second city walls of Brussels
- Brussels, Belgium
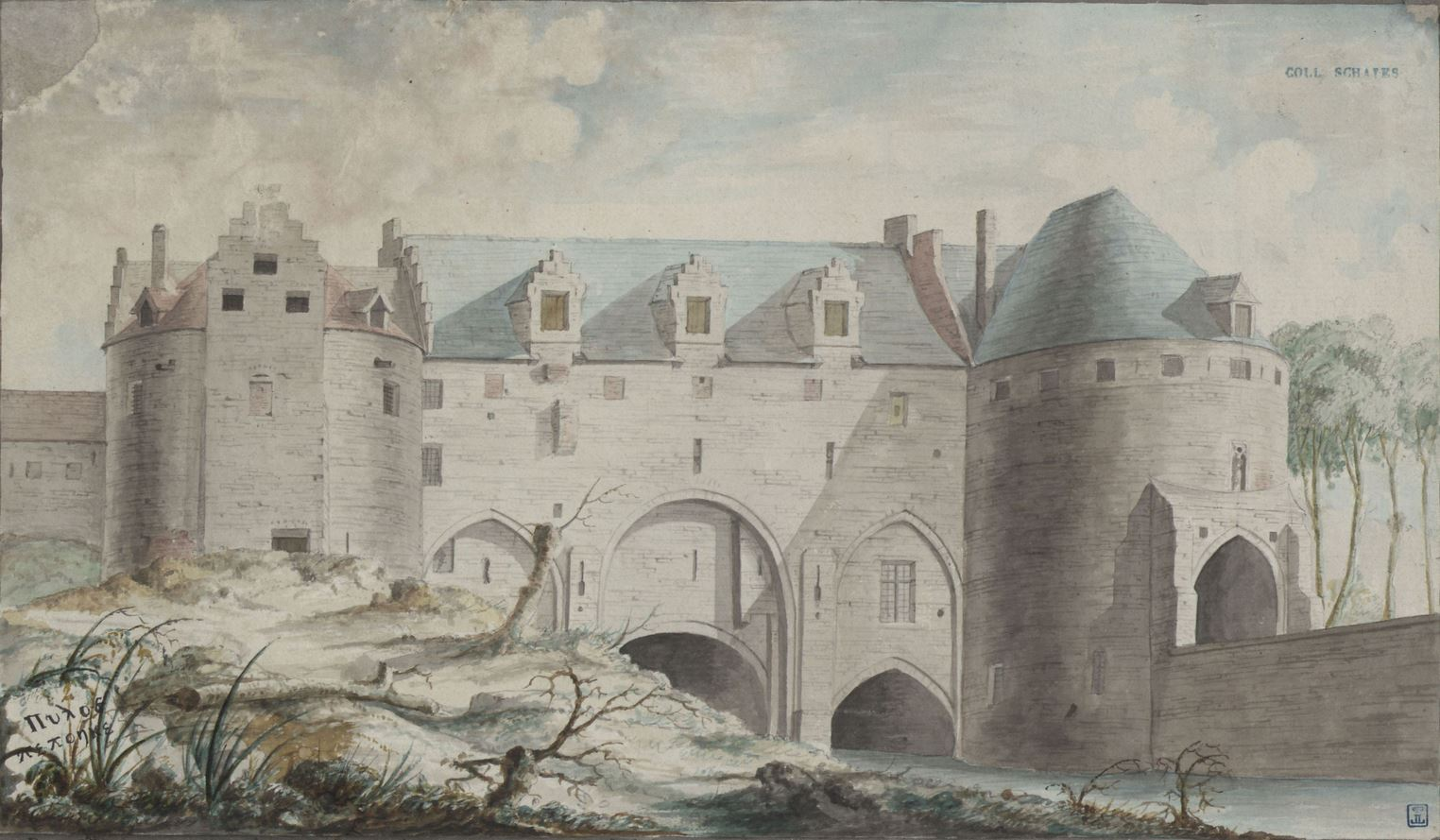
- The Laeken Gate at the end of the 18th century

Site information
- Type: City gate

Location
- Location within Brussels Laeken Gate (Belgium)
- Coordinates: 50°51′22″N 4°21′18″E

Site history
- Materials: Stone

The Laeken Gate (French: Porte de Laeken; Dutch: Lakensepoort) was one of the medieval city gates of the second walls of Brussels, Belgium.

== See also ==
- Halle Gate, a part of the 14th-century city wall protecting Brussels
- History of Brussels
- Belgium in the long nineteenth century
