= Fortifications of Brussels =

Former city walls in Brussels, Belgium

- Fortifications de Bruxelles (French); Vestingwerken van Brussel (Dutch)
- Brussels, Belgium
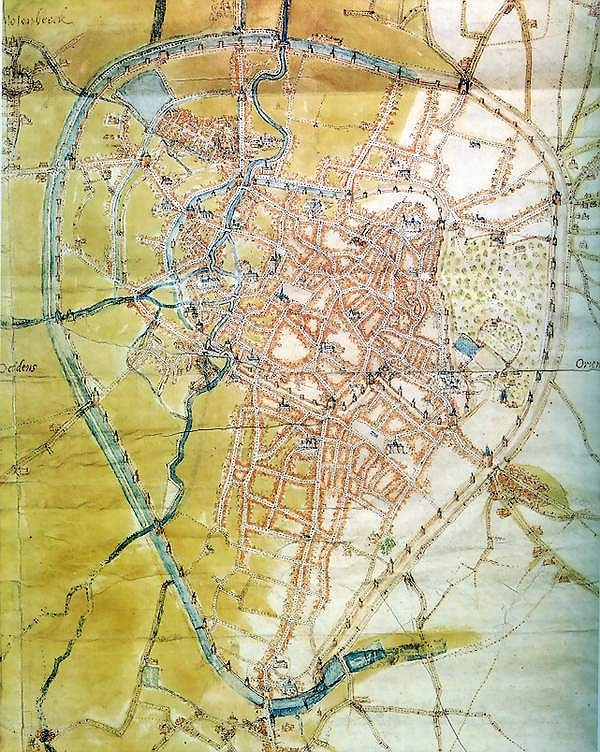
- A 1555 map of Brussels. The inner first walls are less visible than the outer second walls.

Site information
- Type: City walls

Location
- Coordinates: 50.833°N 4.345°E

Site history
- Built: 13th century: first walls; 14th century: second walls
- Materials: Stone

The Fortifications of Brussels (French: Fortifications de Bruxelles; Dutch: Vestingwerken van Brussel) refers to the medieval city walls that surrounded Brussels, Belgium, built primarily to defend the city but also for administrative reasons. There were two stages of fortifications of Brussels: the first walls, built in the early 13th century, and the second walls, built in the late 14th century and later upgraded. In the 19th century, the second walls were torn down and replaced with the Small Ring, a series of boulevards bounding the historical city centre. Nowadays, only a few sections of each walls remain, most notably the Halle Gate.

== First walls ==
The first walls of Brussels (French: première enceinte, Dutch: eerste stadsomwalling) were a series of fortifications erected around Brussels in the early 13th century. The city quickly outgrew them, and starting in 1356, a second, larger set of walls was built to better enclose and defend the city. The now superfluous walls were dismantled between the 16th and 18th centuries. Isolated portions of the first walls can still be seen today.

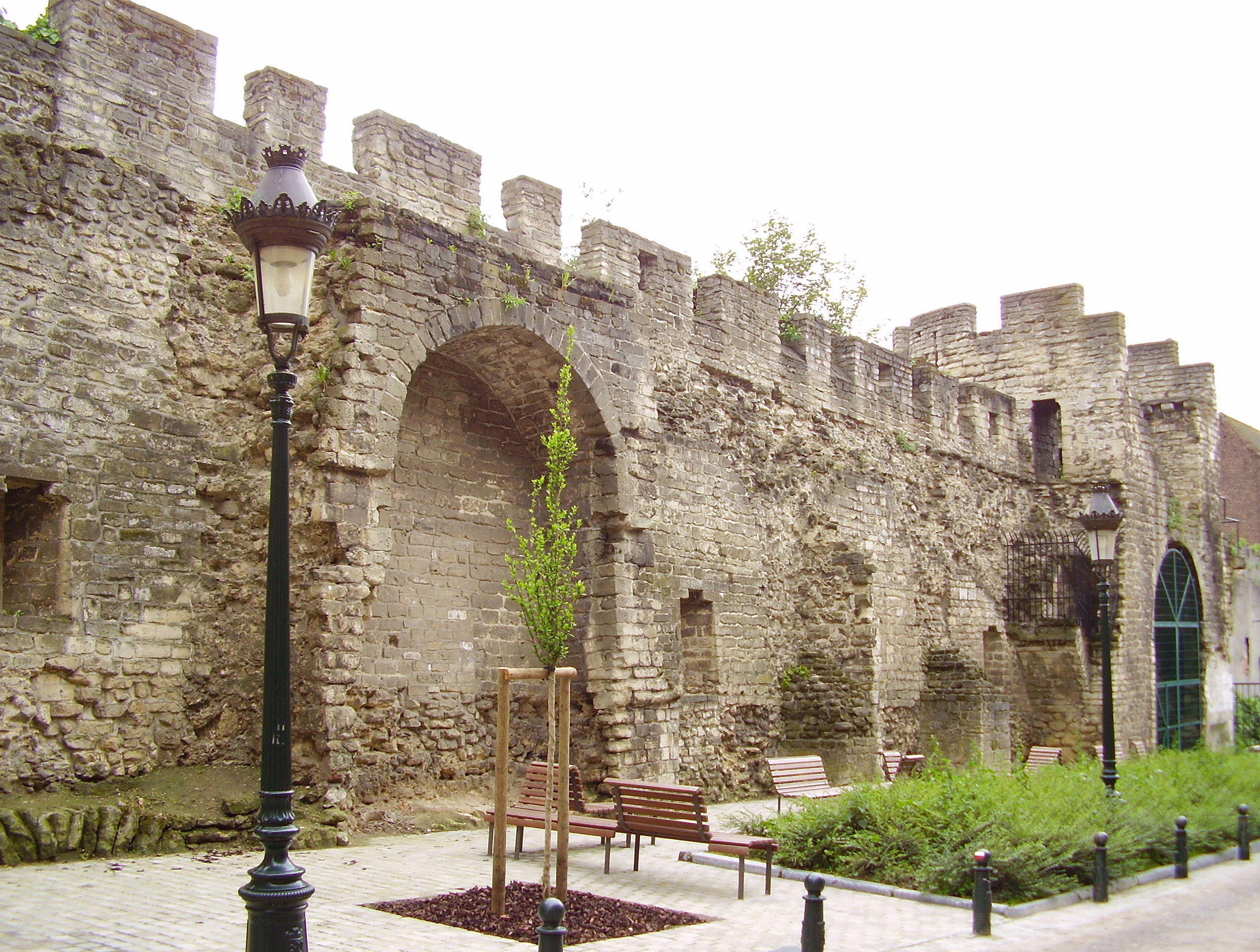
A section of Brussels' first walls, seen from inside the walls

=== Construction ===
Construction of the first walls of Brussels is estimated to have taken place at the beginning of the 13th century, during the reign of Henry I, the first duke of Brabant. The beginning and end dates are not clear, but construction would have lasted several decades. On the other hand, from historical maps and other documents which have been preserved, the precise former course of the walls is known.

The walls were 4 kilometres (2.5 mi) long. In the west, they encompassed Saint-Géry/Sint-Goriks Island (the site of the city's founding and first development, where today's Halles Saint-Géry/Sint-Gorikshallen are located), the Grand-Place/Grote Markt (the city's main square), and the first port on the river Senne. They extended to the heights in the east of the city, enclosing the first Cathedral of St. Michael and St. Gudula (then a collegiate church) on the Treurenberg hill (French: Mont des pleurs; "Mount of tears"), where the St. Gudula Gate stood (integrated in these first walls), and which was later used as a notorious prison, hence its name, as well as the ducal palace of Coudenberg.

The walls were initially made of earth, with a wooden fence on top. These gave way to walls made of stone that were 10 metres (33 ft) tall and 1 to 2.5 metres (3 to 8 ft) thick. The walls were supported by square pillars, spaced roughly 4 metres (13 ft) apart, linked by a row of arches for support. These were buried underneath a talus, and they supported the main wall, which had a number of arrow slits in it. A second arcade supported a crenellated parapet, where defenders could stand. A large ditch was dug in front of the walls, and in places this could be flooded with water to form a moat if needed.

Along the length of the walls, there were roughly forty defensive towers, in addition to seven primary gates and five smaller entrances. One of the towers of the stretch between the Treurenberg and Coudenberg was known as the Matthieu Tower or Tower of the Bank Matthieu, as it stood in the backyard of the mansion of the Matthieu banking family. It survived until that mansion's partial reconstruction in 1909.

=== Flemish invasion ===
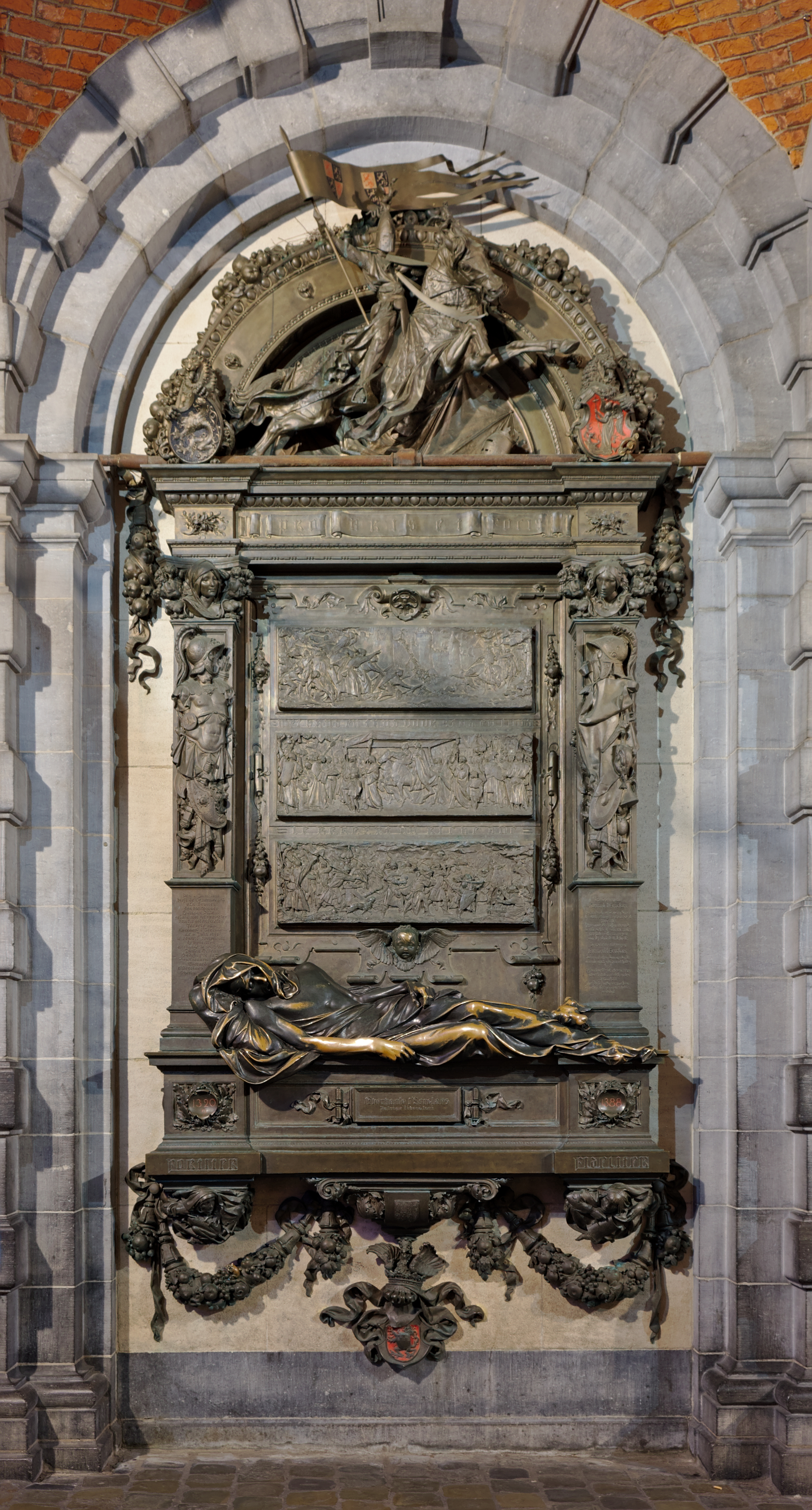
Everard t'Serclaes monument in Brussels. t'Serclaes scaled the first walls to retake Brussels from the Flemings, and would participate in the second walls' planning.

The death of Duke John III of Brabant in 1355 sparked a succession crisis. As both of his sons had died, he left the throne to his daughter Joanna and her husband Wenceslaus I of Luxembourg. Count Louis II of Flanders had married Joan's younger sister Margaret and thought the throne should be his. Louis invaded Brabant and quickly seized Brussels, planting the Flemish lion flag in the middle of the Grand-Place. The city walls offered relatively little protection.

During the night of 24 October 1356, a group of Brabantian patriots led by Everard t'Serclaes scaled the city walls and drove the Flemings from the city. This enabled Joanna and Wenceslaus to make their Joyous Entry into Brussels, granting a charter of liberties that would be seen as the equivalent of the Magna Carta for the Low Countries.

=== New walls proposed ===
Since the construction of the first walls in the 13th century, Brussels had grown extensively and had become quite important. On account of this growth, the first walls were no longer large enough, as the city had begun to spread out beyond them. It had become clear that further defences, better adapted to the current era, needed to be constructed. Following the succession crisis, city authorities decided to build a new set of walls. Everard 't Serclaes, who had been named schepen (alderman), was among those contributing to the decision.

== Second walls ==
The second walls of Brussels (French: seconde enceinte, Dutch: tweede stadsomwalling) were erected between 1356 and 1383. The wall was to have a length of nearly 8 km (5 mi), which was enough to enclose the surrounding hamlets and fields that supplied the city. There were to be 72 semicircular towers along the wall. There were seven main gates, corresponding to the seven entries into the first walls of Brussels, but the similarities mostly end there. The second walls were a monumental project and represented a colossal undertaking for the period. The design was fairly typical of medieval defences before the introduction of gunpowder, and was surrounded by a moat in the lower parts of the city. The two sets of walls coexisted until the 16th century, when the original set of walls began to be dismantled.

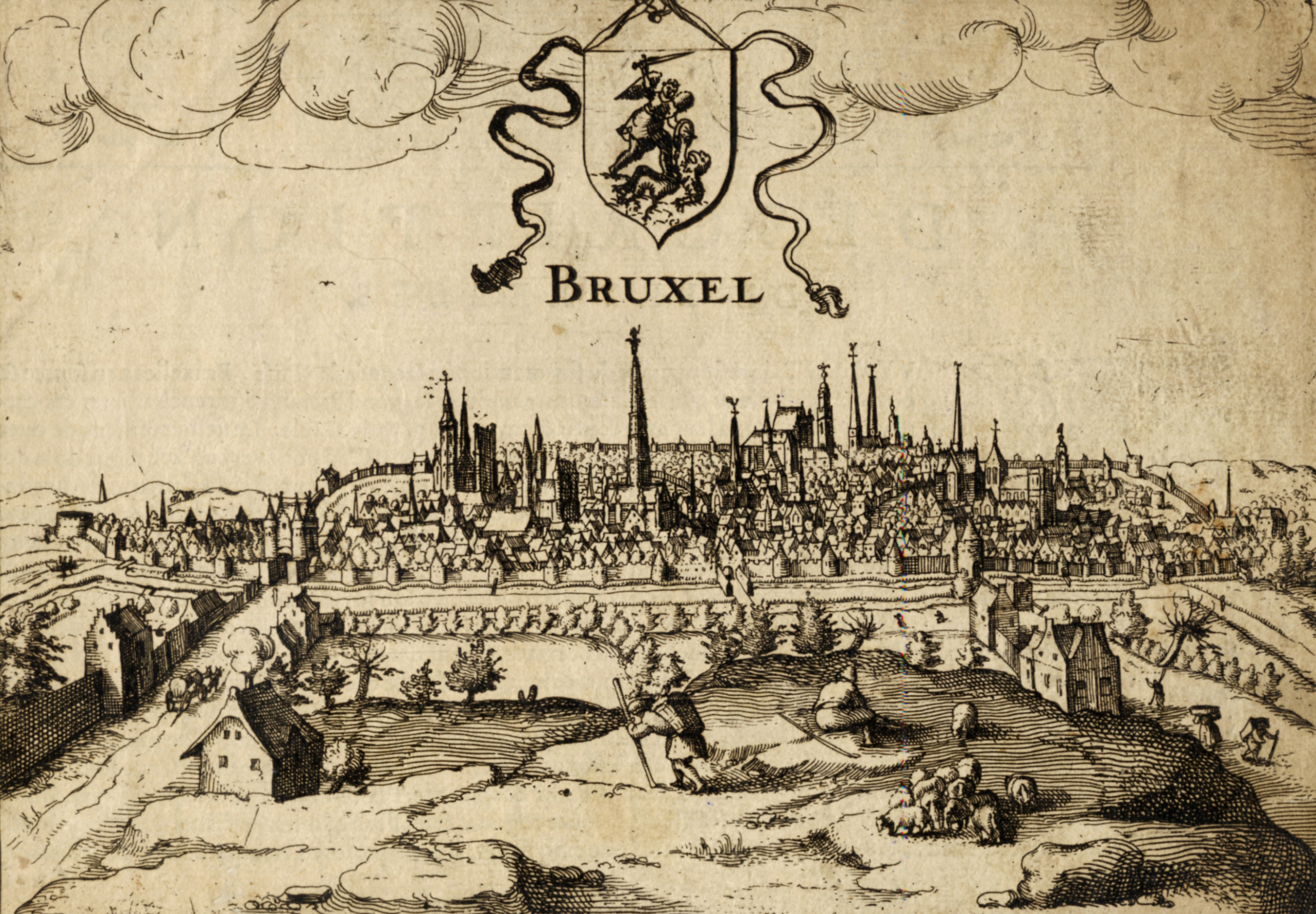
An engraving of Brussels showing the city's second walls, c. 1610

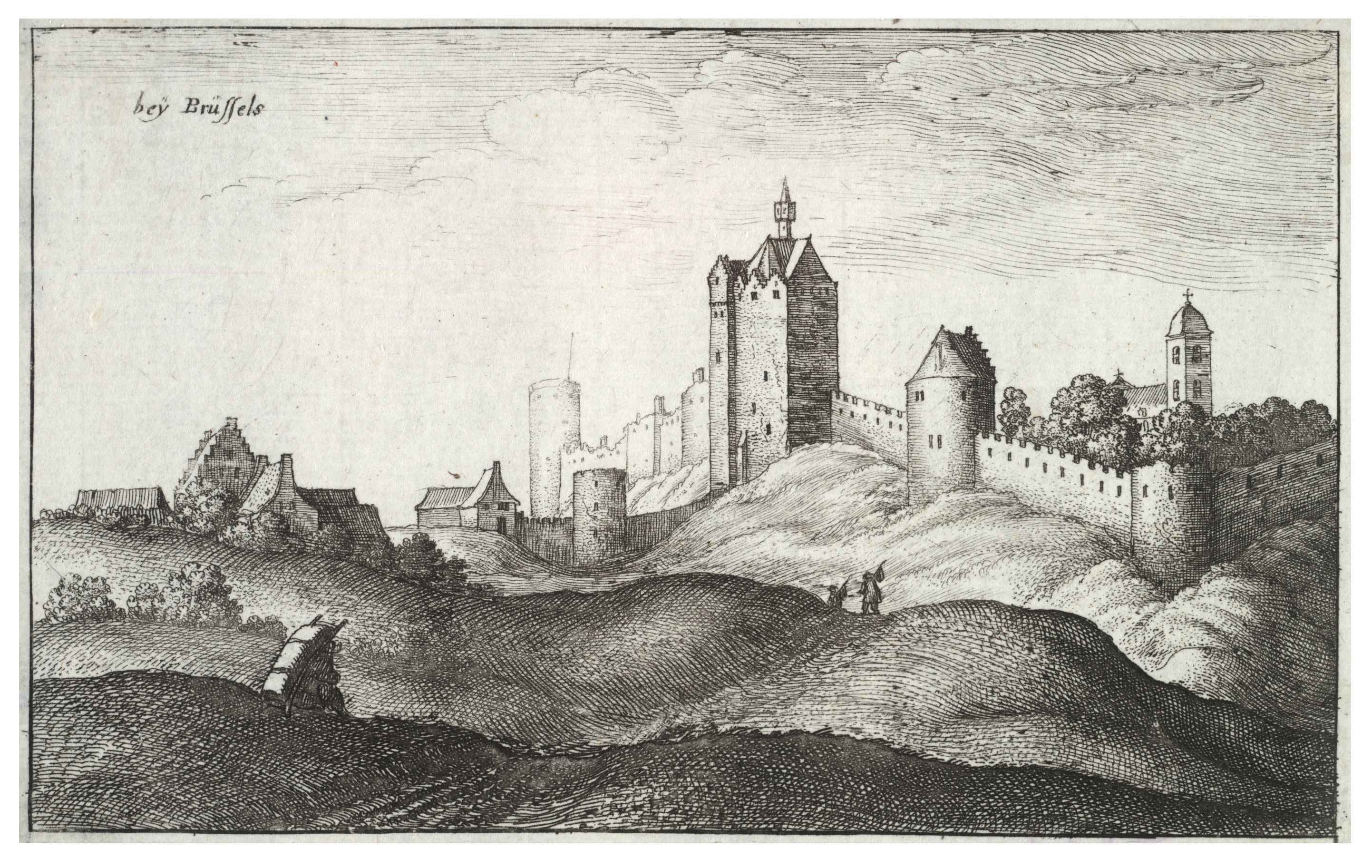
17th-century engraving of Brussels' second walls, by Wenceslas Hollar

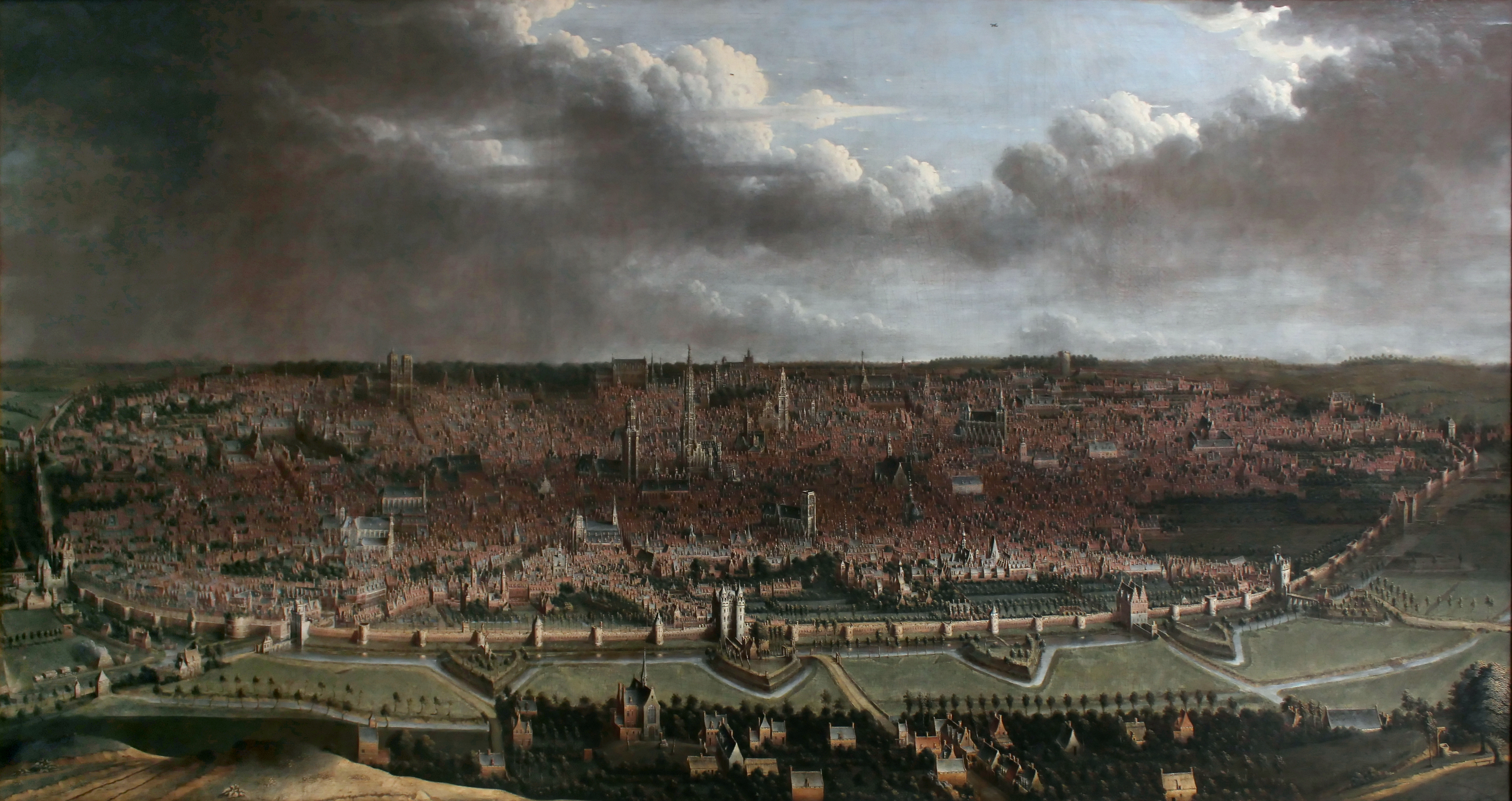
Panoramic view of Brussels and its walls in the 17th century, by Jan Baptist Bonnecroy

=== Evolution of defences ===
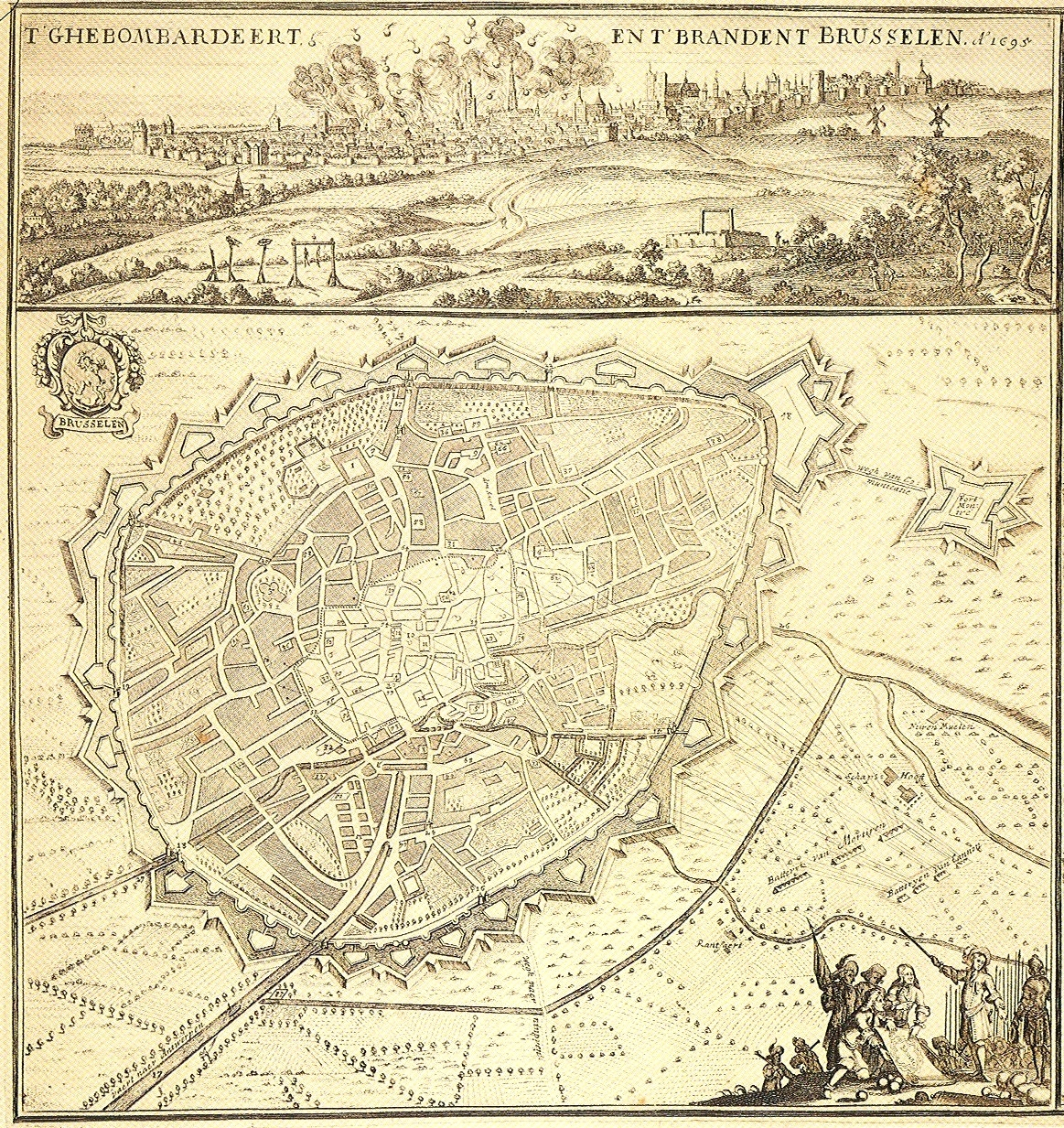
Map of Brussels immediately following the 1695 bombardment. The white areas in the centre are the areas destroyed. The Fort of Monterey is visible on the right. North is roughly to the bottom-left.

In the 16th century, there were seven gates: Laeken, Flanders, Anderlecht, Halle, Namur, Leuven and Schaerbeek, each named for the direction of the road leading out of the gate. An eighth was added in 1561, the Shore Gate (French: Porte du Rivage, Dutch: Oeverpoort), designed to control access to the Port of Brussels from the newly constructed Willebroek Canal.

In the 16th and 17th centuries, new siege weapons and techniques, including the advent of artillery, forced the city to modernise the defences in order to keep potential attackers at a safe distance from the walls, including the addition of ditches, bastions and ravelins. The Fort of Monterey was the most important defensive work, its name coming from the Spanish count responsible for modernising the defences. The fort was built between 1672 and 1675, by the military engineers Merex and Blom, on the heights of Obbrussel (Old Dutch: Obbrusselsche, for "Upper Brussels", now Saint-Gilles), south of the Halle Gate. As with the rest of the city's fortifications, the fort was ineffective, and was not able to prevent the French bombardment of Brussels in 1695, from the heights of Scheut, in Anderlecht, as part of the War of the Grand Alliance. The defensive works proved equally ineffective when French troops seized the city in 1746 during the War of the Austrian Succession, leaving the defensive works in ruins. By that time, siege was no longer an important part of warfare. Due to the growth of commerce and improved roads, the fortifications did little more than frustrate transit into and out of the city.

In 1782, Emperor Joseph II ordered the dismantling of most fortifications in the Low Countries, including those of Brussels. The dismantling work of the exterior defences began in the east of the city. The Fort of Monterey was sold and destroyed, and all of the gates were razed with the exception of the Laeken Gate and the Halle Gate.

In 1795, when Republican France invaded and annexed the Low Countries, the demolitions were stopped, not resuming until an order from Napoleon in 1804. The Laeken Gate was demolished in 1808. By an ordinance on 19 May 1810, the French Emperor ordered the second walls demolished and replaced by boulevards with a median in the centre. The fall of the First French Empire prevented the project's immediate execution.

== Construction of the Small Ring ==
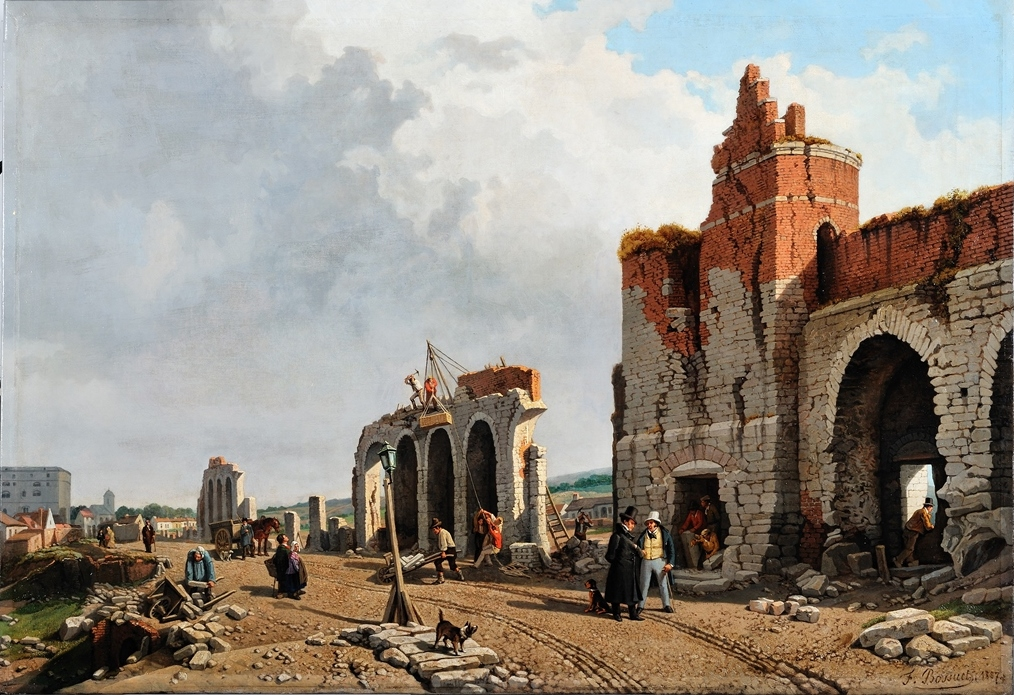
Demolition of the walls between the Halle Gate and the Anderlecht Gate

With the return of stability, in 1818, authorities organised a contest for plans to demolish the ramparts and replace them with boulevards suited to the exigencies of contemporary life in the city. The proposal of Jean-Baptiste Vifquain was ultimately chosen. It involved construction of squares and boulevards, with spaces to walk and two to four rows of trees lining the route, a main road and parallel side roads. A barrier with a ditch running its length was still installed, however, and octroi pavilions (French: pavillons d'octroi) built at the entrances, to allow continued taxation of commercial goods entering the city. The extension of the canal to the west of the city was also envisioned, but that would not be effected until the construction of the Brussels–Charleroi Canal around 1830. The work was to be financed by selling the land that was freed up, although this took over twenty years to do.

In 1830, as Belgium gained its independence, demolition work had reached the Halle Gate. Since its closing, it had served as a military prison, and later as storage of archives. The new government decided to spare it. In 1840, the street just inside of the gate was raised 3 metres (10 ft), making it impassable to vehicles. From 1868 to 1871, as the city was being modernised, the architect Henri Beyaert, with little regard for historical accuracy, transformed the austere medieval tower into something of a neo-Gothic castle, which fit better with the contemporary romantic perception of the Middle Ages.

In 1860, the taxes on commercial goods were lifted, and the last barrier between Brussels and its suburbs was destroyed. The intersections at the Anderlecht Gate and the Ninove Gate are the only two where the octroi pavilions still stand. Those of the Namur Gate were moved, and now stand at the end of the Avenue Louise/Louizalaan, at the entrance to the Bois de la Cambre/Ter Kamerenbos.

Although modified, the Halle Gate is the last remnant of the second walls of Brussels. Their course can be seen by the current Small Ring, although it stops short of the Halle Gate, and they still define downtown Brussels, often called the Pentagon. In the 1950s, with pressure from the automobile, new plans to improve traffic flow were implemented, partly due to the 1958 Brussels World's Fair (Expo 58). Later, tunnels were dug, and one of the main lines of the Brussels Metro now runs primarily underneath the Small Ring. Nowadays, the Small Ring is a major arterial ring road.

== Gallery ==
=== First walls ===
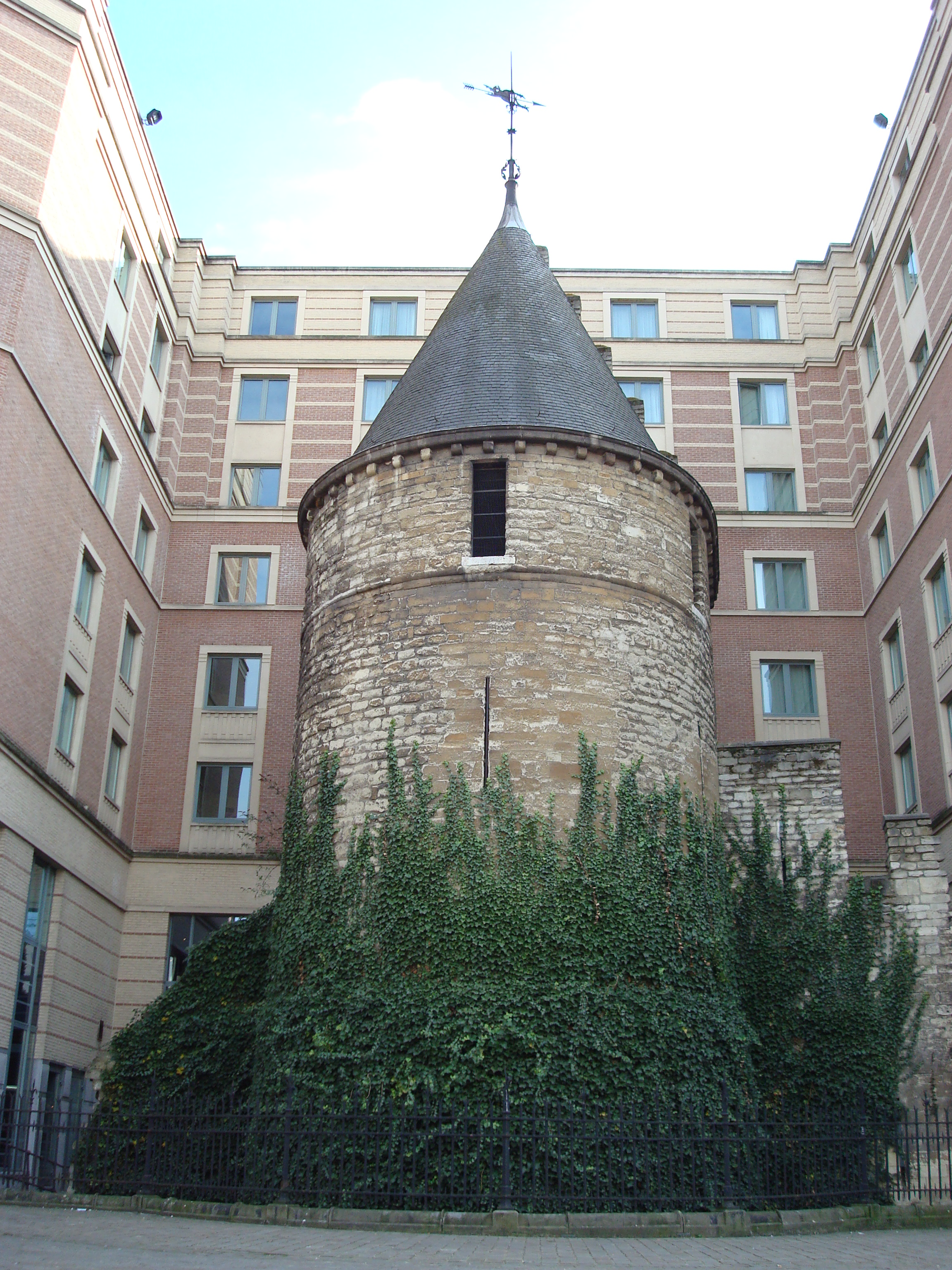
The Black Tower, behind the Church of St. Catherine, in the city centre

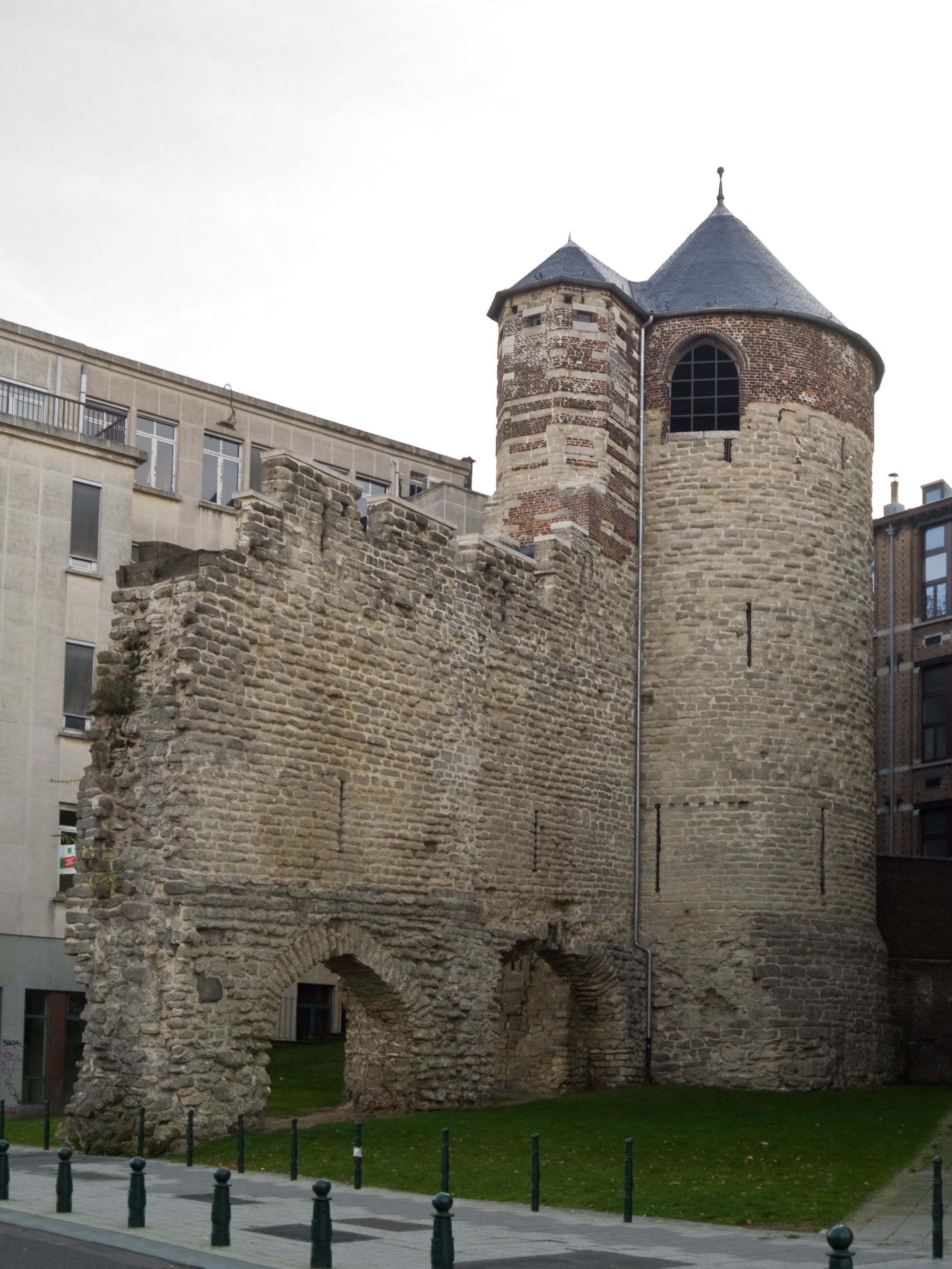
The Anneessens Tower or Angle Tower, outside view

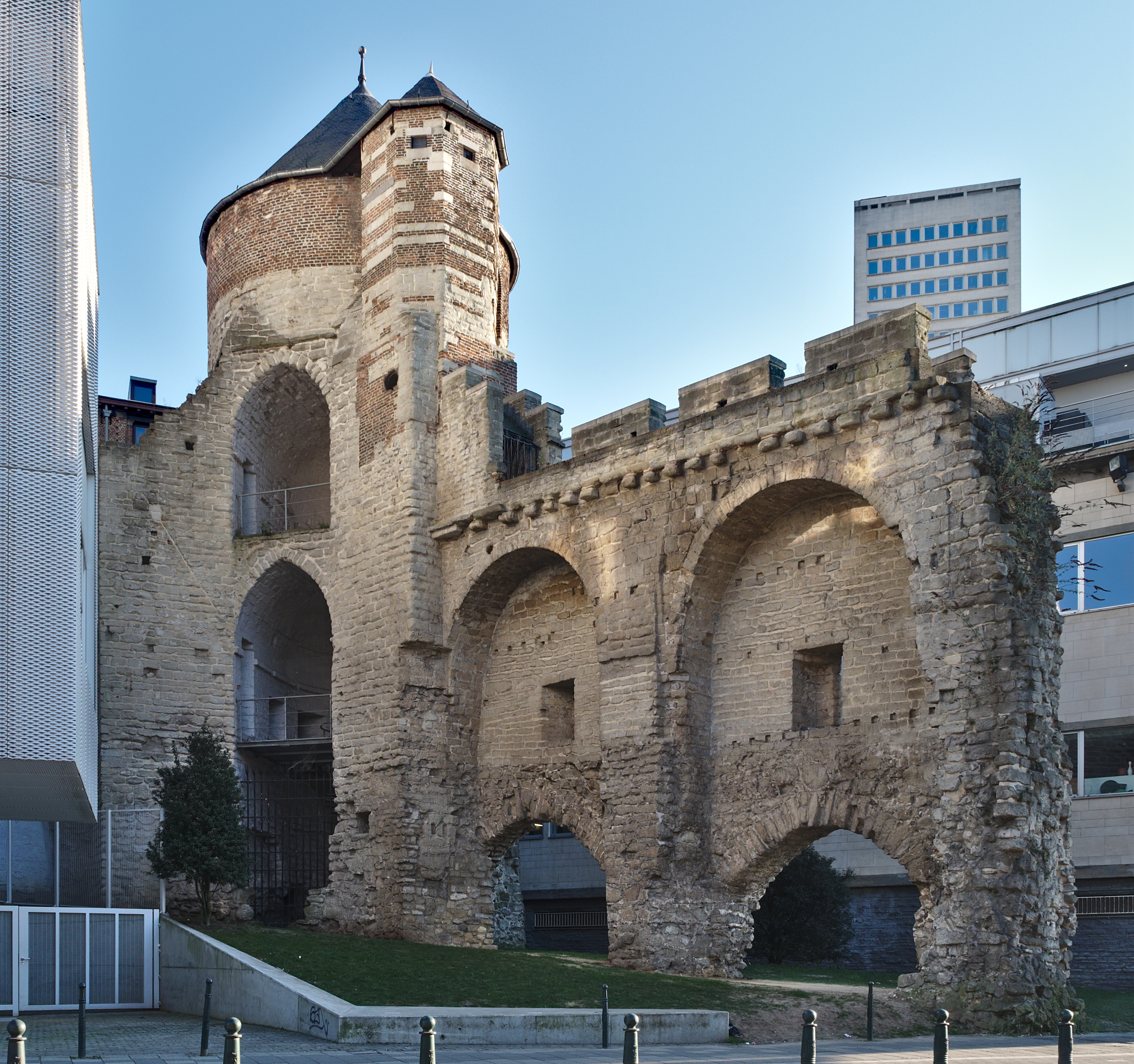
The Anneessens Tower or Angle Tower, inside view

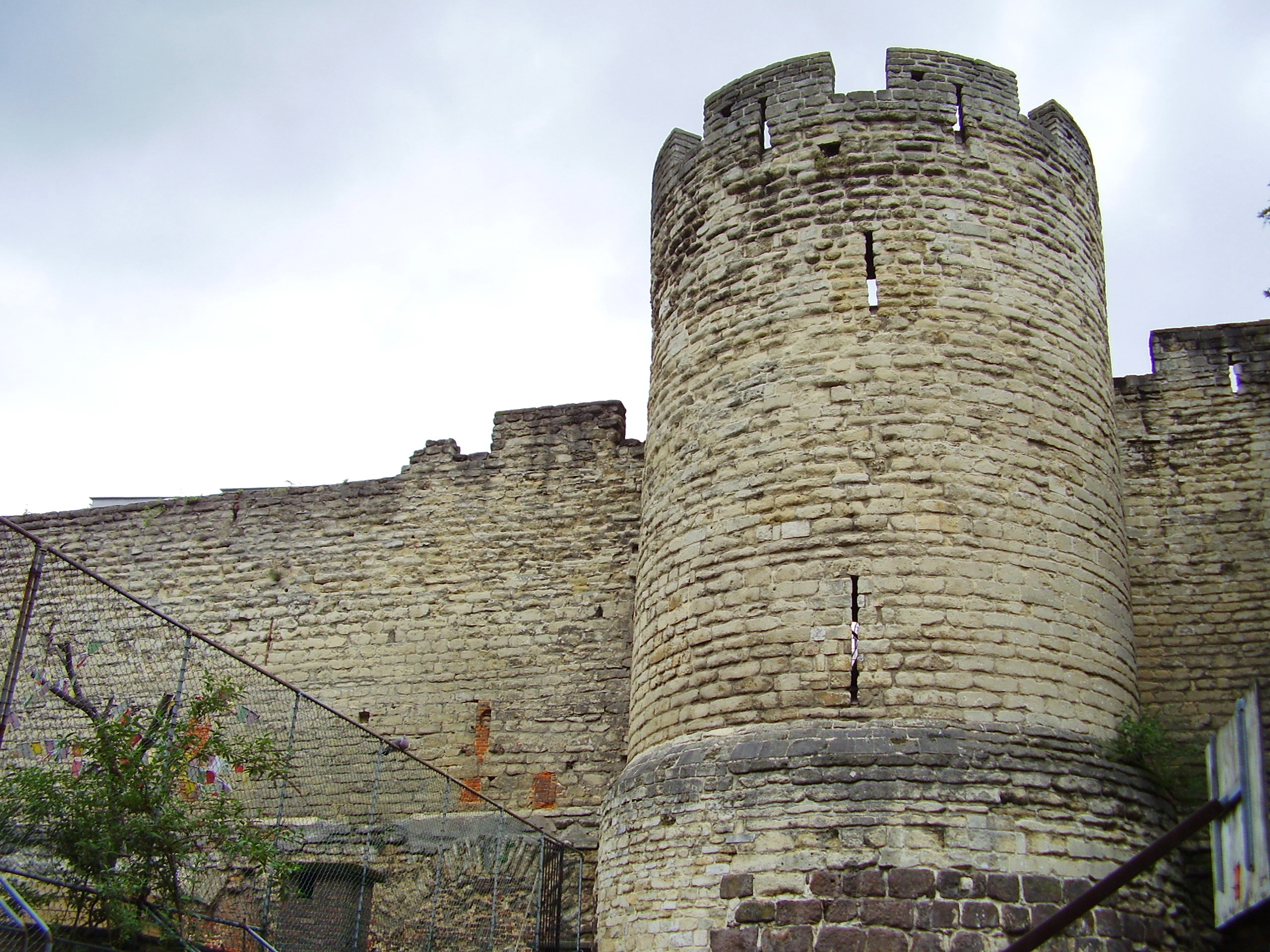
The St. James Tower, seen from outside the walls

=== Second walls ===
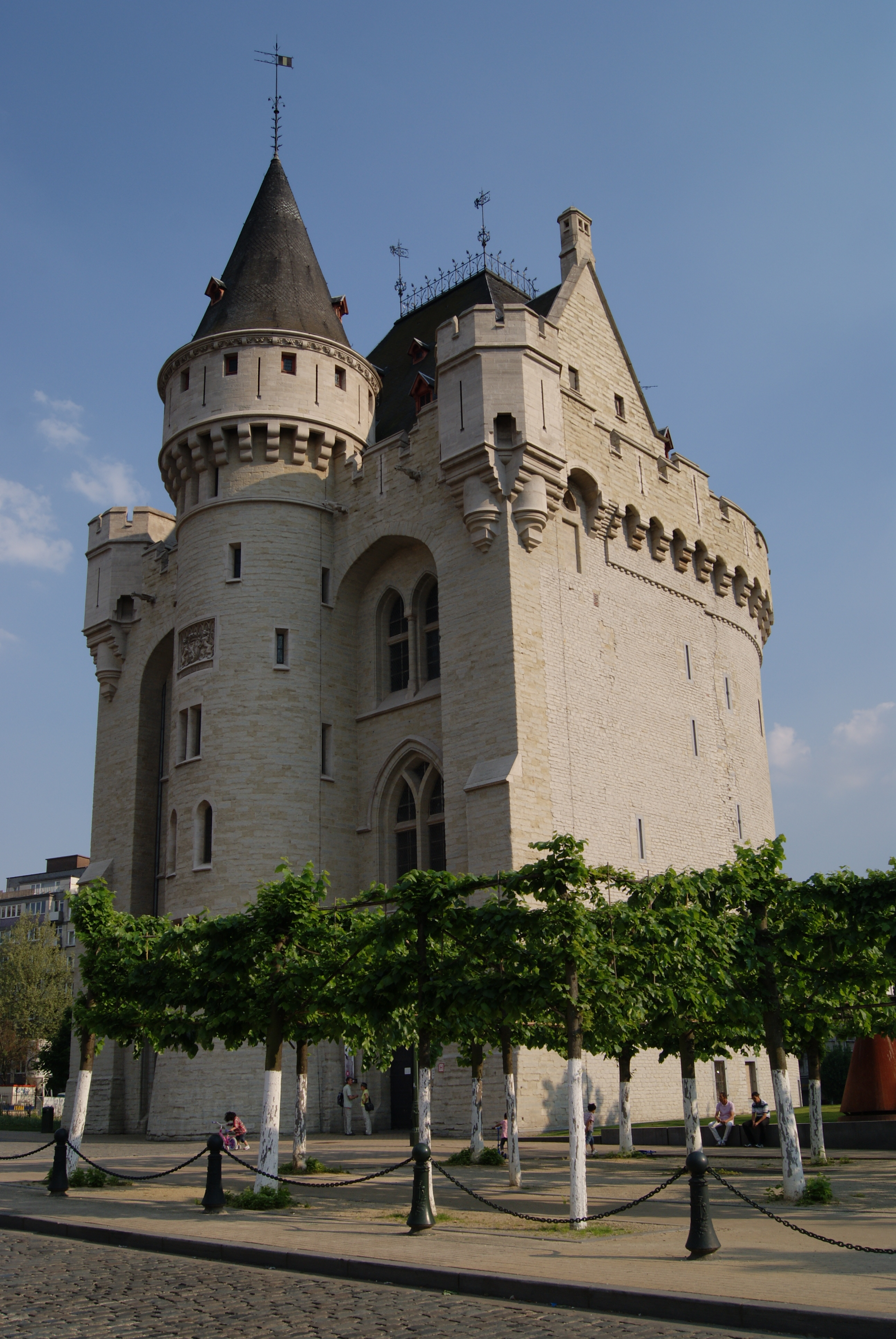
The Halle Gate in 2011

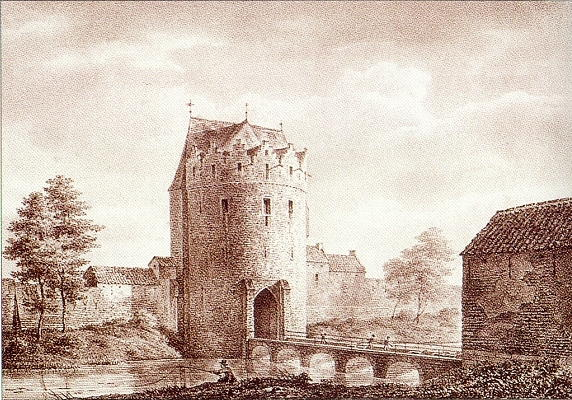
The Anderlecht Gate, c. 1780

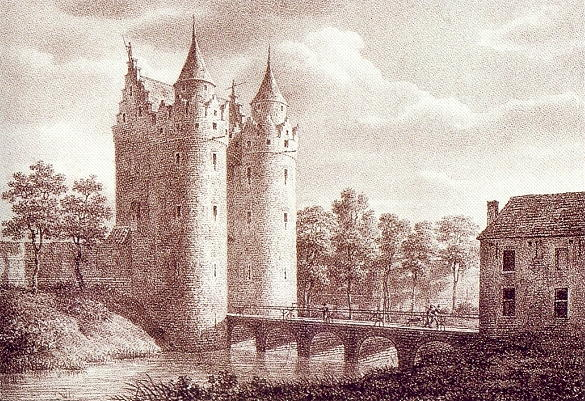
The Flanders Gate, c. 1780

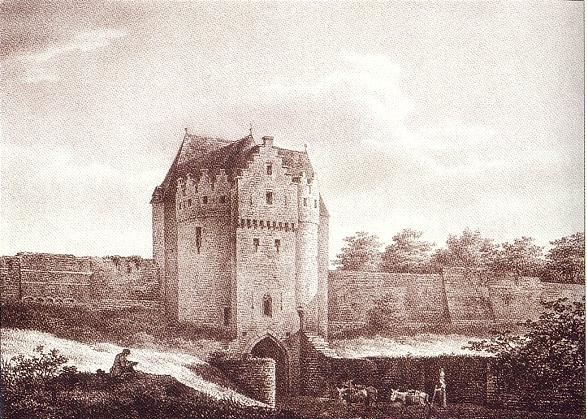
The Schaerbeek Gate, c. 1780

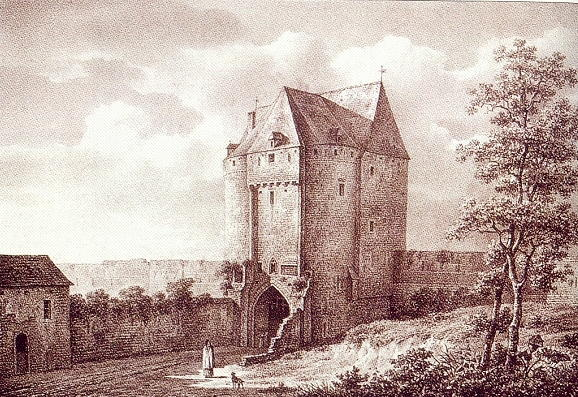
The Namur Gate, c. 1780

=== Octroi pavilions ===
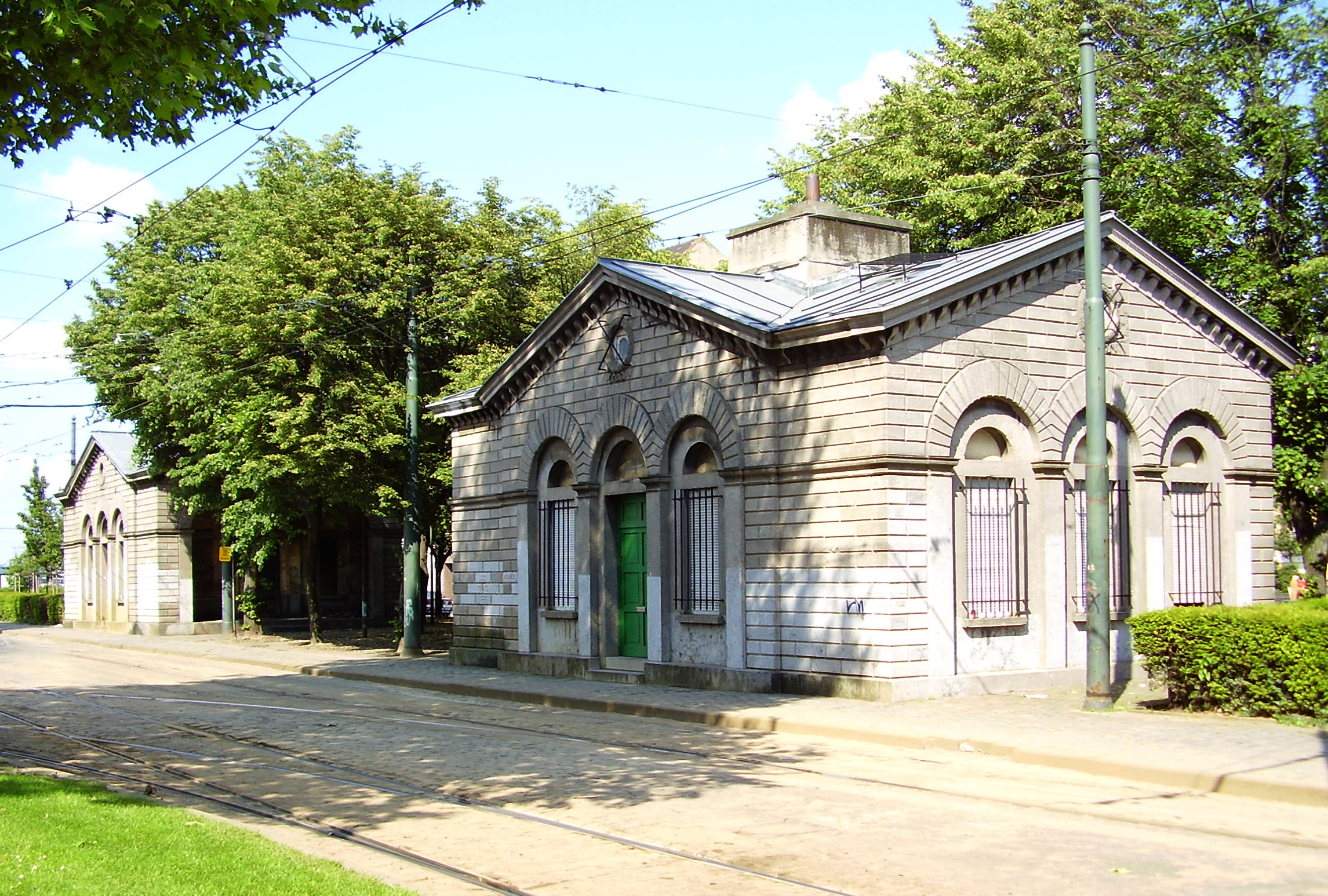
The former octroi pavilions of the Ninove Gate, at the Place de Ninove/Ninoofsplein

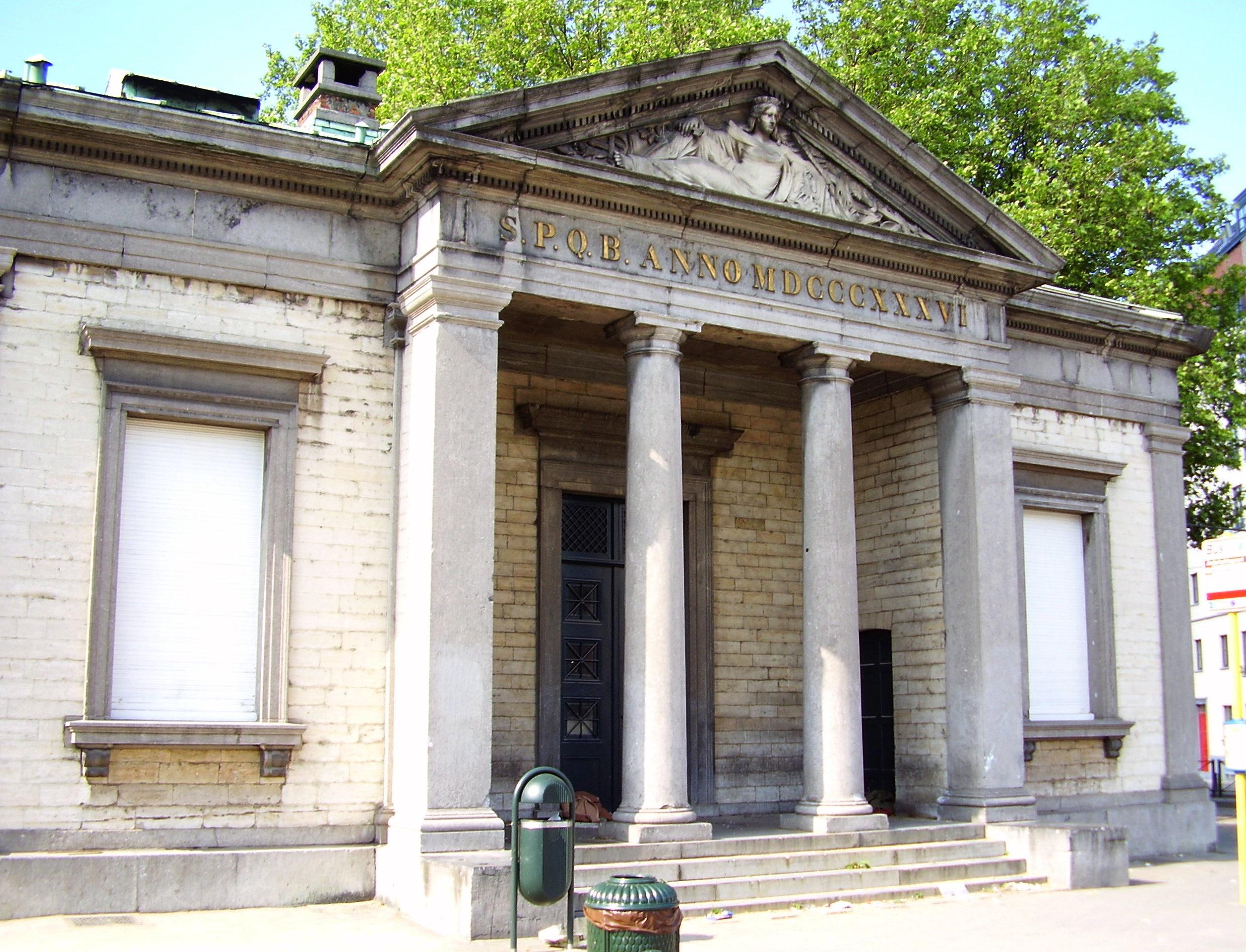
One of the two former octroi pavilions of the Anderlecht Gate

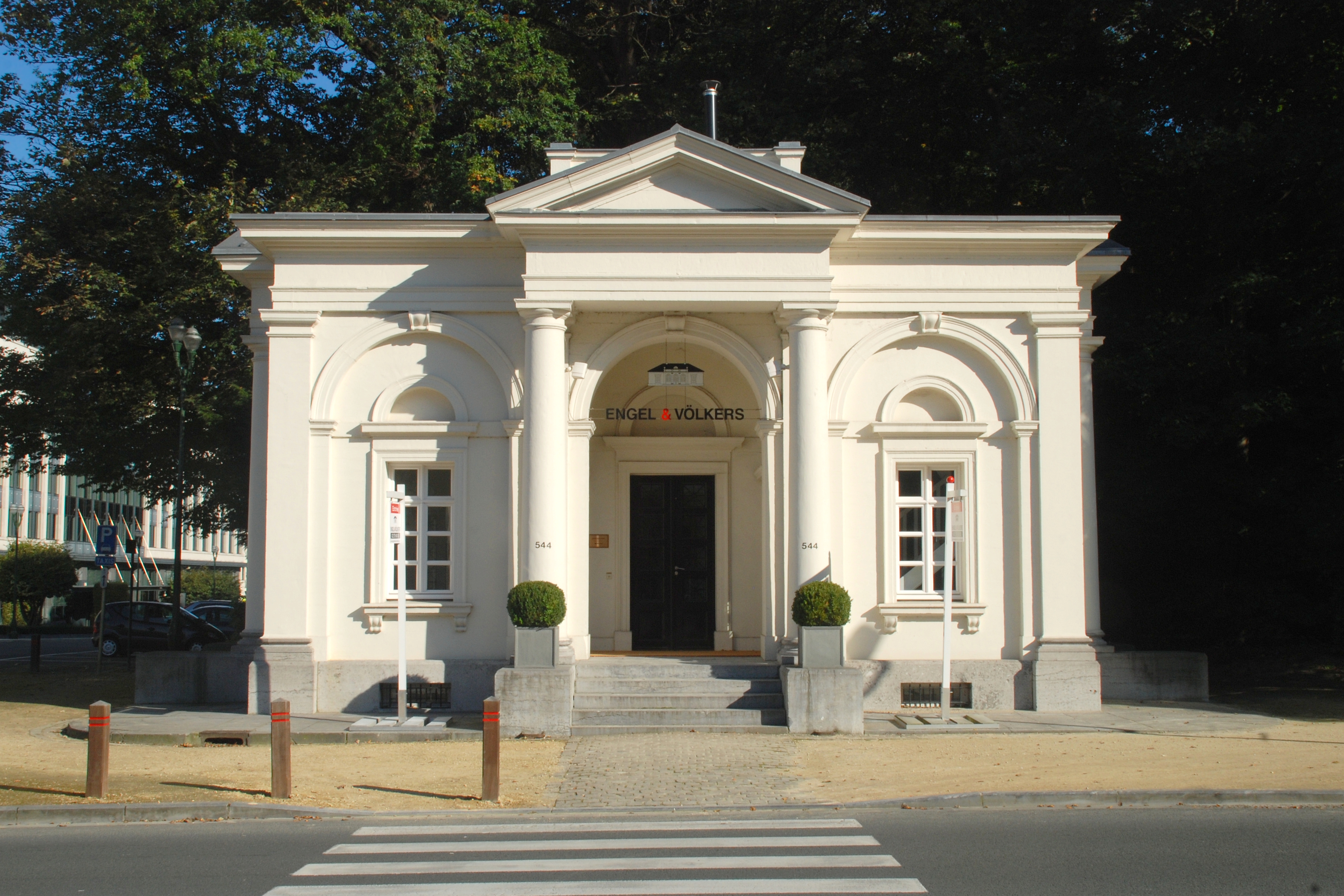
One of the two former octroi pavilions of the Namur Gate, now at the entrance of the Bois de la Cambre/Ter Kamerenbos

== See also ==
- Neoclassical architecture in Belgium
- History of Brussels
- Belgium in the long nineteenth century

== Further reading/guidebooks ==
- (in French) La Première Enceinte de Bruxelles, Corinne Licoppe (ed.), no. 29 in the series Bruxelles, Ville d'Art et d'Histoire, Ministère de la Région de Bruxelles-Capitale, Service des Monuments et Sites, 2001
- (in French) La Porte de Hal - Temoin silencieux d'une histoire tumultueuse, Linda Wullus, Musées Royaux d'Art et d'Histoire, 2006
