= Halle Gate =

Former city gate and current museum in Brussels, Belgium

- Porte de Hal (French); Hallepoort (Dutch)
- Part of the second city walls of Brussels
- Brussels, Belgium
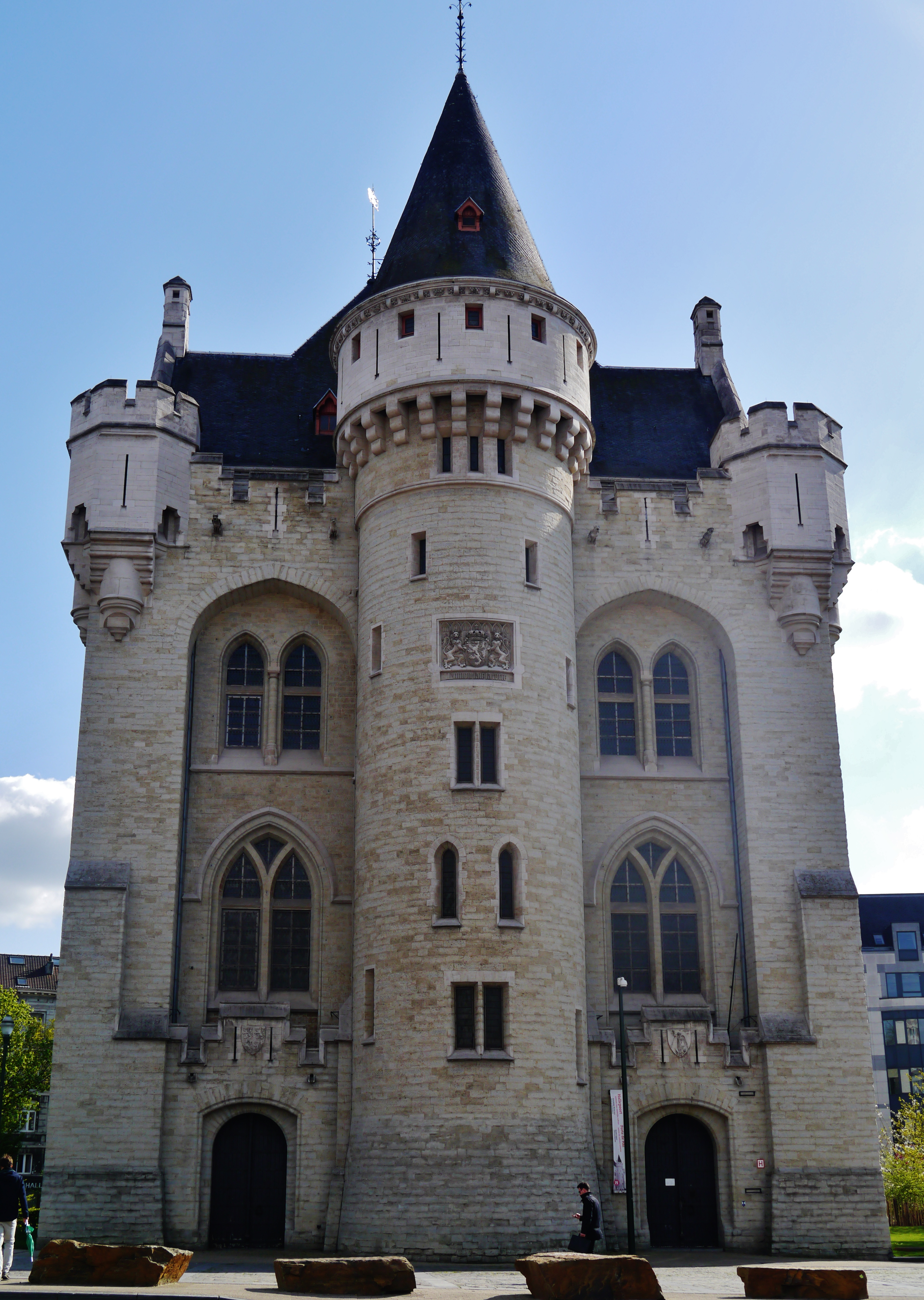
- The Halle Gate

Site information
- Type: City gate
- Controlled by: Royal Museums of Art and History
- Open to the public: Yes
- Website: www.hallegatemuseum.be/en

Location
- Location within Brussels
- Location within Brussels Location within Belgium
- Coordinates: 50°49′59″N 4°20′41″E

Site history
- Built: 1381
- Materials: Stone

The Halle Gate (French: Porte de Hal, pronounced [pɔʁt də al]; Dutch: Hallepoort; Brusselian: Allepout) is a former medieval city gate and the last vestige of the second walls of Brussels, Belgium. Built in the 14th century, it was heavily restored in the 19th century in its current neo-Gothic style by the architect Henri Beyaert. It is now a museum dedicated to the medieval City of Brussels, part of the Royal Museums of Art and History (RMAH).

The Halle Gate is located on Boulevard du Midi/Zuidlaan, just south of the Marolles/Marollen neighbourhood, between the City of Brussels and Saint-Gilles municipalities.

== History ==
=== Medieval structure ===
Built between 1381 and 1383, the Halle Gate was one of the seven city gates of the second set of defensive walls that enclosed Brussels, and its only remaining trace. It first bore the name of Obbrussel Gate (Old Dutch: Obbrusselsche, for "Upper Brussels", now Saint-Gilles). The gate was renamed for the city of Halle (French: Hal), now located in Flemish Brabant, to which the road led. The original gate included a portcullis and drawbridge over a moat. Though their military function ended in 1564, these features are visible to this day.

In the 16th and 17th centuries, new siege weapons and techniques, including the advent of artillery, forced the city to modernise the defences in order to keep potential attackers at a safe distance from the walls, including the addition of ditches, bastions and ravelins. The gate's defence was reinforced around 1675 by the Fort of Monterey, the Fort of Saint Clara and the Castel Rodrigo. The former was the most important defensive work, its name coming from the Spanish count responsible for modernising the defences. It was built between 1672 and 1675 on the heights of Obbrussel, south of the Halle Gate, by the military engineers Merex and Blom.

As with the rest of the city's fortifications, the Halle Gate and the Fort of Monterey were ineffective, and were not able to prevent the French bombardment of Brussels in 1695, from the heights of Scheut, in Anderlecht, as part of the War of the Grand Alliance. The defensive works proved equally ineffective when French troops seized the city in 1746 during the War of the Austrian Succession, leaving the defensive works in ruins. By that time, siege was no longer an important part of warfare. Due to the growth of commerce and improved roads, the fortifications did little more than frustrate transit into and out of the city.

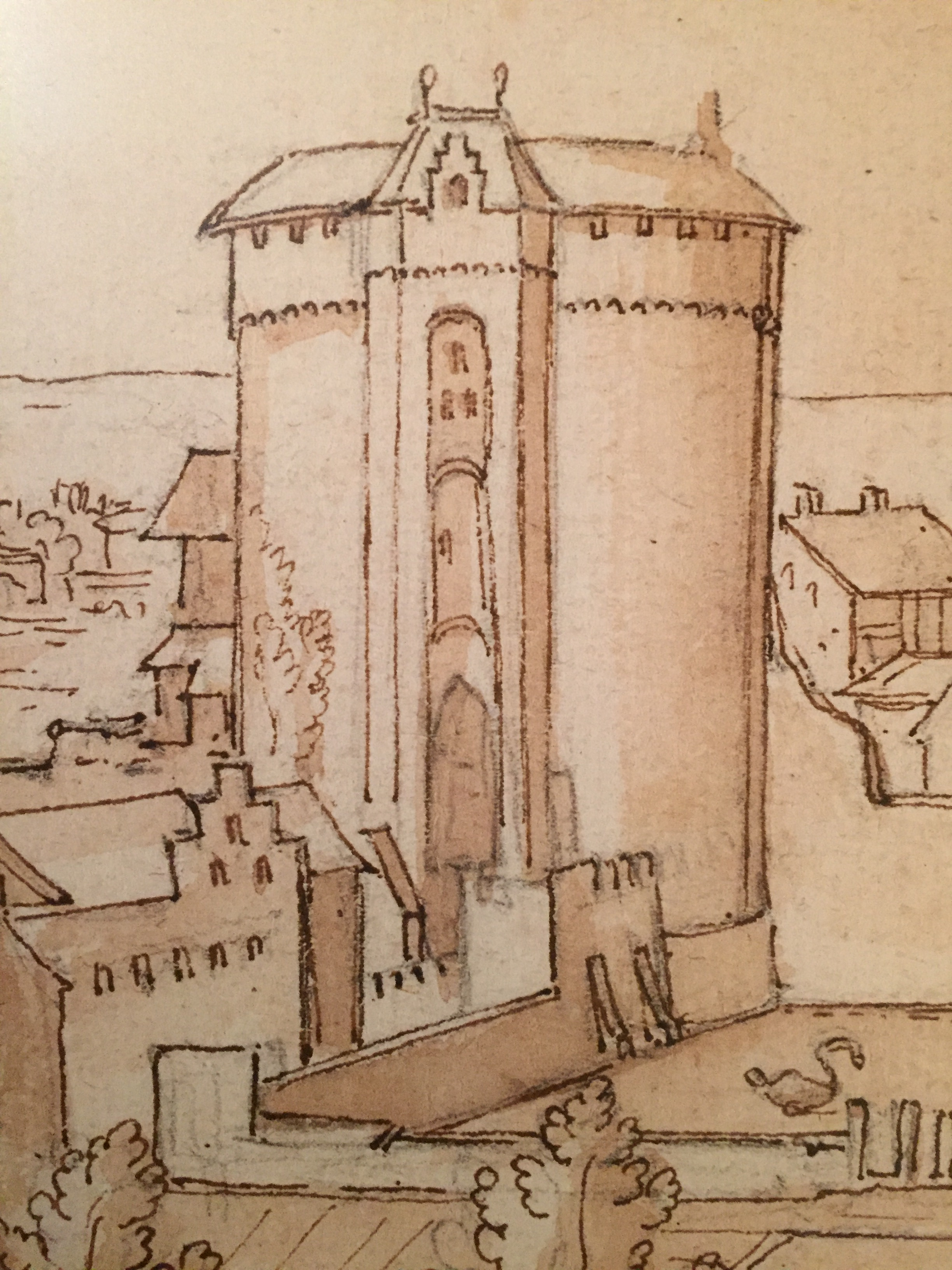
The Halle Gate c. 1612, detail of a drawing by Remigio Cantagallina

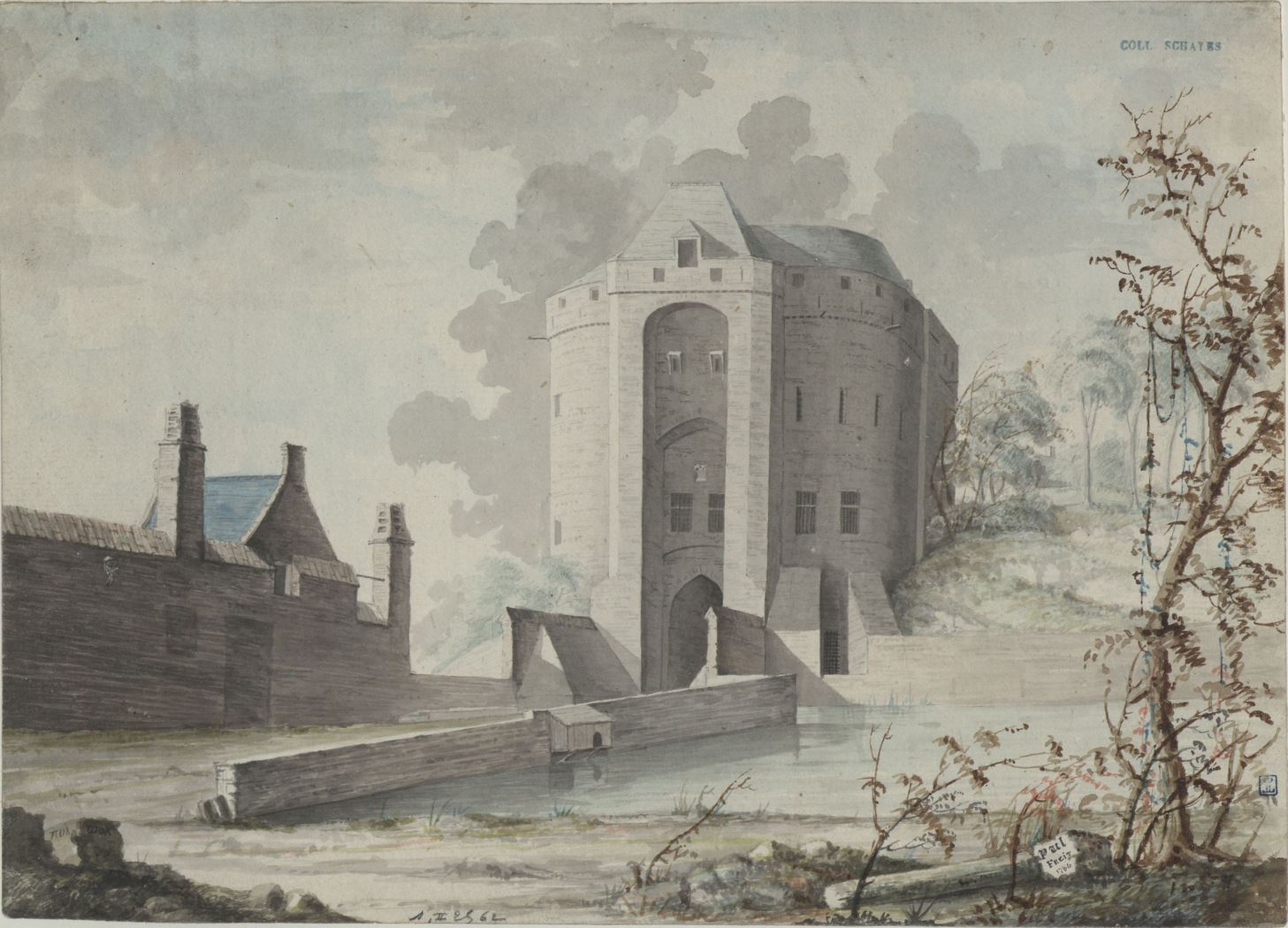
The Halle Gate in 1786, watercolour painting by Paul Vitzthumb

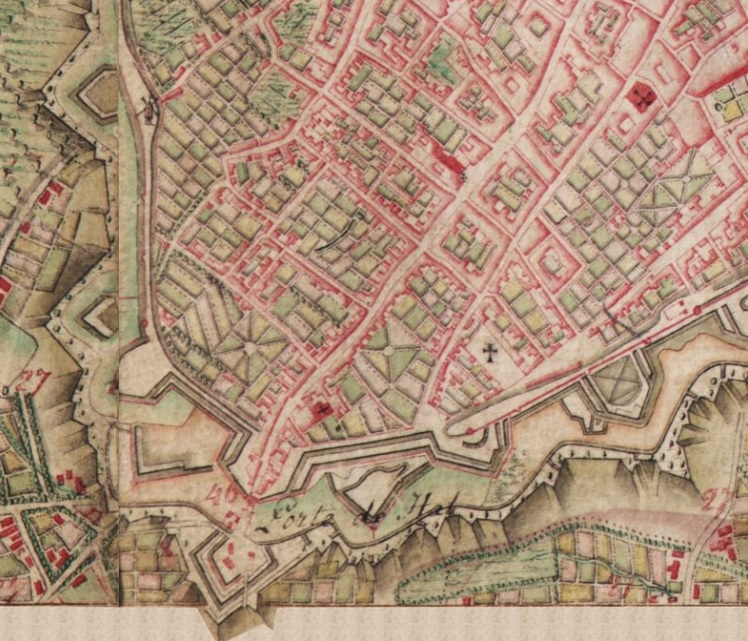
The Halle Gate marked on the 18th-century Ferraris map

=== 19th-century restoration ===
While the other six gateways and the defensive walls were demolished between 1818 and 1840 to make way for the Small Ring (Brussels' inner ring road), the Halle Gate survived as it then served as a military prison. It was at other times used as a customs house, a granary, and a Lutheran church. In 1830, as Belgium gained its independence, demolition work had reached the gate, but the new government decided to spare it. In 1840, the street just inside of it was raised 3 metres (10 ft), making it impassable to vehicles. An octroi was nonetheless still levied on commercial goods passing there until this practice was abolished in 1860.

From 1868 to 1871, as the city was being modernised, the architect Henri Beyaert, with little regard for historical accuracy, transformed the austere medieval tower into something of a neo-Gothic castle, which fit better with the contemporary romantic perception of the Middle Ages. The outer entrance, now facing Saint-Gilles, is closer to the original appearance. In front of the inner gate, facing the City of Brussels, Beyaert added a circular tower topped by a large conical roof, containing a monumental spiral staircase. The old, rectangular windows were replaced by ogival ones. Beyaert also added turrets, a walkway and new battlements.

In 1847, the Halle Gate was included in Belgium's Musée royal d'Armures, d'Antiquités et d'Ethnologie ("Royal Museum of Armour, Antiquities and Ethnology"), now named the Royal Museums of Art and History (RMAH). The collections included diplomatic gifts, mementoes and curiosa owned by the Dukes of Burgundy and subsequently the Habsburg archdukes, and which had been placed, until then, in various locations in Brussels. By 1889, the Halle Gate had become too small to house most of the collections, which were relocated to the Cinquantenaire/Jubelpark Museum. The gate continues to display armour and weapons.

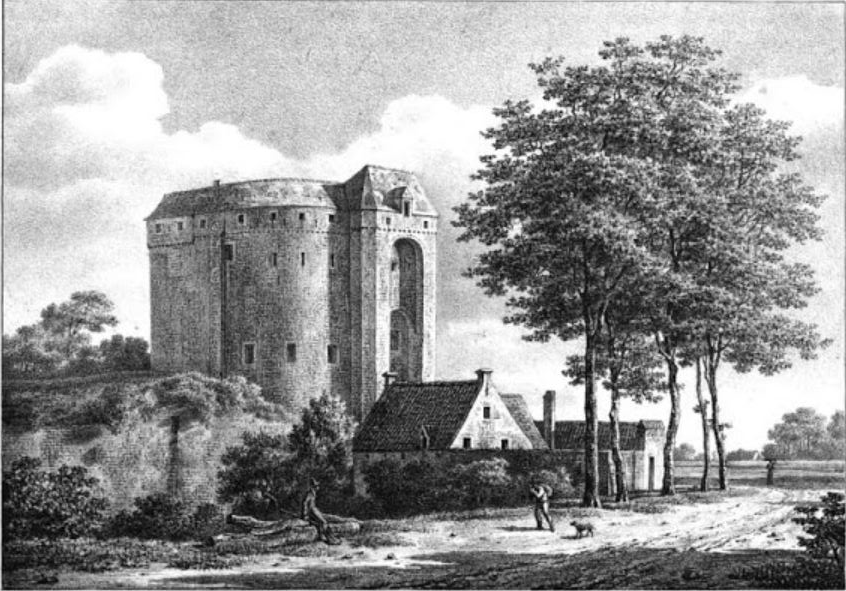
The Halle Gate before 1823, drawing by Vitzthumb from Collection des anciennes portes de Bruxelles

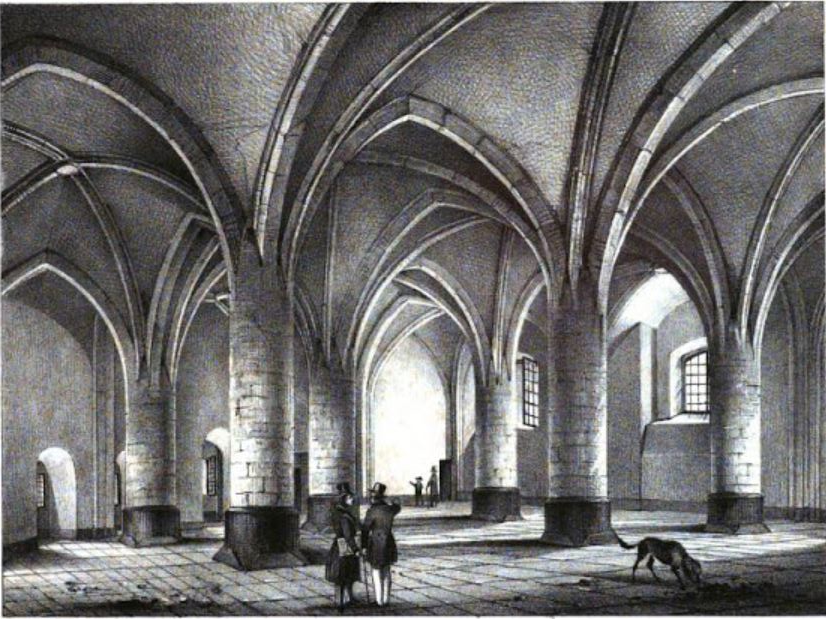
Interior of the Halle Gate before 1823, Vitzthumb, Collection des anciennes portes de Bruxelles

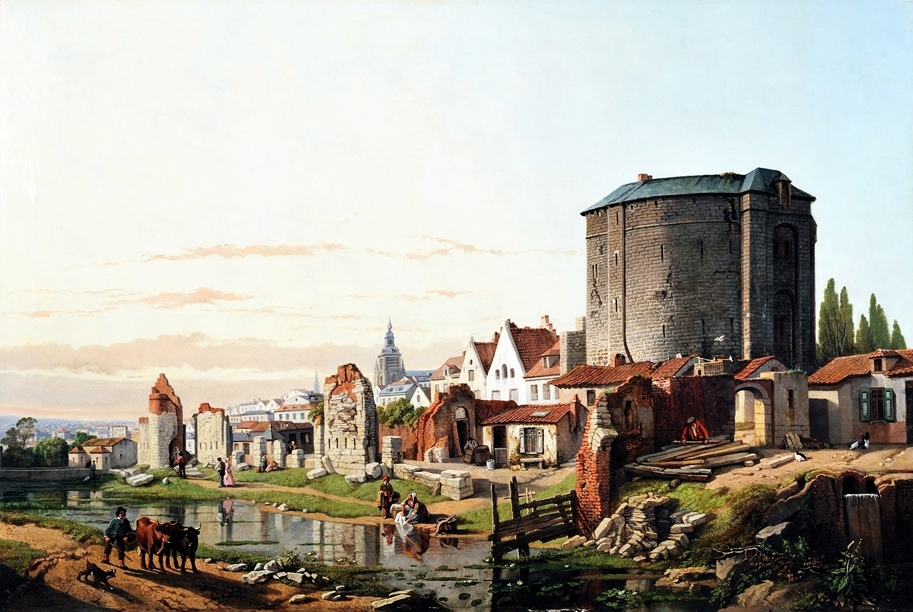
View of the remnants of Brussels' city walls near the Halle Gate in 1830–31, painting by François Bossuet

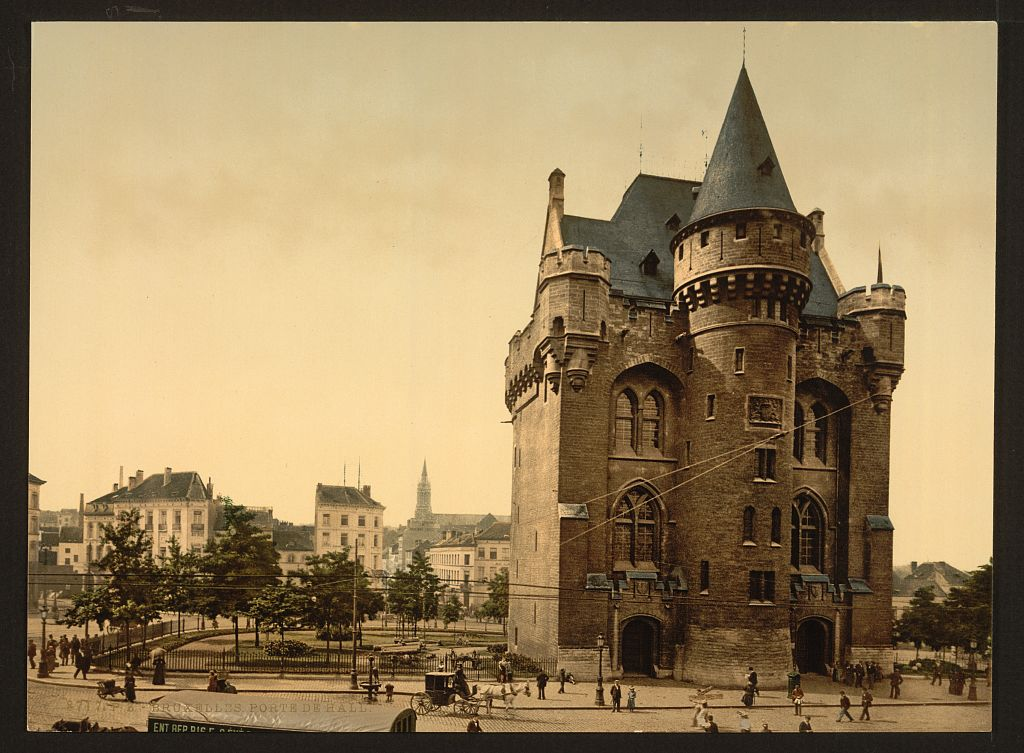
The Halle Gate in the late 19th century, after restoration

=== 20th century–present ===
In 1976, the Halle Gate was in a dangerous state of disrepair and was closed. The building received protected status on 13 September 1990. After a public competition, won by architect Marco Bollen, renovations began, and the building was reopened to the public in 1991. Further restoration was stalled due to lack of funds, and the museum only housed temporary exhibitions for several years. In March 2007, the second phase of the restoration began, and the completed museum finally opened on 6 June 2008, with the "Saint-Gilles" (drawbridge) entrance as the prestigious main entrance to the building.

Right next to the Halle Gate is the Porte de Hal/Hallepoort metro station, which opened in 1988, and the premetro (underground tram) station of the same name, which opened in 1993 (the metro operates one level below the premetro lines). The station contains several artworks by François Schuiten of metro trains and futuristic cityscapes, including some views of the medieval Halle Gate amongst skyscrapers.

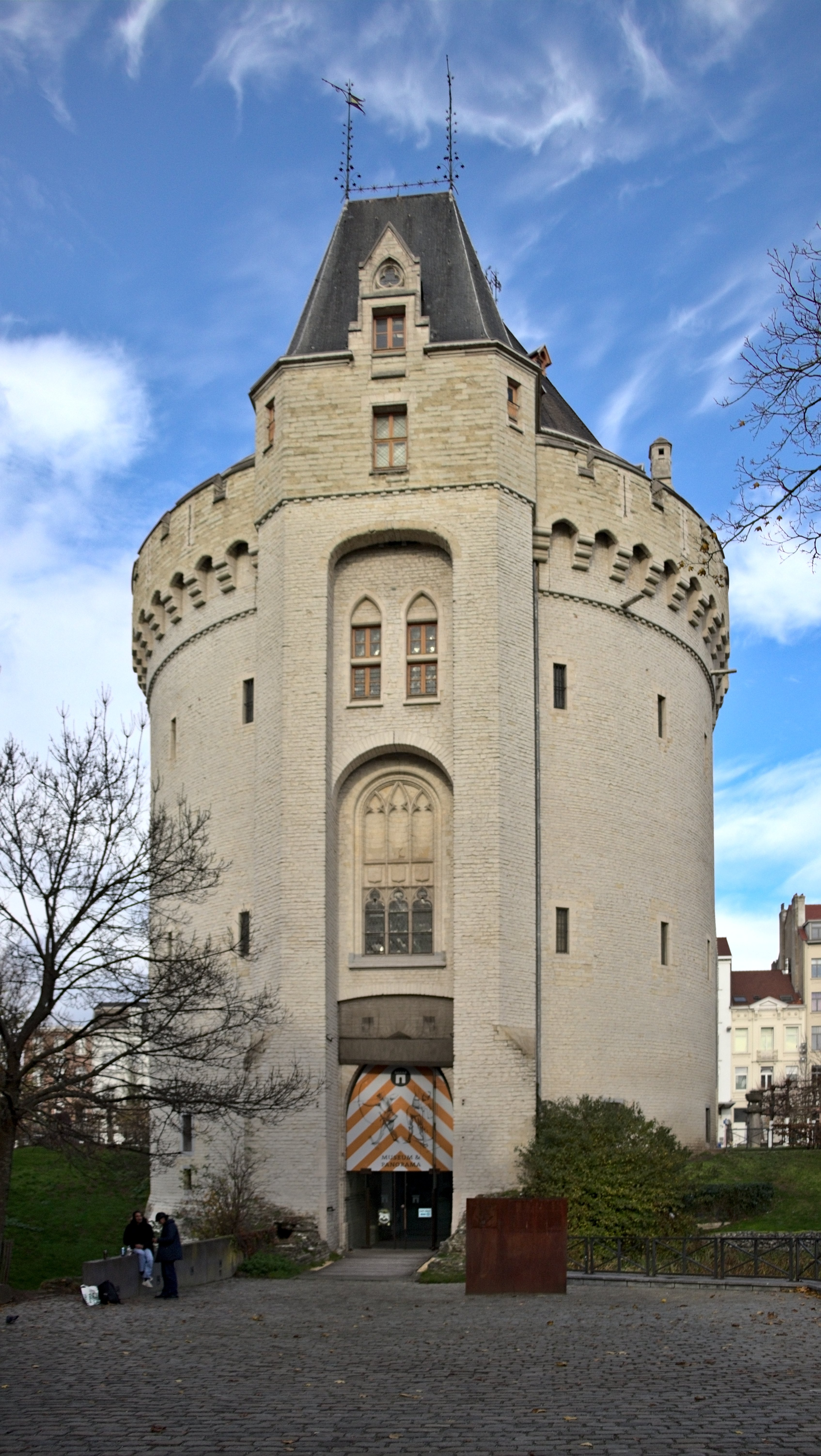
The Halle Gate in 2020, Saint-Gilles' side

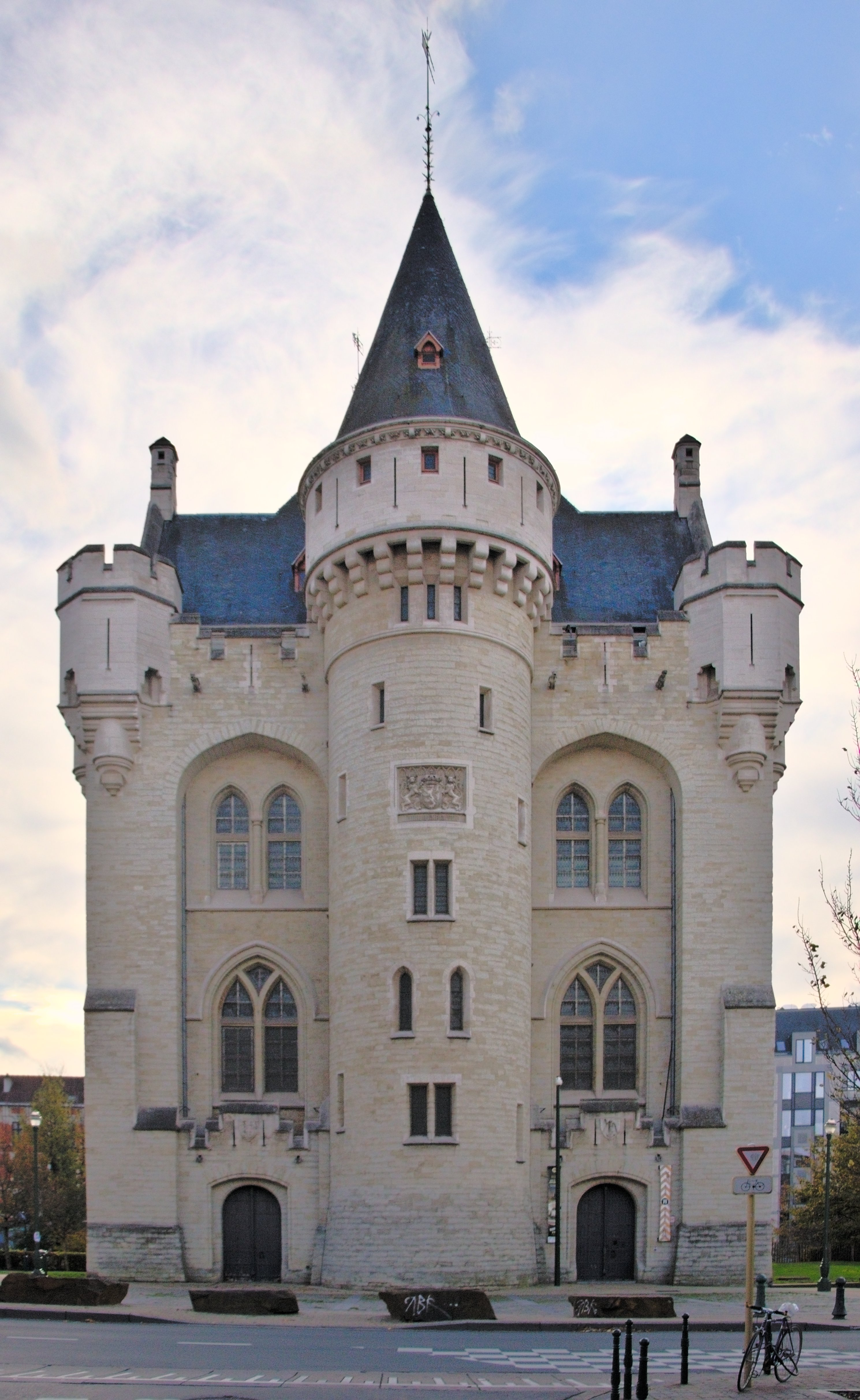
The Halle Gate in 2020, City of Brussels' side

== Museum ==
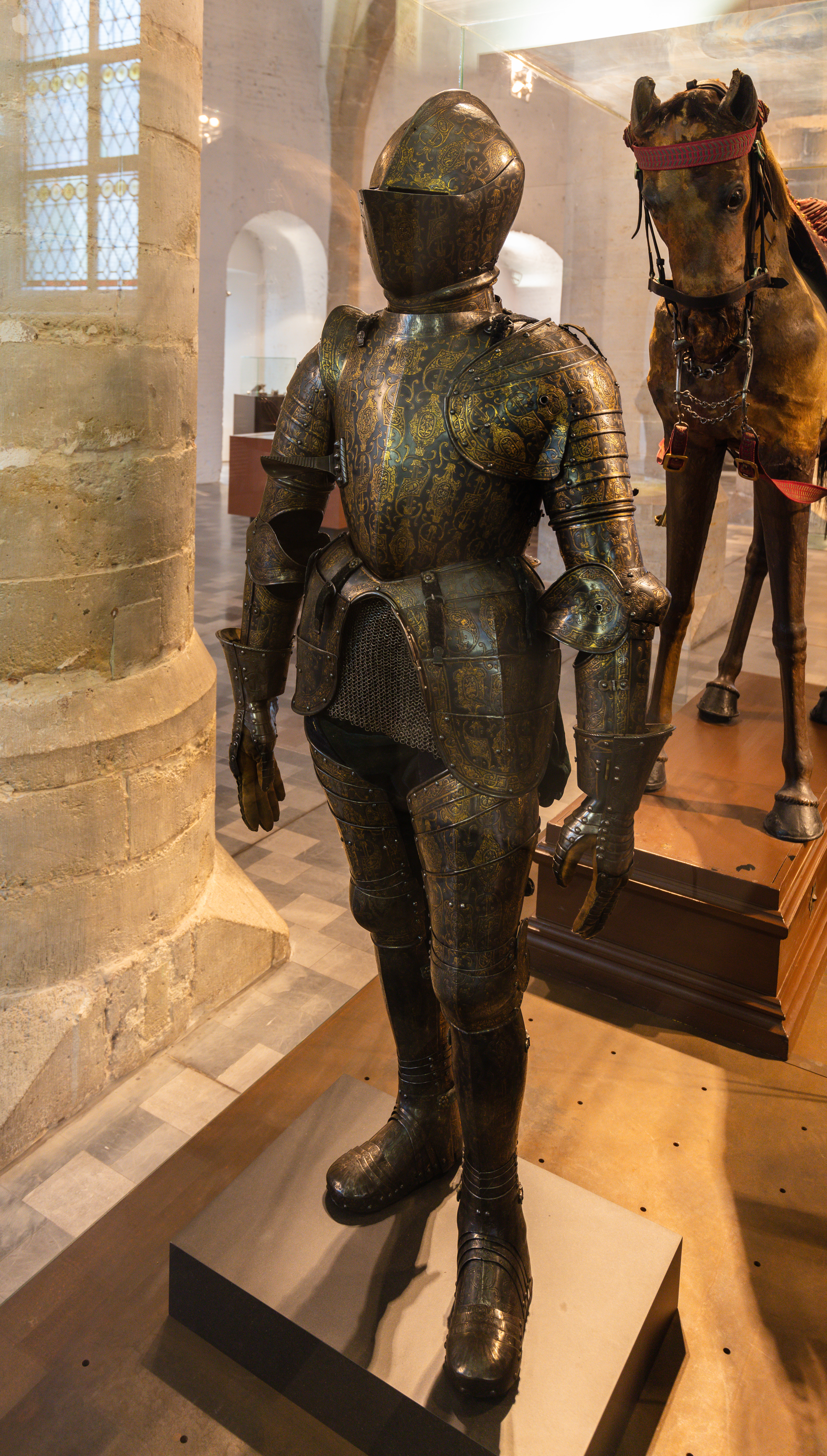
Parade armor of Archduke Albert of Austria

The museum displays exhibits about the history of the building, as well as of the City of Brussels and its defence. The collection includes the parade armor of Archduke Albert of Austria, Governor General of the Habsburg Netherlands in the 17th century. The main parts of the museum, each on a separate floor, are:

- Armour and Armaments, in a small room off the central passage
- the Gothic Room, above, containing the history of the fortifications of Brussels and of the Halle Gate
- the Guilds Room, showing the role of the trade guilds of the city
- a temporary exhibition space
- a walkway round the battlements, offering a panorama of the city
- the roof space for small exhibitions

== In art ==
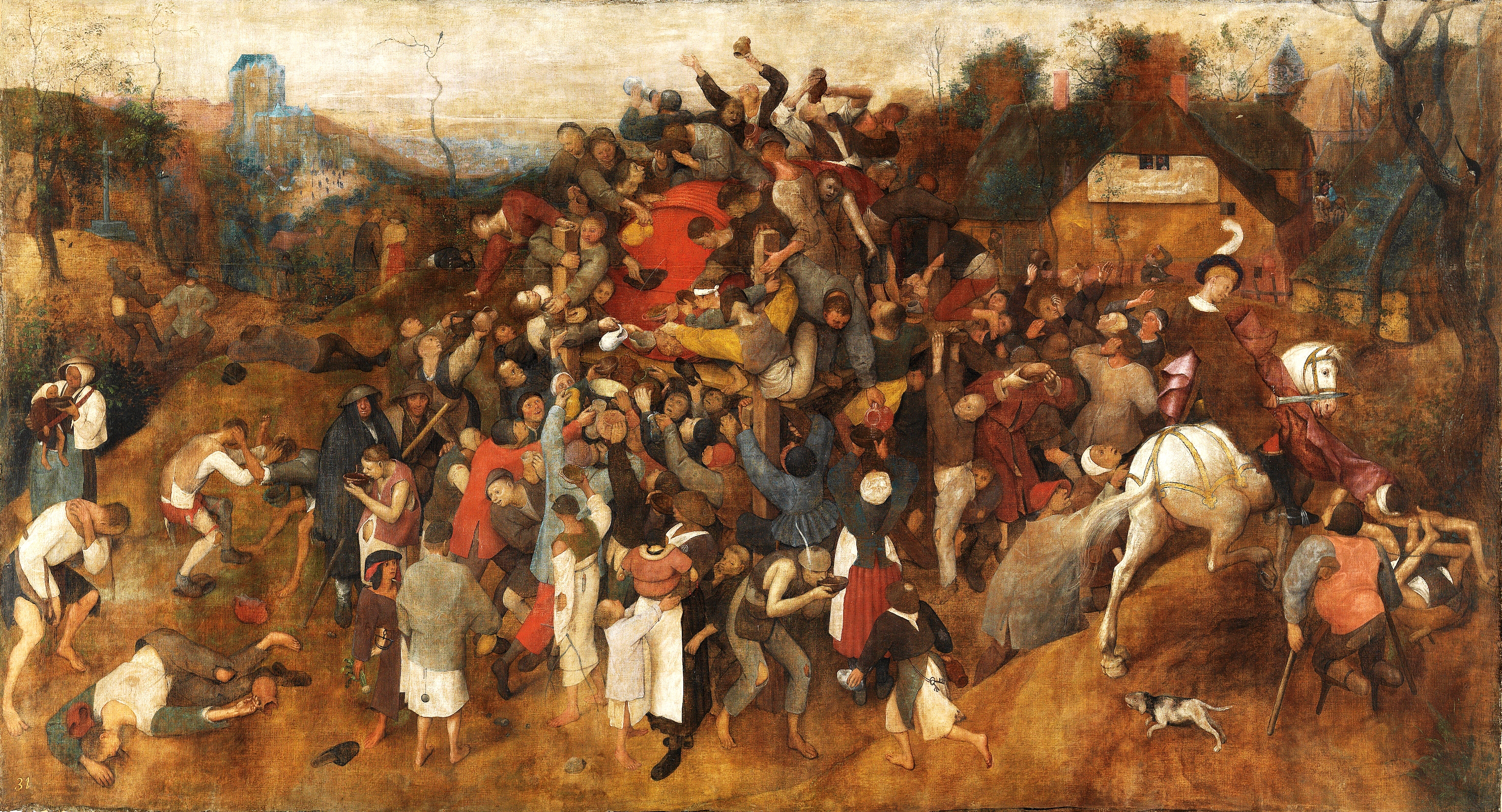
The Wine of Saint Martin's Day, Pieter Bruegel the Elder, c. 1565–1568

The Halle Gate was represented, around 1565–1568, by Pieter Bruegel the Elder in his painting The Wine of Saint Martin's Day. (Note: It is shown in the background in the upper-left corner.)

== See also ==
- Namur Gate, a part of the 14th-century city wall protecting Brussels
- List of museums in Brussels
- History of Brussels
- Belgium in the long nineteenth century
