= Leyniers family =

- New coat of arms
- Parent family: Seven Noble Houses of Brussels
- Country: Spanish Netherlands Austrian Netherlands; United Belgian States; Kingdom of France; French First Republic; First French Empire; United Kingdom of the Netherlands Kingdom of Belgium
- Place of origin: Duchy of Brabant Brussels
- Founded: 15th century
- Motto: DEO ET ARTE (God and Art)

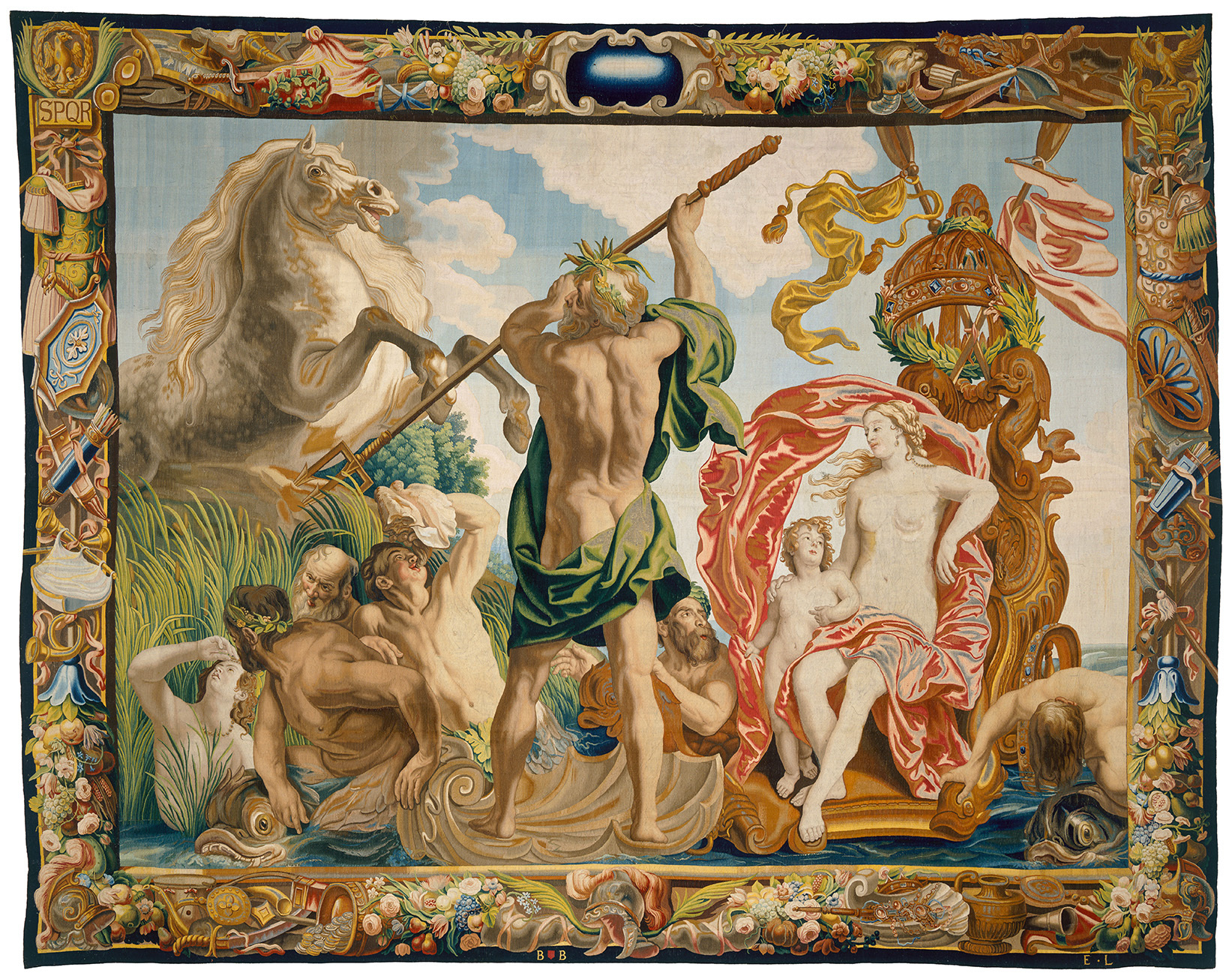
Tapestry by Évrard Leyniers, Neptune gives birth to the horse by striking the earth with his trident, after a work by Jacques Jordaens, circa 1650-1660.

The Leyniers family (/lɛnɪjɛ/) is a bourgeois family that appeared in Brussels in the 15th century and produced many high-level tapestry makers and dyers, experts in the art of dyeing in subtle shades the woolen threads destined for this trade.

Many members of this family also participated in the management of the city of Brussels and were part of the magistracy either in the Guilds or in the Seven Noble Houses.

== History ==
The members of the Leyniers family exercised their art of tapestry making until the last quarter of the eighteenth century and many museums in Europe and the rest of the world have tapestries from their workshops in their collections.

Several members were part of the Drapery Court of Brussels.

Daniel Leyniers was the last of this family to have exercised in this industry but despite all his efforts he was forced during the winter of 1767-1768 to definitively close his workshops. He then devoted himself to the manufacture of lace.

The Leyniers family who participated with honor in the Resistance paid a heavy tribute to the defense of the fatherland during the Second World War and was decimated by the German occupation, murdered in the concentration camps or by firing squads.

== Members ==
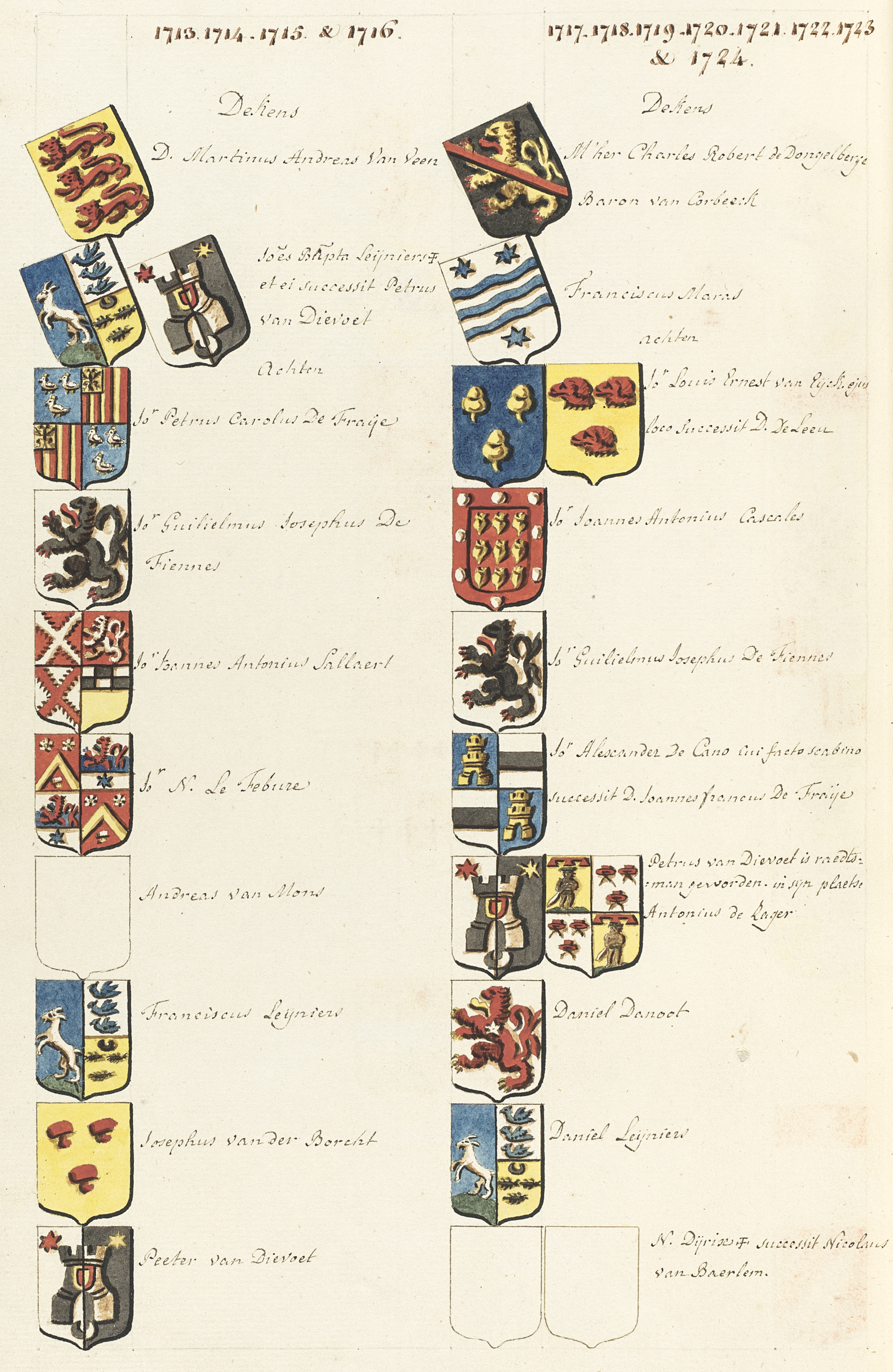
Several members were part of the Drapery Court of Brussels as seen on this roll of arms (1713-1724).

- Antoine Leyniers, tapestrymaker, was the nephew by marriage of Bernard van Orley, he had married Josine, the daughter of his half-brother Gommaire. His mark is a monogram consisting of the letters A and L. We find this mark on "The History of Romulus" which adorns the large hall of the Royal Museums of Fine Arts in Brussels.
- Charles-Marie-Joseph Leyniers (1756-1822) wine merchant, living on St. Catherine Street, is one of the volunteers who joined the five Serments of the city in 1787, who, following Henri van der Noot, armed themselves against the Imperials during the Brabant Revolution : he was a volunteer of the Fencers, aggregated with the Serment of Saint-Michel. He was a Freemason, a member of the Lodge of True Friends of the Union, in Brussels, he married in the collegiate church Saints-Michel-et-Gudule on 6 November 1780, Marie-Elisabeth van Dievoet (1752-1828).
- Daniel Leyniers, admitted in 1769 to the Caudenbergh lineage of the Seven Noble Houses of Brussels.
- Daniel Alphonse Charles Raymond Leyniers, born in Molenbeek-Saint-Jean on 15 March 1881, died in Brussels on 26 February 1957, Belgian politician, member of the Catholic Party, minister and bibliophile. He was owner of Fanson Castle in Xhoris, Ferrières, Liège Province. He had married one of the daughters of Minister Devolder, vice-governor of the Societe Generale de Belgique.
- Pierre Joseph Célestin François (1759-1851), painter, husband of Marie-Françoise Leyniers.
- Marc Leyniers, engineer at Sofina then printer in Brussels, born on 25 April 1887, resistant, died in deportation for the Fatherland in Lübeck (Germany). He is the direct descendant of the painter Seger Jacobus van Helmont whose daughter Anne Catherine Jeanne van Helmont had married Henri Francois Joseph Leyniers. And his two sons:
- Evrard Jacques Adolphe Leyniers, born on 11 June 1905 in Forest, resistant, died at the Bergen-Belsen camp, died for Belgium.
- Jean Auguste Daniel Leyniers, born on 21 June 1909, resistant, shot by the Germans in the Tir national of Brussels, died for Belgium on 17 February 1944.

== A few tapestries by members of the family ==
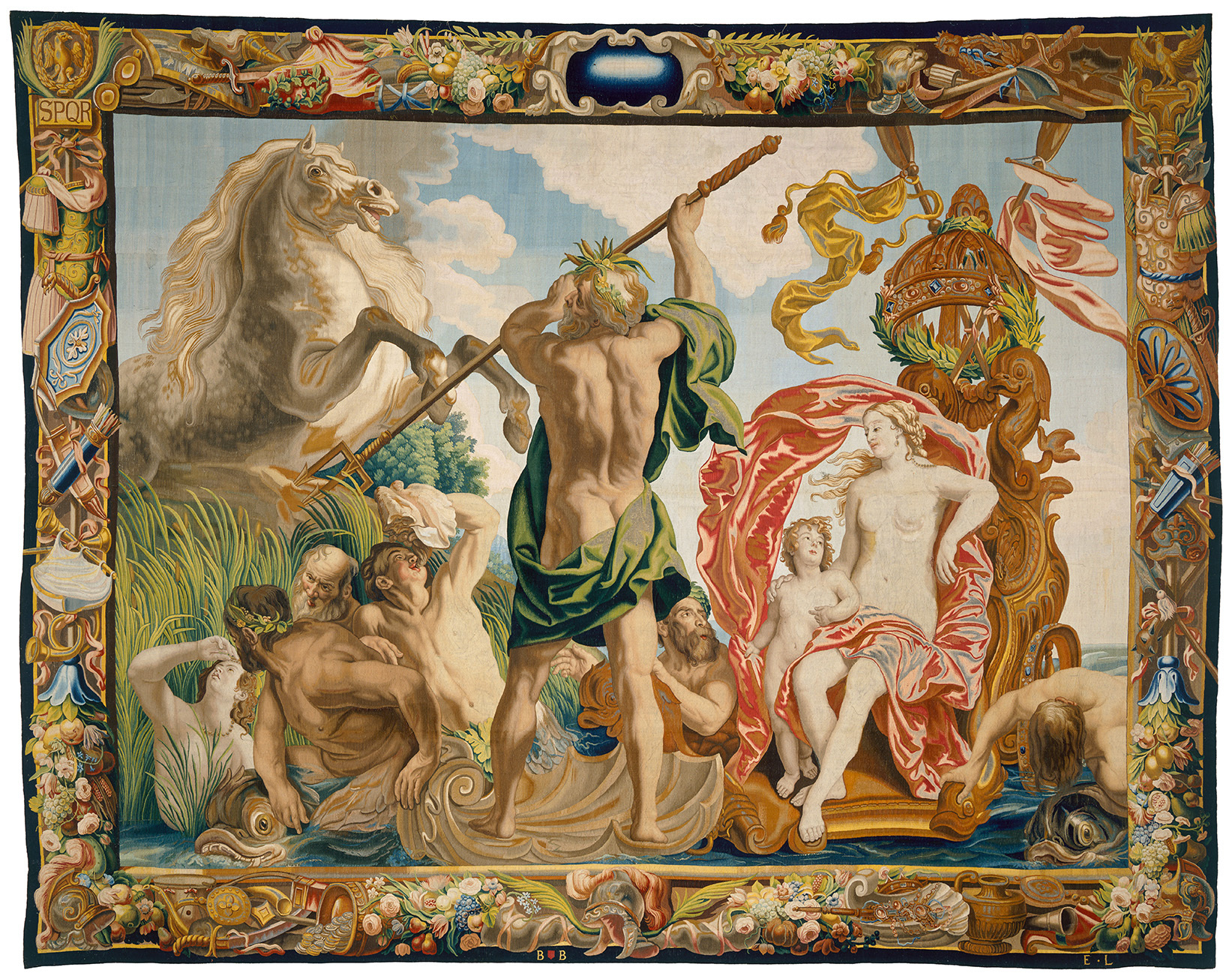

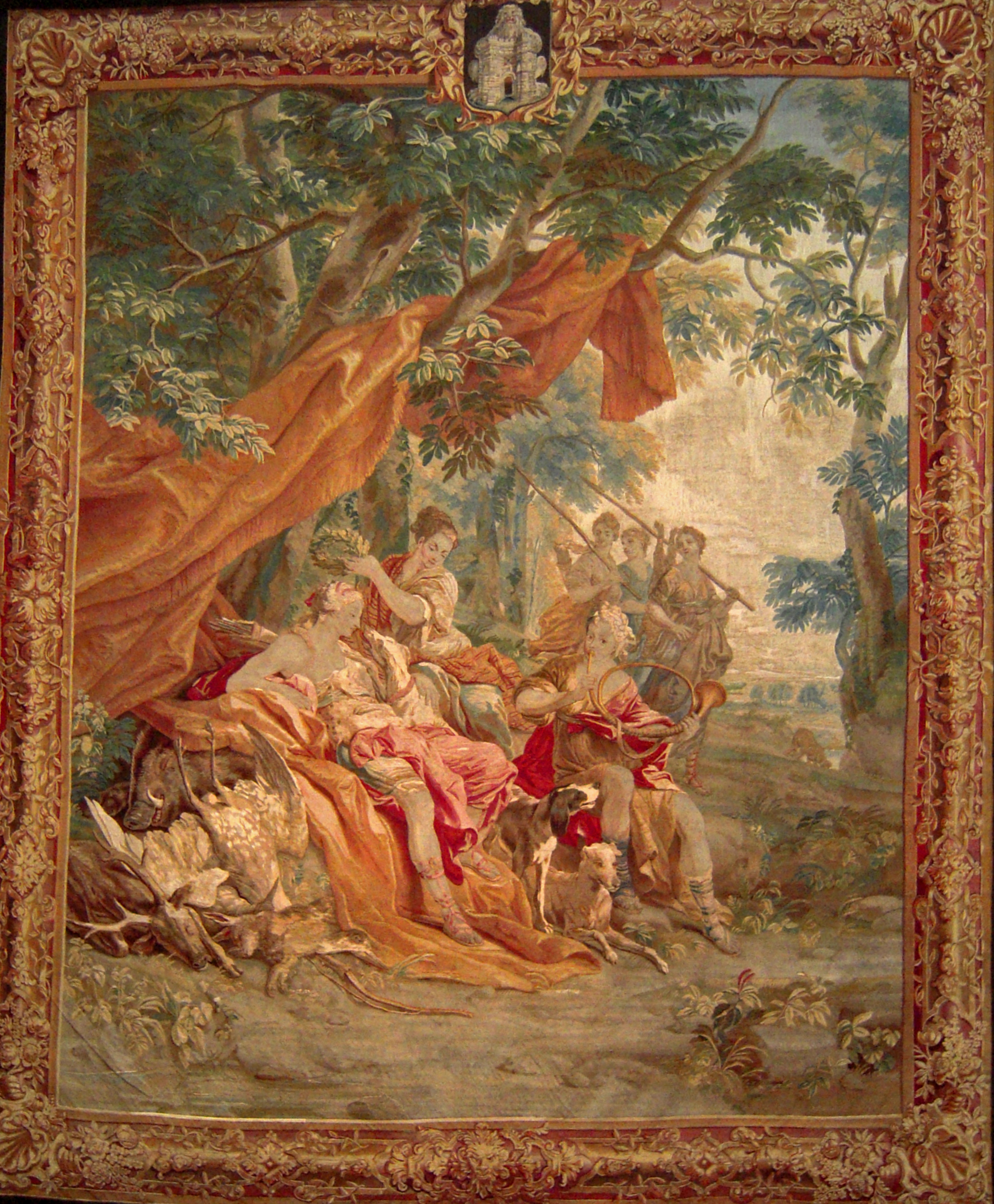

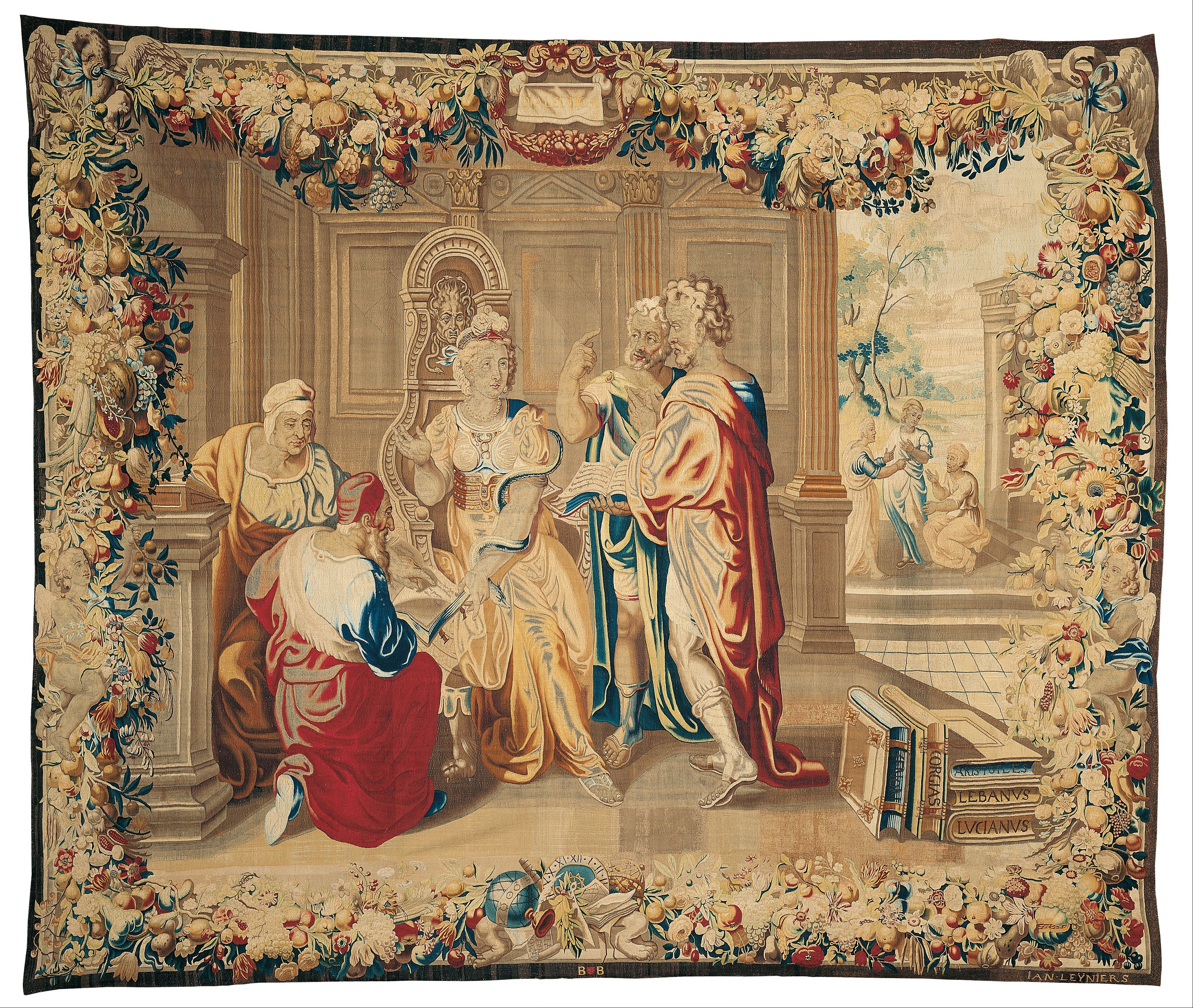

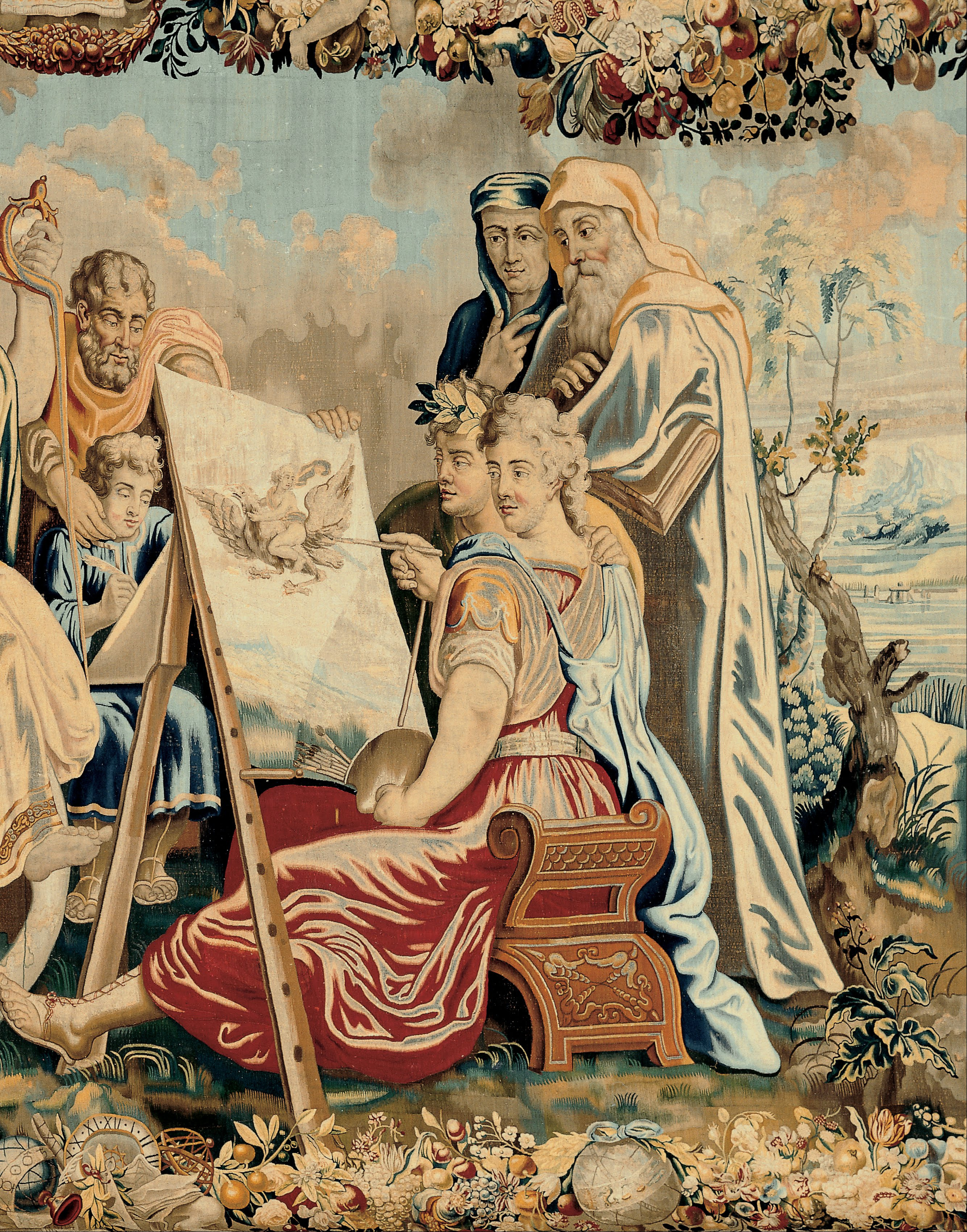

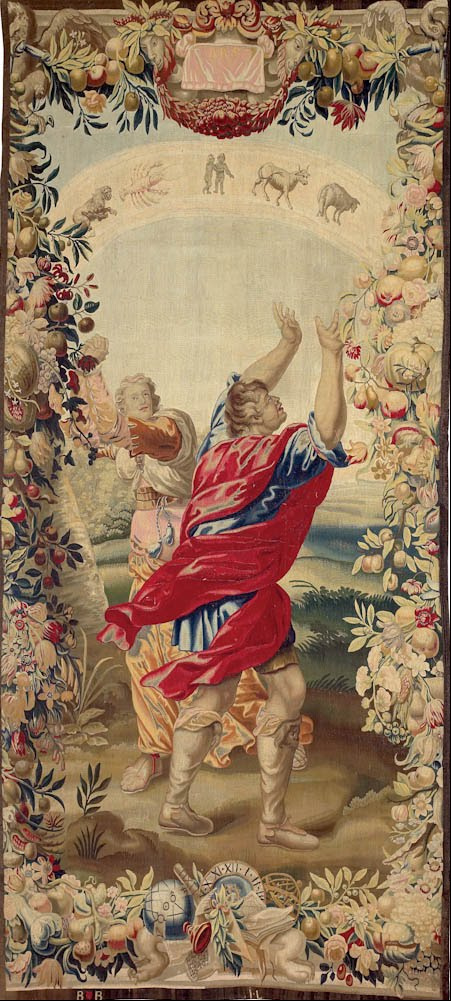

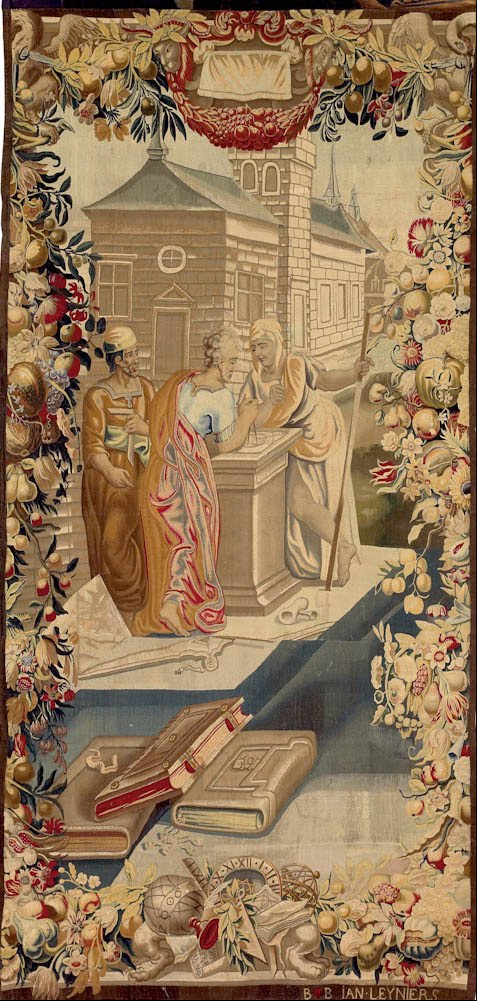

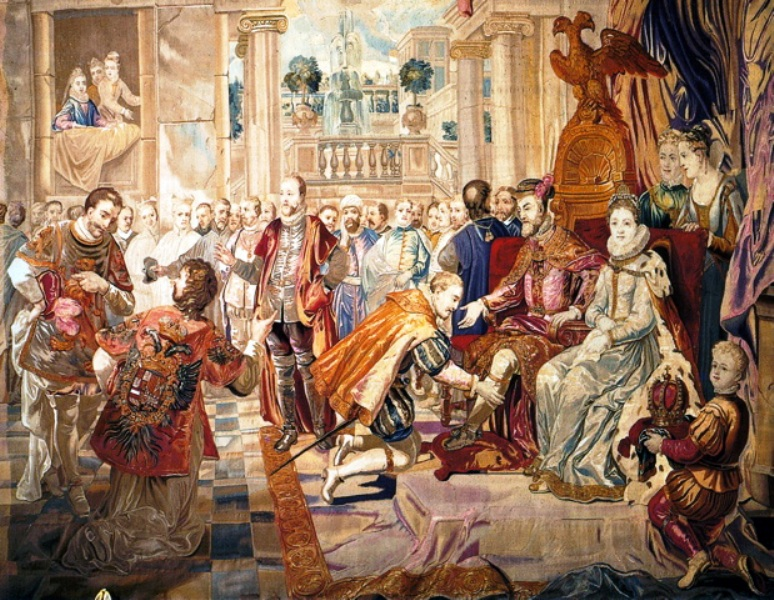

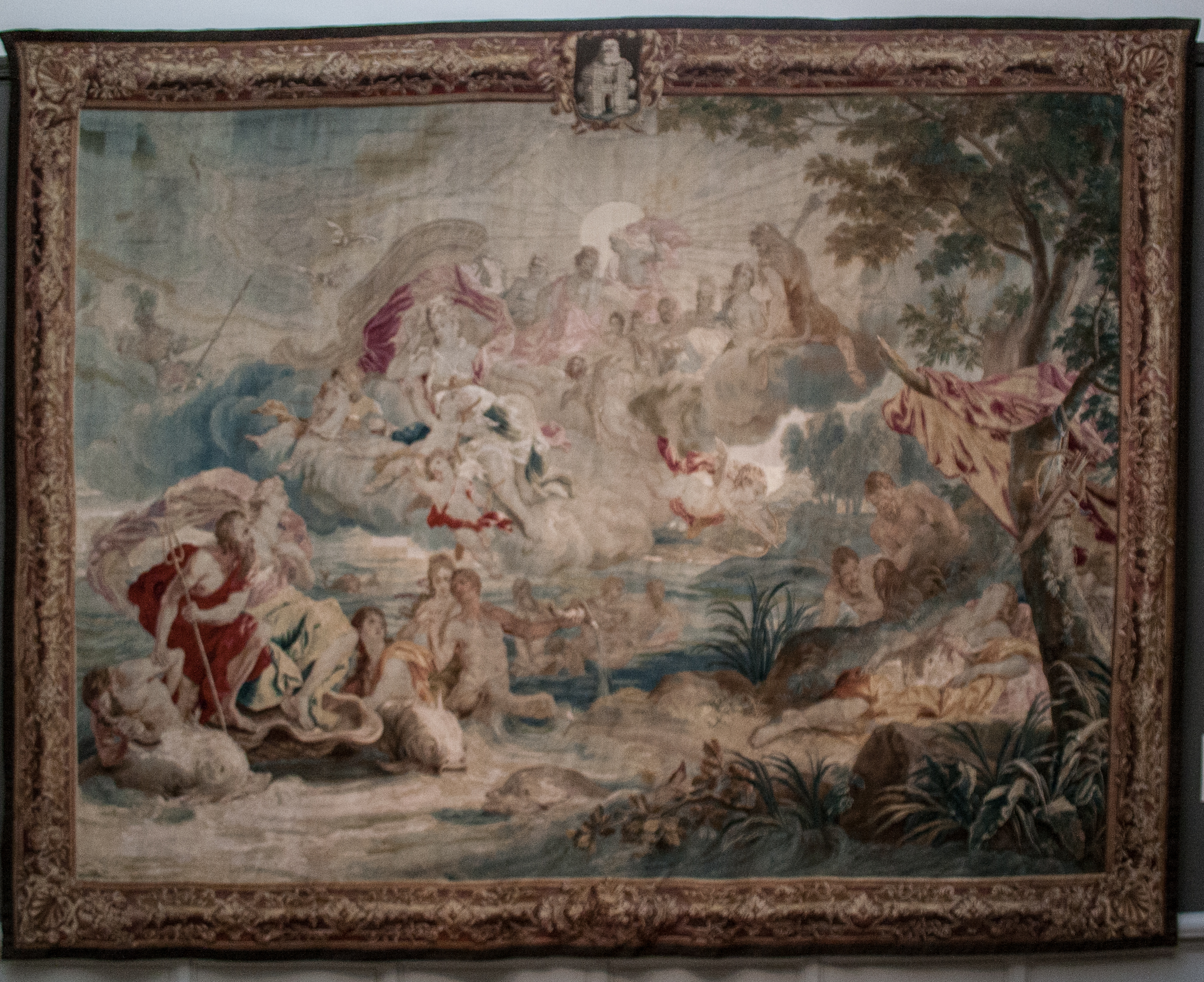

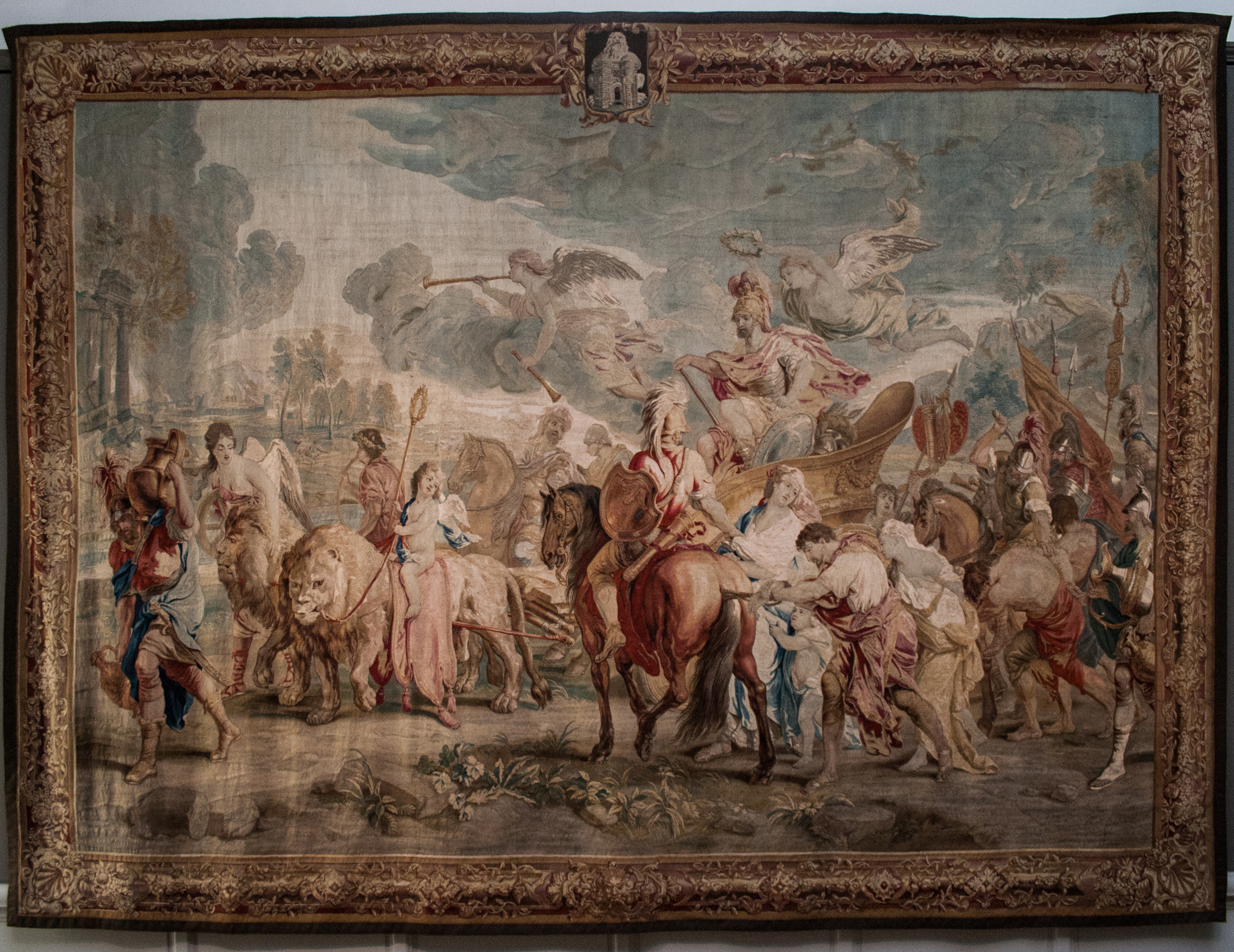

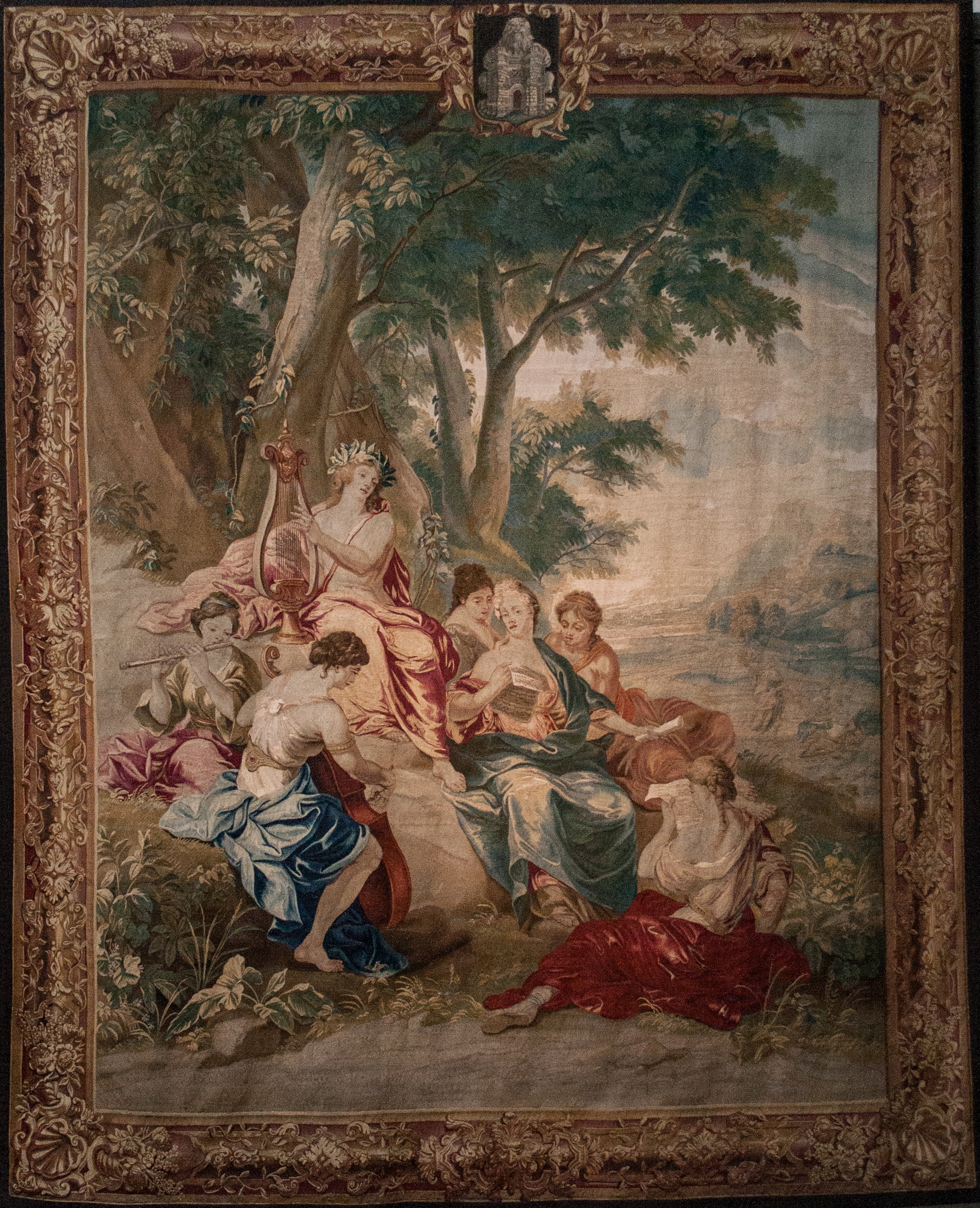

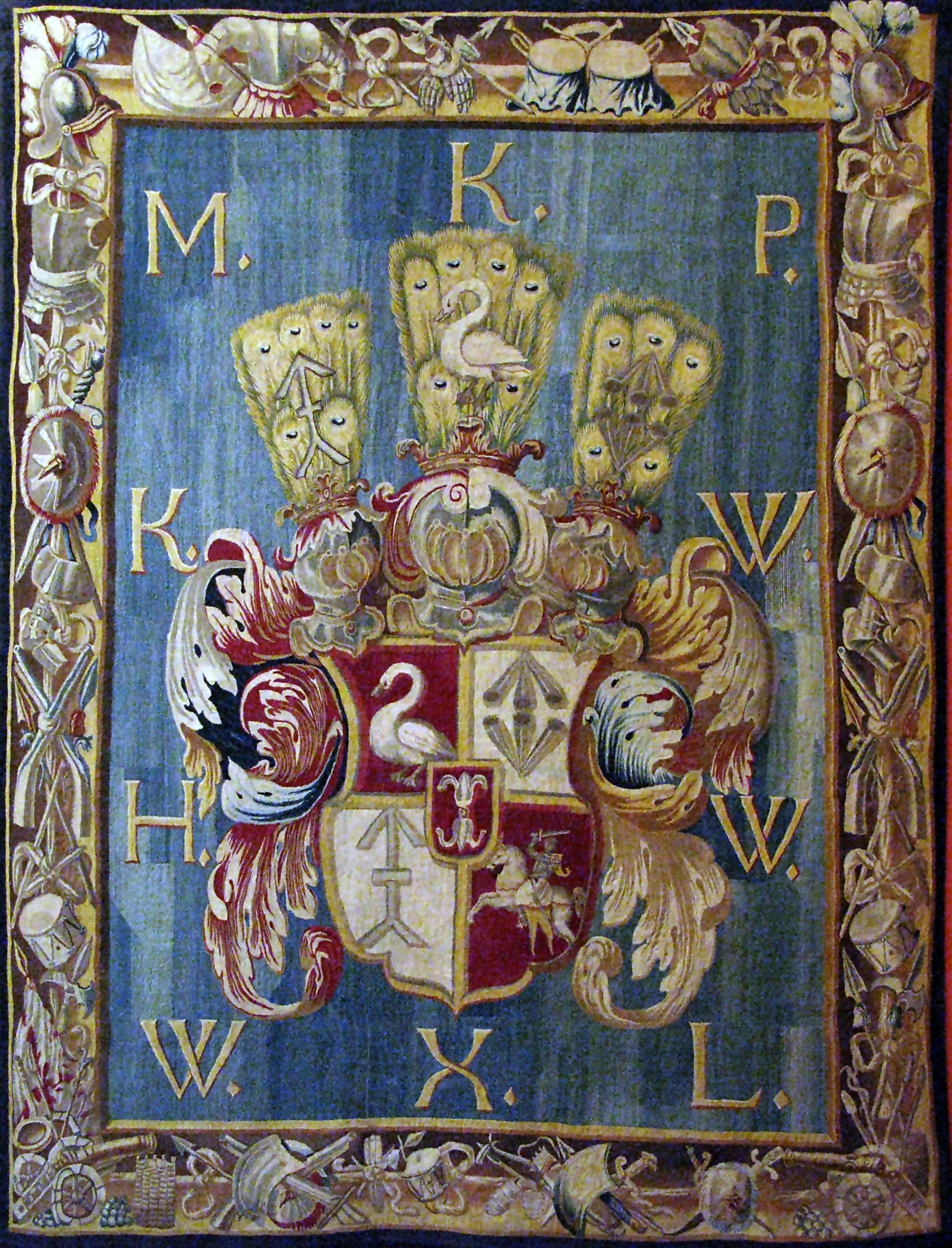

== Heraldry ==
Coat of arms of the Leyniers family
| Notes These arms are those of the Leyniers branch that was ennobled by King Leopold II on 20 December 1906 and were modified from the original family arms that were used as early as 1713. Adopted 1906 Crest The same goat issant. Torse Argent and azure. Helm Argent, grilled, collared and edged or, doubled and stringed gules. Escutcheon Azure, a goat rampant argent atop a rock proper. Motto DEO ET ARTE (Latin for God and Art) Other elements Lambrequins argent and azure Previous versions |

== Allied families ==
- de Bay
- vanden Cautere
- Delsarte
- De Maeyere
- Devolder
- van Dievoet
- François
- van Helmont
- L'Olivier
- de Maeyere
- van der Meulen
- van Orley
- van Overloop
- Platteborse
- van Schoonendonck
- Tharin
- t'Kindt

== See also ==
- Brussels tapestry
- Bourgeois of Brussels
- Drapery Court of Brussels
- Seven Noble Houses of Brussels
- Guilds of Brussels
- Belgian Resistance
- German occupation of Belgium during WWII

== Bibliography ==
- 1878 : Alphonse Wauters, Les tapisseries bruxelloises. Essai historique sur les tapisseries et les tapissiers de haute- et basse-lice de Bruxelles, Ve Julien Printer, Baertsoen, Bruxelles, 1878.
- 1978 : Sophie Schneebalg-Perelman, « Les débuts de la tapisserie bruxelloise au XIVe siècle et son importance durant la première moitié du XVe siècle » in Annales de la Société royale d'archéologie de Bruxelles, Volume LV, 1978.
- 1988 : Michel Vanwelkenhuyzen and Pierre de Tienne, « Une famille de tapissiers bruxellois, les Leyniers », in: L'intermédiaire des généalogistes, Bruxelles, n°256, nov-déc 1988.
- 1992 : Paul Begheyn, Abraham Leyniers : een Nijmeegse boekverkoper uit de zeventiende eeuw : met een uitgave van zijn correspondentie uit de jaren 1634-1644, Nimègue, Nijmeegs Museum ‘Commanderie van Sint Jan’, 1992.
- 2004 : Koenraad Brosens, A Contextual Study of Brussels Tapestry, 1670-1770. The Dye Works and Tapestry Workshop of Urbanus Leyniers (1674-1747), Brussels : Academy Palace, 2004.

== Authority ==
Content in this edit is translated from the existing French Wikipedia article at fr:Famille Leyniers; see its history for attribution.
