= Catherine van den Eynde =

Flemish tapestry weaver

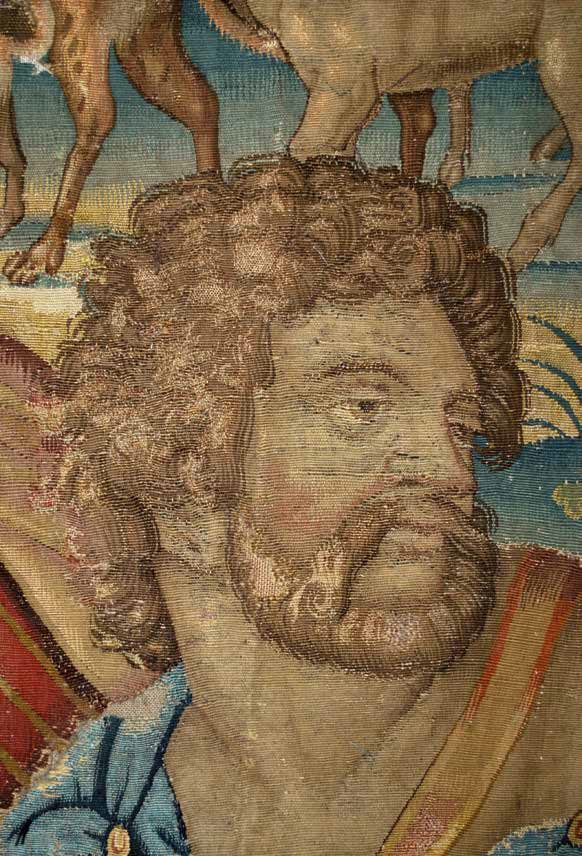
Animals Entering the Ark of Noah, c. 1605–1615, detail, head of a son of Noah

Catherine van den Eynde (died 1620/1629) was a Flemish tapestry weaver active in Brussels in the late 16th and early 17th centuries. She was among the leading entrepreneurs of Brussels in the early 17th century.

== Biography ==
Catherine van den Eynde was the wife of fellow tapestry weaver Jacques Geubels I. After the death of her husband in 1605, she continued his workshop in Brussels. She was privileged in 1613. She ran the workshop until her death, which came to pass between 1620, the year she made her will, and 1629, the date of a document listing the most important weavers in Brussels, in which her name is not present. According to tapestry historian Nora de Poorter, she died between 27 January and 15 March 1629.

=== Work ===
Like her husband, she worked frequently with other Brussels workshops. The most durable and productive partnership was the one with the workshop of Jan Raes II. Raes' workshop and hers were at the time the most popular in Brussels. She and Raes split the profits of every sale. Among her works produced in partnership with Raes are: Landscapes with Animals, Acts of the Apostles (after Raphael), Decius Mus (after Rubens), all of which are currently located at the Patrimonio Nacional in Madrid. Van den Eynde's Leopard Over a Pond (woven between 1611 and 1614) and Raes' Ostriches were probably also woven in partnership between the two workshops (as the two panels, signed by Van den Eynde and Raes respectively, were both in a set sent to Rome in 1614).

In the 1600s, she wove several tapestries for the archdukes Albert and Isabella, including a Story of Joshua (1605), a Story of the Trojan War (1605), and a Story of Cleopatra (1607).

She and Geubels had a daughter, Catharina, born in 1592, and a son, Jacques Geubels II, who continued the family workshop with some success. In his time, the workshop was still one of the most popular of Brussels. Catharina Geubels was the godmother of Jan Raes the First's daughter Catharina (born in 1611).

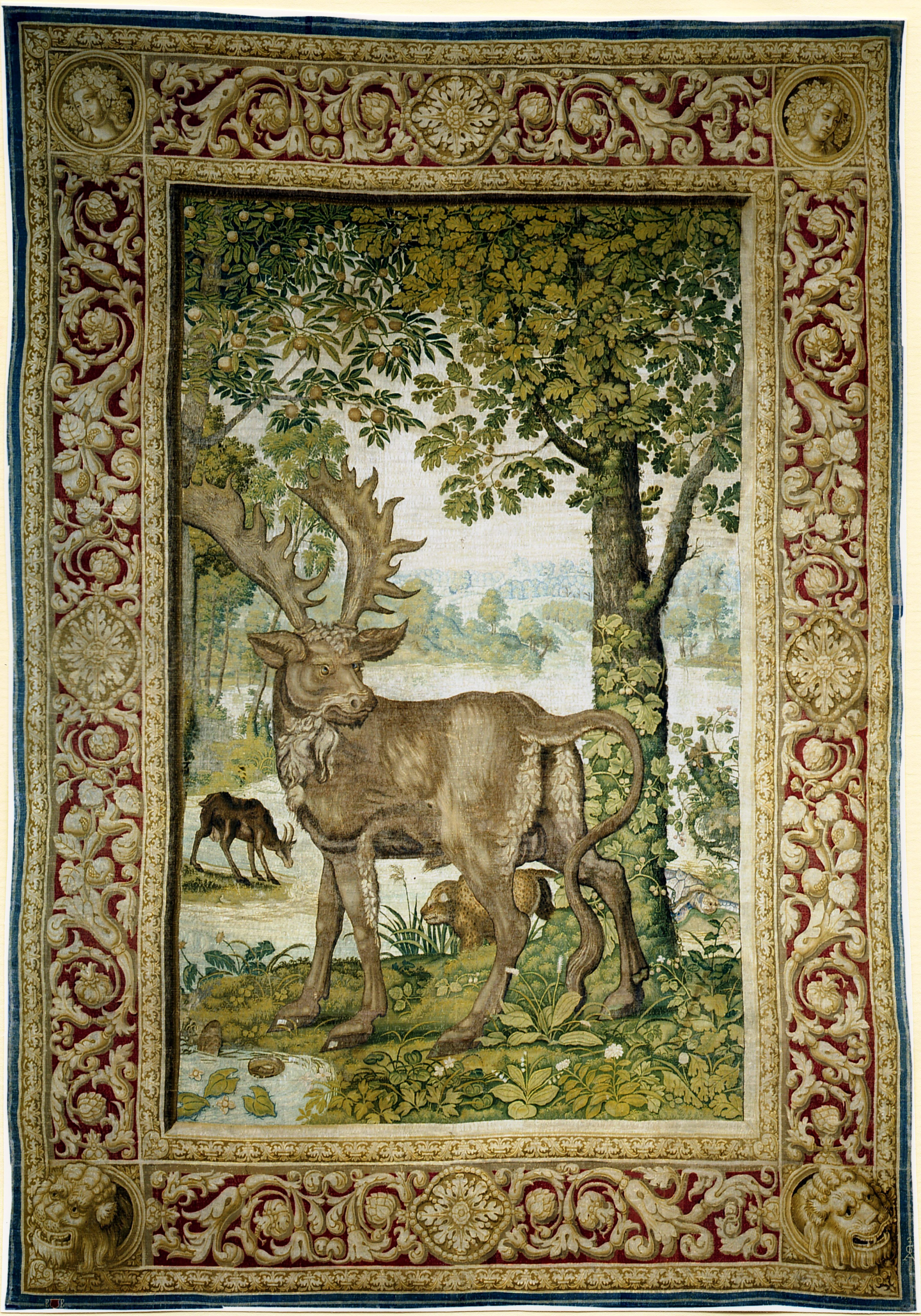
Landscape with a Deer, 1611–1617

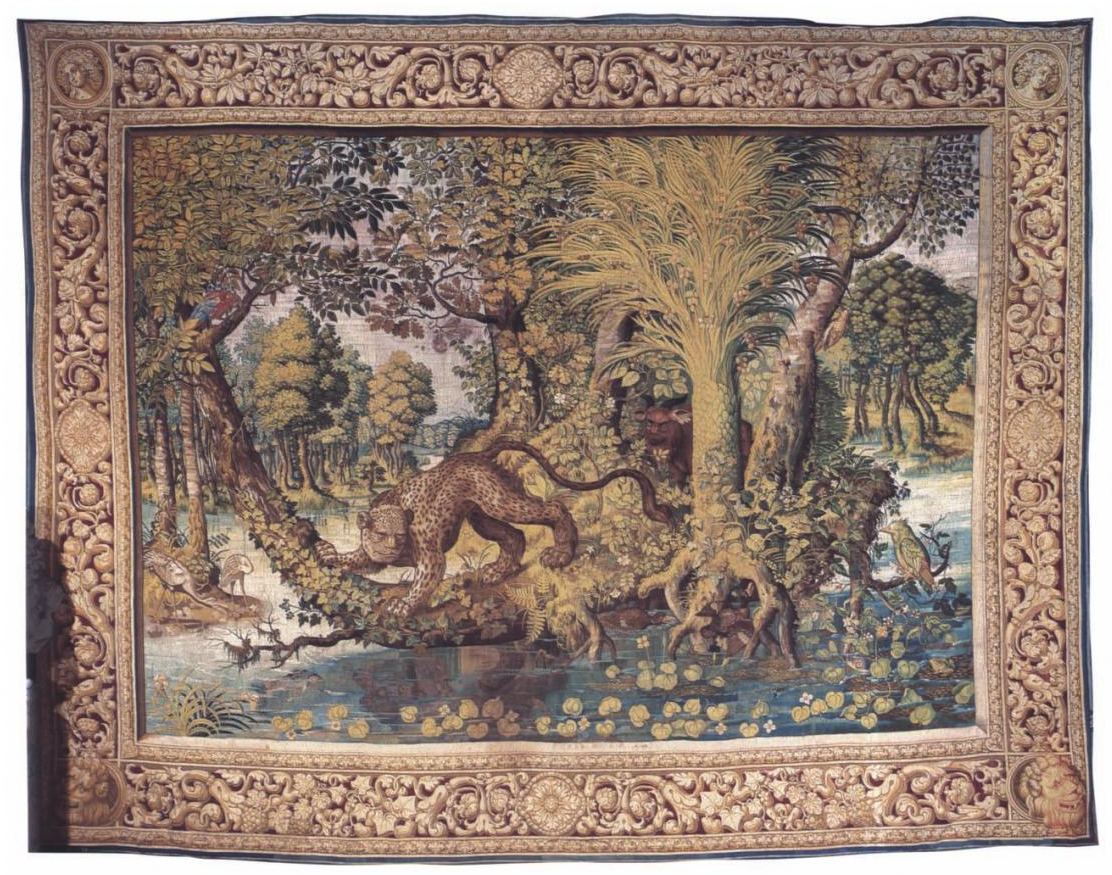
Leopard Over a Pond, 1611–1614

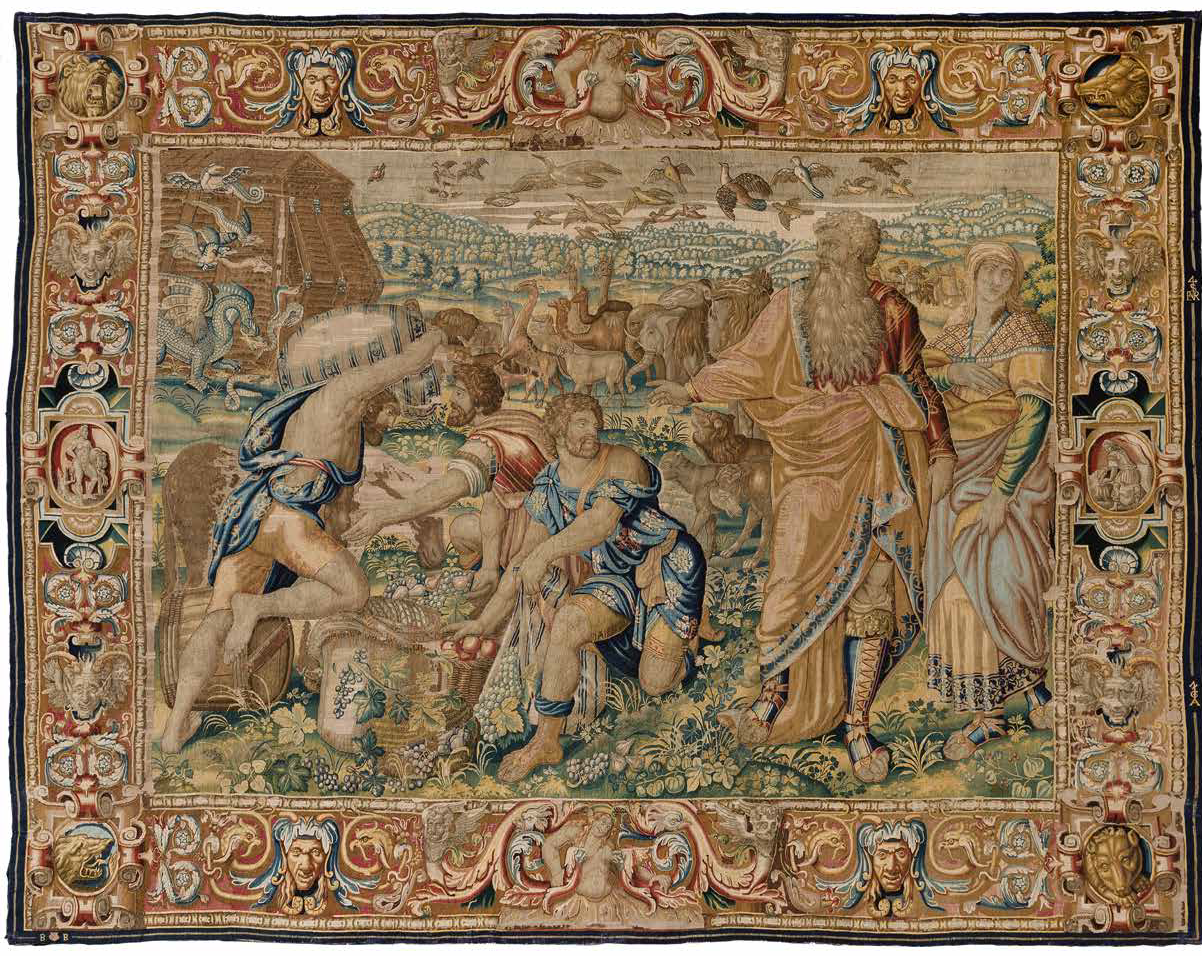
Animals Entering the Ark of Noah, c. 1605–1615

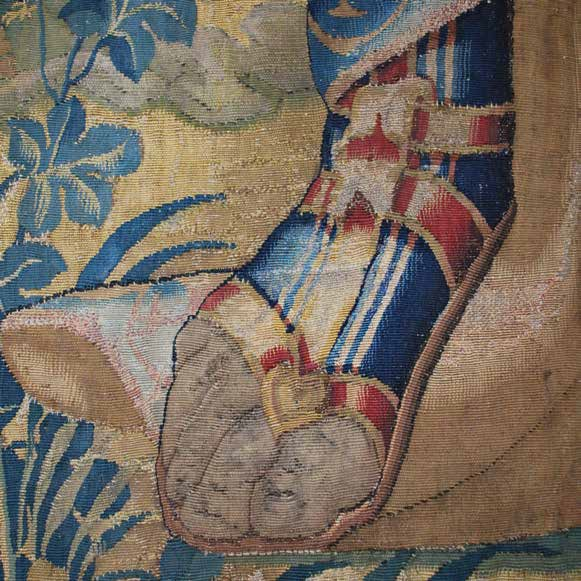
Animals Entering the Ark of Noah, detail, shoe of Noah
