= Brussels tapestry =

Workshops from 15th century

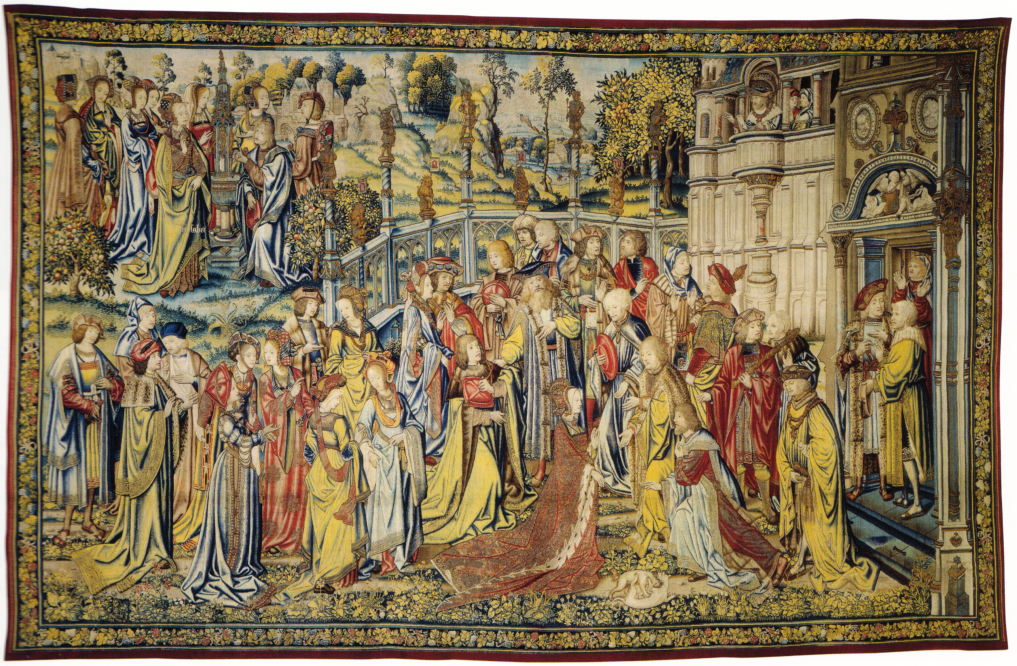
David Sees Bathsheba Washing and Invites Her to His Palace from The Story of David, Brussels, ca 1526–28 (Musée National de la Renaissance, Écouen)

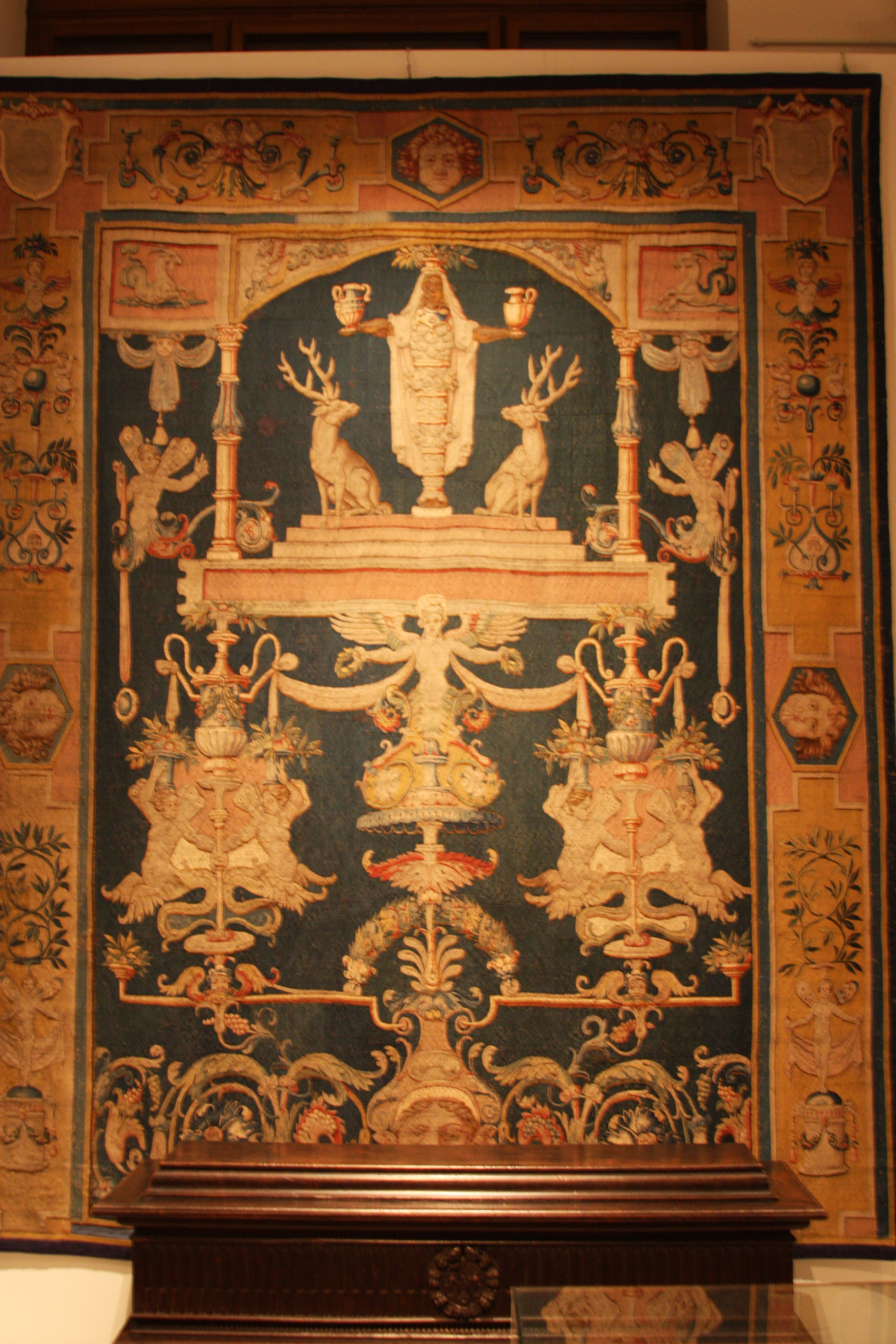
Diana of Ephesus, after a cartoon by Perino del Vaga, Brussels, 1545, woven for Andrea Doria of Genoa (Nationalmuseum, Stockholm)

Brussels tapestry workshops produced tapestry from at least the 15th century, but the city's early production in the Late Gothic International style was eclipsed by the more prominent tapestry-weaving workshops based in Arras and Tournai. In 1477 Brussels, capital of the Duchy of Brabant, was inherited by the house of Habsburg; and in the same year Arras, the prominent center of tapestry-weaving in the Low Countries, was sacked and its tapestry manufacture never recovered, and Tournai and Brussels seem to have increased in importance.

The only millefleur tapestry to survive together with a record of its payment was a large heraldic millefleur carpet of very high quality made for Duke Charles the Bold of Burgundy in Brussels, of which part is now in the Bern Historical Museum. Sophie Schneebalg-Perelman's attribution to Brussels of The Lady and the Unicorn at the Musée de Cluny may well be correct.

== Under the influence of Raphael ==
The great period of Renaissance weaving in Brussels dates from the weaving entrusted by Pope Leo X to a consortium of its ateliers of the Acts of the Apostles after cartoons by Raphael, between 1515 and 1519. Leo must have been motivated by the already high technical quality of Brussels tapestries.

The conventions of a monumental pictorial representation with the effects of perspective that would be expected of a fresco or other wall decoration were applied for the first time in this prestigious set; the framing of the central subject within wide borders that proved able to be brought up to date in successive weavings, was also introduced in these 'Raphael' tapestries.

== Under the influence of Bernard van Orley ==
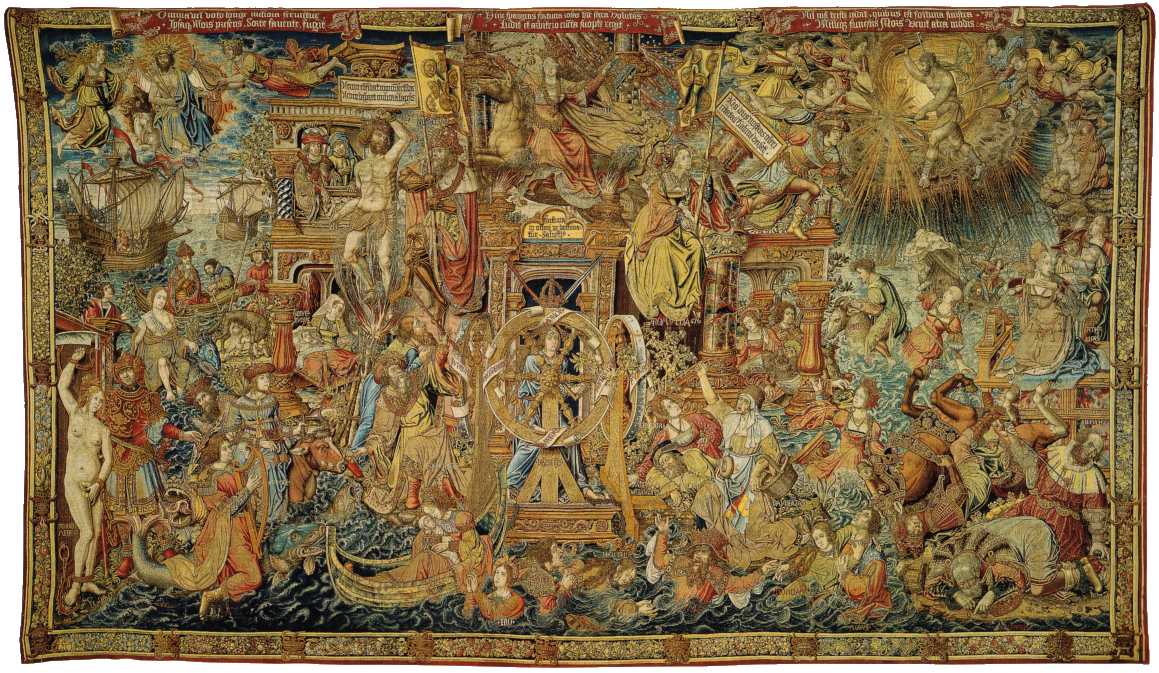
Fortuna from a set of Honors designed by Bernard van Orley and woven in the workshop of Pieter Enghien van Aelst, Brussels, ca1520 (Royal Palace of La Granja de San Ildefonso, Spain)

The prominent painter and tapestry designer Bernard van Orley (who trained in Italy) transmuted the Raphaelesque monumental figures to forge a new tapestry style that combined the Italian figural style and perspective rendition with the "multiple narratives and anecdotal and decorative detail of the Netherlandish tradition," according to Thomas P. Campbell.

A Hunts of Maximilian suite, depicting hunting in each of the months, was woven to cartoons by Bernard van Orley ca1531-33. A suite of nine allegorical Honors that celebrated the coronation of Charles V as king of Germany and his assumption of the title of Holy Roman Emperor-elect in 1520 survives among the Patrimonio Nacional, Palacio Real de la Granja de San Ildefonso, Spain. Van Orley's pupils, Pieter Coecke van Aelst and Michiel Coxie, also provided cartoons for Brussels looms under the general influence of Italian painting. A set of Seven Deadly Sins, of which four survive, are recognized as Pieter Coecke van Aelst's masterpieces.

Brussels quickly took pre-eminence in tapestry weaving. In 1528 a city decree ordained that each piece of Brussels tapestry over a certain size bear the woven mark of a red shield flanked by two B's; this aids in identifying Brussels production. Each tapestry was to include the woven mark of the maker or the merchant who commissioned the tapestry for resale. The public market for tapestry sales was Antwerp.

== French patronage ==
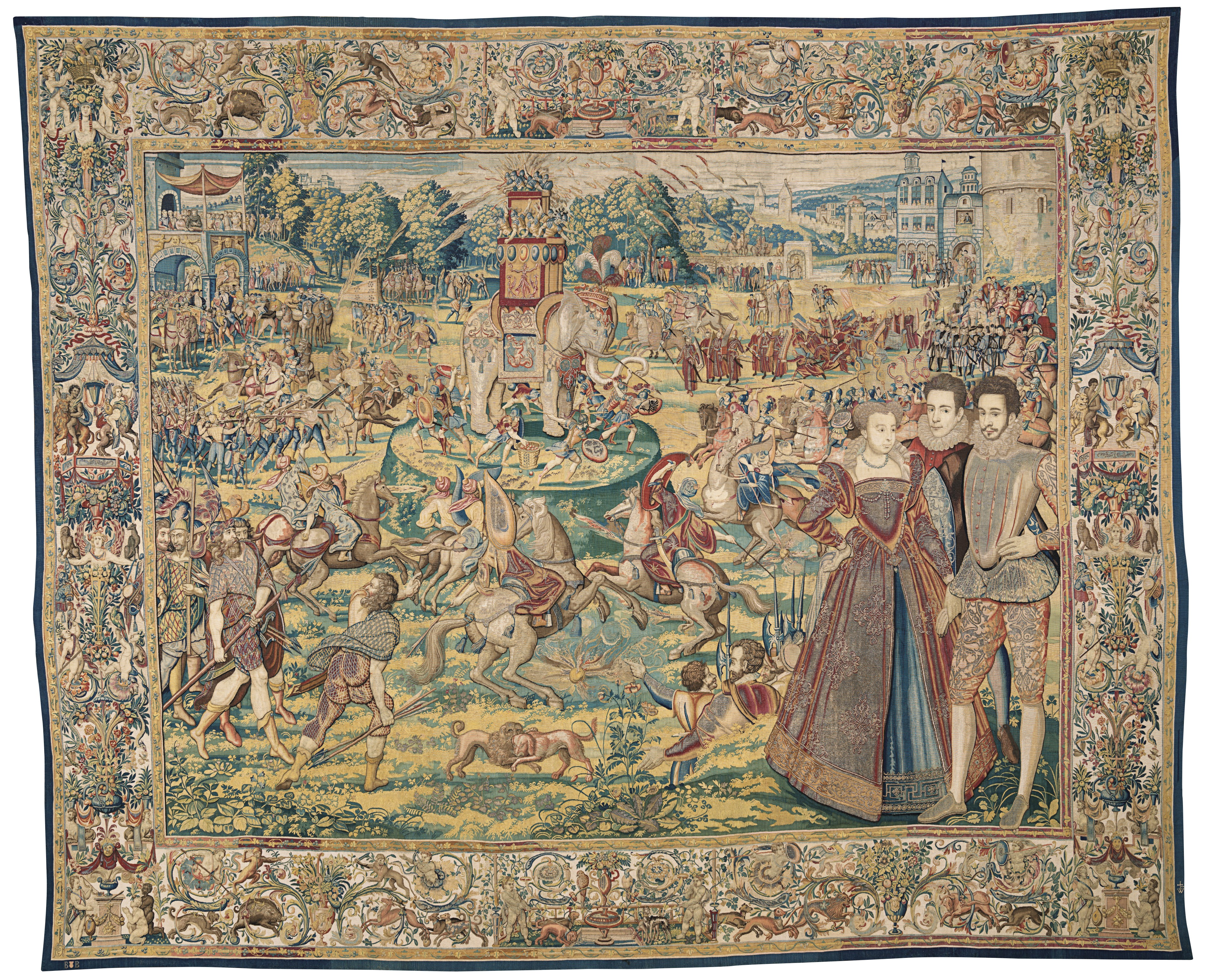
Mascarade à l'éléphant, also known as Elephant (387 x 640 cm.; 152 x 252 in.), one of the Valois tapestries, 1580s

Though he was the arch-rival of the Habsburgs, Francis I of France commissioned tapestries from Brussels and Antwerp in the early years of his reign. After the arrival of Primaticcio at Fontainebleau in 1532, it was to Brussels that the Italian painter was sent, with a preparatory drawing of a Story of Scipio Africanus to be rendered as a cartoon, with which he returned.

The prominent Brussels weaver Peter de Pannemaker executed for Francis that same year a suite enriched with silver and gold thread, to designs by Matteo del Nassaro of Verona, an engraver of gems. There were other commissions and purchases by Francis of Brussels tapestry until the establishment, about 1540 of a manufactory at Fontainebleau, under the general patronage of the King.

The 'Valois tapestries' depicting festivities at the court of France were woven in the Spanish Netherlands, likely in Brussels, shortly after 1580. Other nobles continued to support Brussels manufacture in the 16th century.

== Jagiellonian patronage ==
Most of the royal 'Jagiellonian tapestries' conserved in Poland at the Wawel Castle in Kraków were commissioned by Sigismund II Augustus of Poland in Brussels in the workshops of Willem and Jan de Kempeneer, Jan van Tieghem and Nicolas Leyniers between 1550 and 1565. Only 136 tapestries from the initial original collection of 356 pieces remain today, from which the largest part was commissioned in Brussel.

== Tudor patronage ==
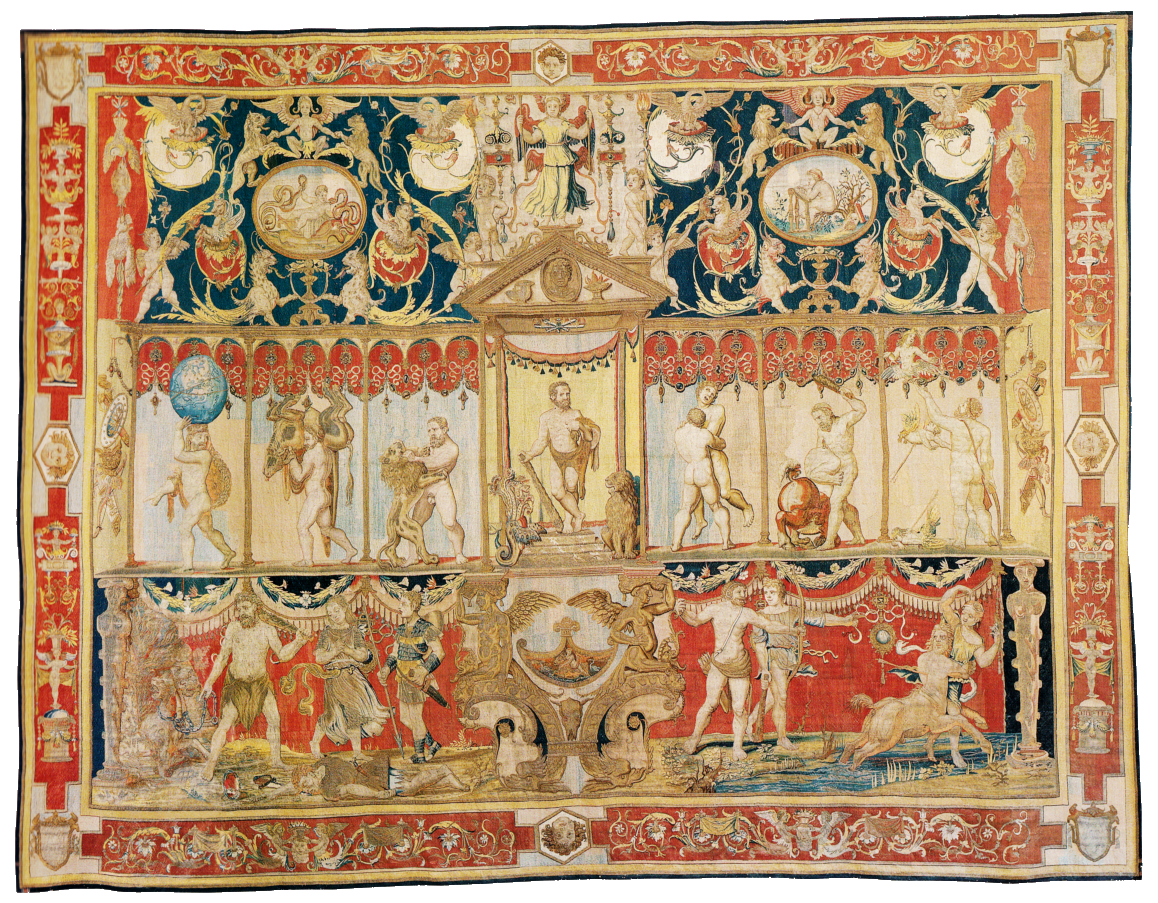
The Triumph of Hercules, woven for Henry VIII in Brussels, ca1540–42, to designs created for Leo X ca1517–20 (Hampton Court Palace, London)

In England, both Cardinal Wolsey and Henry VIII amassed large tapestry collections. Henry competed with both Charles V and Francis I in displays of courtly magnificence, and vast sums were spent on tapestries to augment the lavish settings for his meeting with Francis at the Field of Cloth of Gold in 1520 and for the visit of Charles V to England in 1522.

Wolsey furnished his palaces at York Place and Hampton Court with rich tapestries. Many of the cardinal's acquisitions illustrate Biblical texts, but he also acquired secular works, including two sets of Triumphs of Petrarch. One was purchased from the executors of the Bishop of Durham and one was commissioned directly by Wolsey. Evidence associates this later set with a partial set now in the Victoria & Albert Museum and likely woven in Brussels. The Seven Deadly Sins panels woven for Wolsey's bedroom at Hampton Court are also thought to be Brussels work. By the time of his fall in 1529, Wolsey's collection included over 600 tapestry pieces, old and new. But despite his commissions to the weavers of Brussels, his tastes were conventional, and none of his acquisitions seem to have been in the new style pioneered by van Orley.

Conversely, Henry VIII embraced the new Italianate style. From the later 1520s, the King's tapestry commissions reflect two marked tendencies: a selection of themes and subjects chosen as "unambiguous and pointed" propaganda, and the first appearance of the figural styles of the Italian Renaissance in England, albeit through the "distorted lens of the Brussels 'Romanist' artists."

In October 1528, Henry acquired a small set of the Twelve Months and a much larger ten-piece set of The Story of David measuring 743 1/2 ells (418 square yards) from the merchant Richard Gresham. Recent research suggests strongly that this set of the Story of David has survived intact and is the Brussels-woven set worked in wool, silk, and metal-wrapped thread now housed in the Musée National de la Renaissance, Écouen, described as "one of the finest examples in the world of pre-1530 weaving."

In the 1540s Henry commissioned Brussels reproductions of the Raphael Acts of the Apostles series and a set of Antiques also woven to designs created for Leo X ca 1517–20 by artists of the Raphael workshop. Two of these, The Triumph of Hercules and the Triumph of Bacchus, remain in the Royal Collection and are hung in Hampton Court Palace.

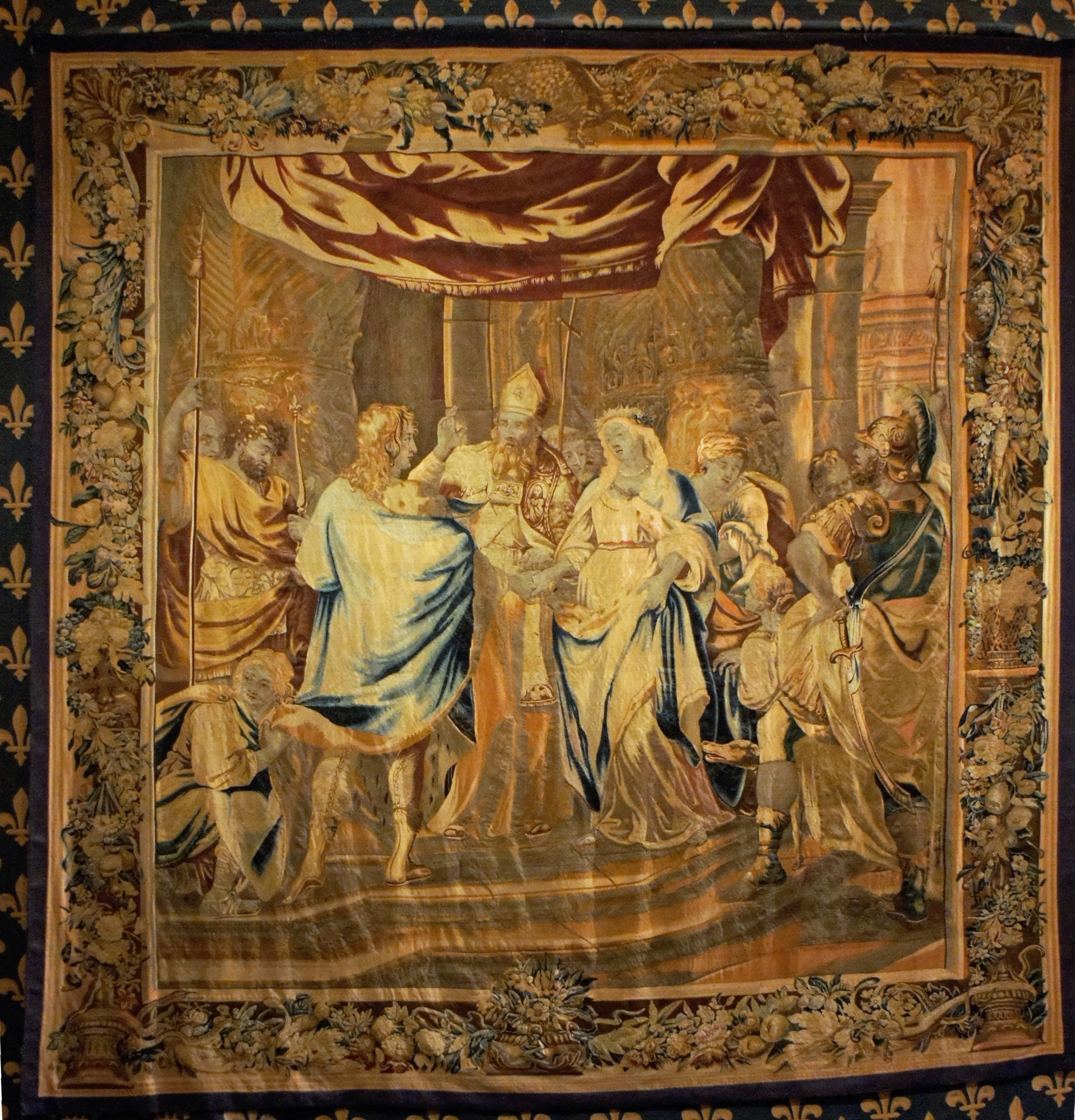
The Marriage of Clovis (detail) by Jean Le Clerc, Brussels, 17th century (ex-Palace of Tau)

== Under the influence of Rubens ==
At the end of the 16th century, Spanish Habsburg persecution of Protestants in the Low Countries dispersed many weavers to the advantage of tapestry workshops in Delft and Middelburg, England and Germany, with a consequent drop in the quality of Brussels production. The Brussels looms soon revived in the optimistic atmosphere of the Twelve Years' Truce (1609–21) and under the major design influence on 17th-century Brussels tapestry, the Baroque style of Peter Paul Rubens, who carried out four suites of drawings expressly for tapestry. Rubens' connection with tapestry design commenced in November 1611 with the contract signed in Antwerp by the Genoese merchant Franco Cattaneo, the Brussels trader-weaver Jan II Raes, and the Antwerp dealer and weaver Frans Sweerts, for a suite of the History of Decius Mus on cartoons by Rubens, carried out in 1616–18.

The prominent atelier of Jan Raes the Elder and Younger had executed a set of Animals in Landscapes in collaboration with the atelier of Catherine van den Eynde for Cardinal Montalto. and a suite of the History of Samson. Among the most ambitious projects to cartoons of Rubens were the eighteen pieces of The Triumph of the Eucharist commissioned in 1627 by Isabella Clara Eugenia, Habsburg governess of the Spanish Netherlands, that were destined for the royal monastery of the Descalzas Reales di Madrid, where they remain to this day; the hangings, costing 100,000 guilders, a great boost to the tapestry industry in Brussels at the time, were woven in the ateliers of Jan II Raes, Jacques Fobert, Jan Vervoert, Jan Newoert and Jacob Geubels.

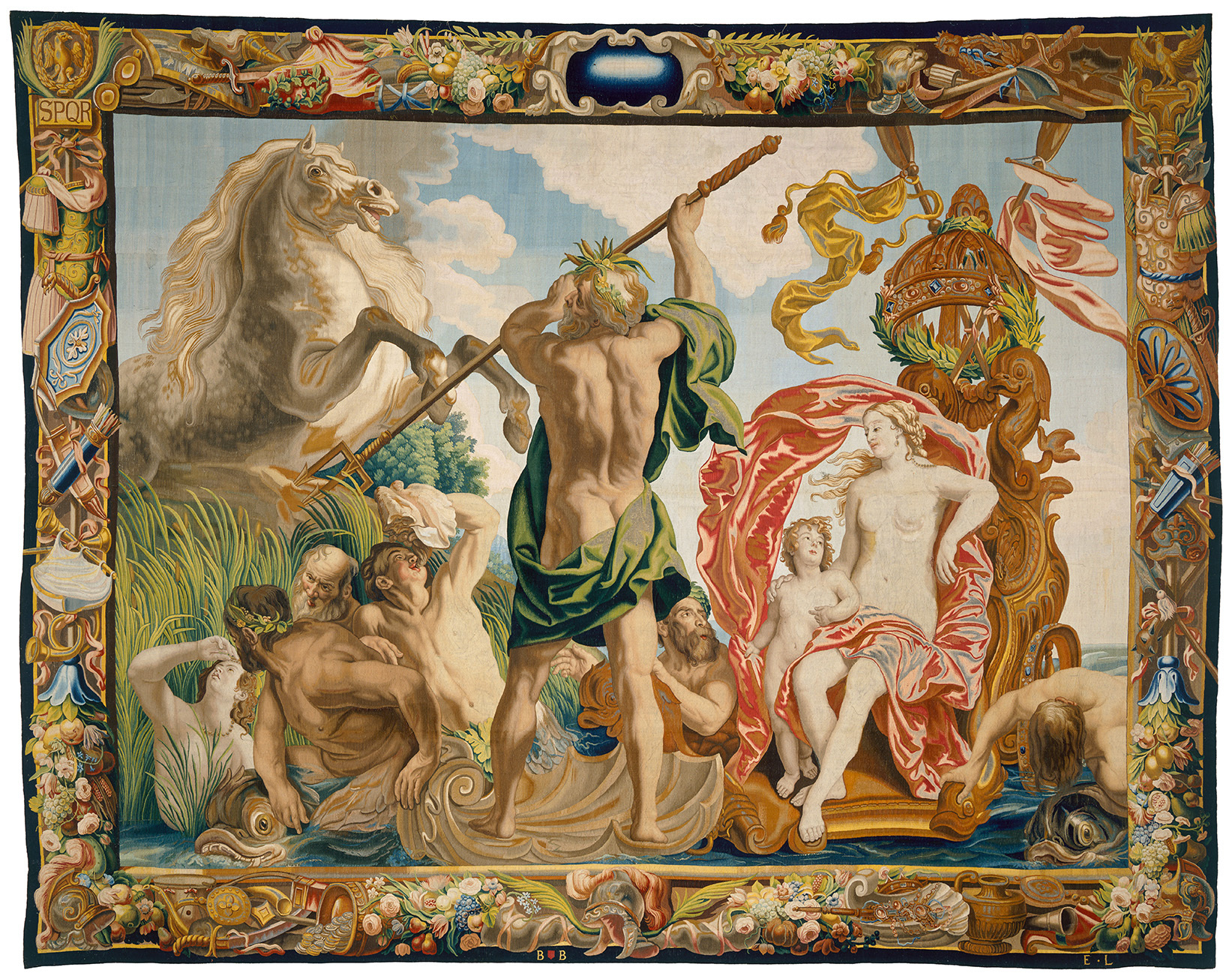
Neptune Tames a Horse, woven by Everard Leyniers after Jacob Jordaens, Brussels, ca1650-60 (Kunsthistorisches Museum, Vienna)

Other leading Brussels ateliers of the 17th century were directed by Martin Reymbouts and members of the Leyniers family. Rubens's pupil Jacob Jordaens also provided many cartoons for tapestries. Kermesse subjects drawn from village life in the manner of the Teniers, father and son, were often woven at Brussels in the 17th and 18th centuries.

== French connections and competition ==
When Louis XIV's minister Jean-Baptiste Colbert organized the royal Gobelins Manufactory, an early suite was The Acts of the Apostles first woven at Brussels. The Brussels workshops soon fell under the influence of French design originating from the royally supported Gobelins, to the extent that the Story of Alexander suite, a thinly disguised allegory trumpeting the ascendancy of Louis XIV, were woven also at Brussels, among other places. Brussels received an influx of highly trained workers when the Gobelins was temporarily closed in 1694 and the weavers ordered to disperse, under the financial stringencies of Louis XIV's wars.

The 18th century saw the increased competition of the French workshops, both royal and private. Weavers like Le Clerc, Leyniers, van den Hecke and de Vos maintained quality, but the last of the traditional Brussels tapestry ateliers closed at the time of the French Revolution, by which time tapestry was finally becoming less popular; Goya's designs for the Royal Tapestry Factory in Spain were perhaps the last major works in the medium.

== Gallery ==
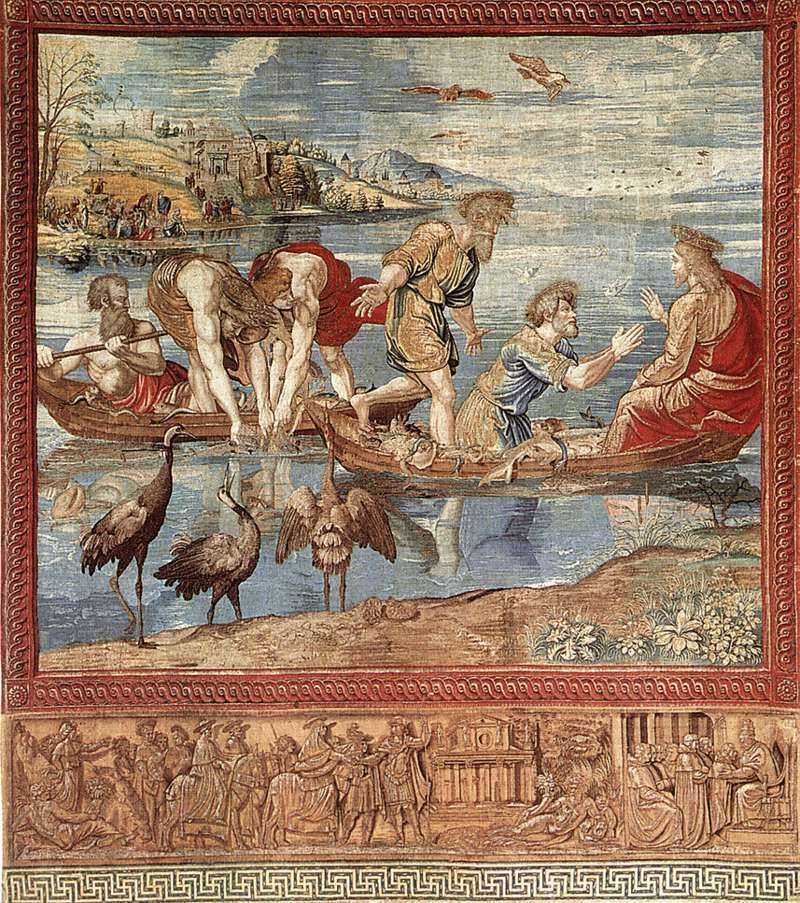
The Miraculous Draught of Fishes from the Acts of the Apostles, workshop of Pieter d'Enghien van Aelst after a cartoon by Raphael, ca1517-1519 (Vatican Museums)

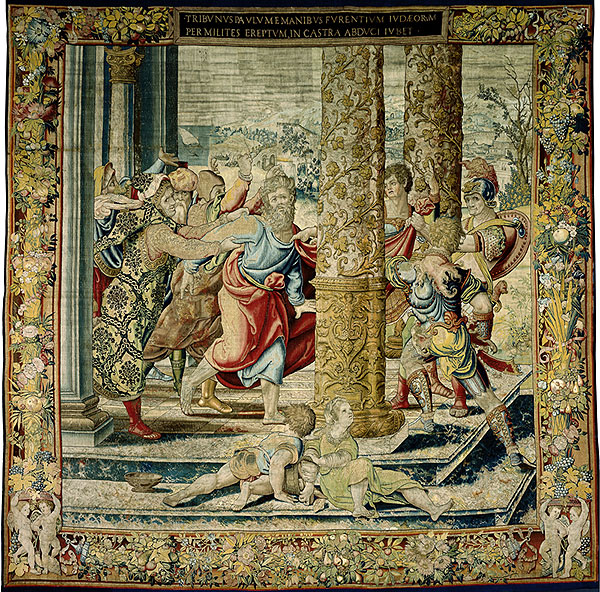
The Life of Paul, by Pieter Coecke van Aelst, Brussels, ca1535-40

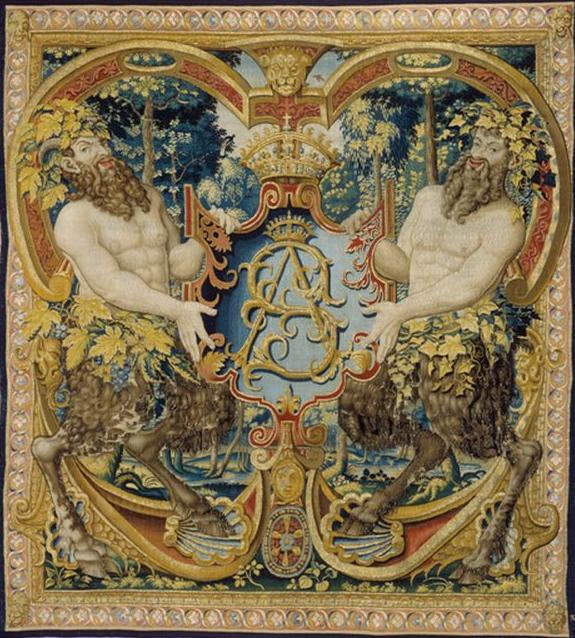
Tapestry with shield-bearing satyrs and monogram SA of Sigismund Augustus, Brussels, ca1555.

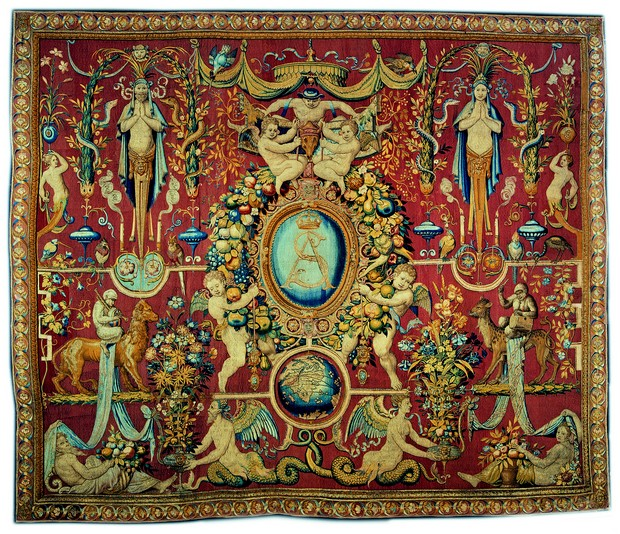
Arabesque tapestry with the monogram of Sigismund Augustus, Brussels, ca1555

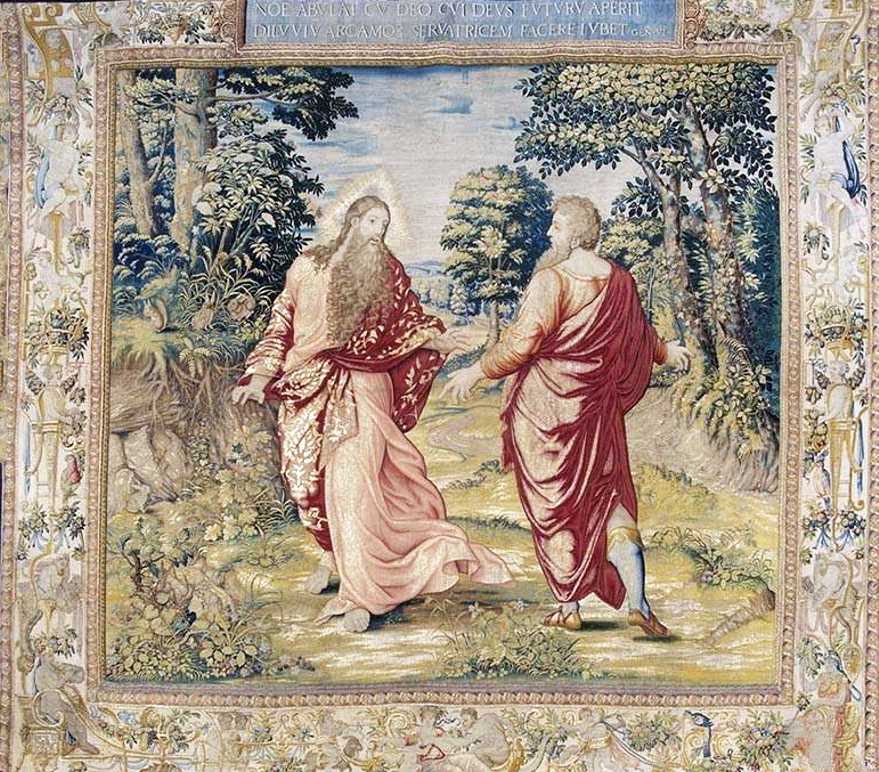
God and Noah, Jan de Kempeneer, from a cartoon by Michiel Coxie, mid-16th century

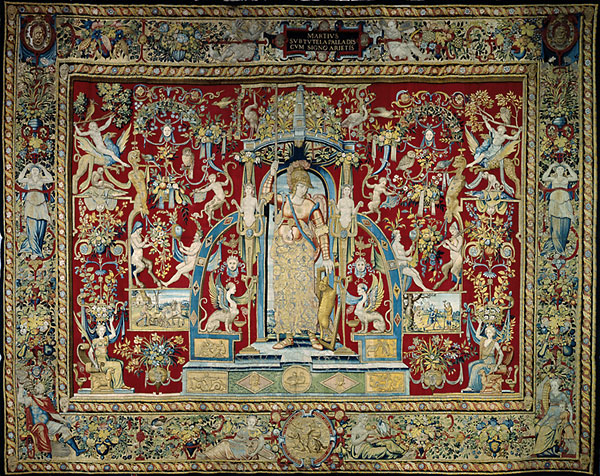
Tapestry from a suite of Months, woven by Cornelis de Ronde, Brussels, mid-16th century (Kunsthistorisches Museum, Vienna)

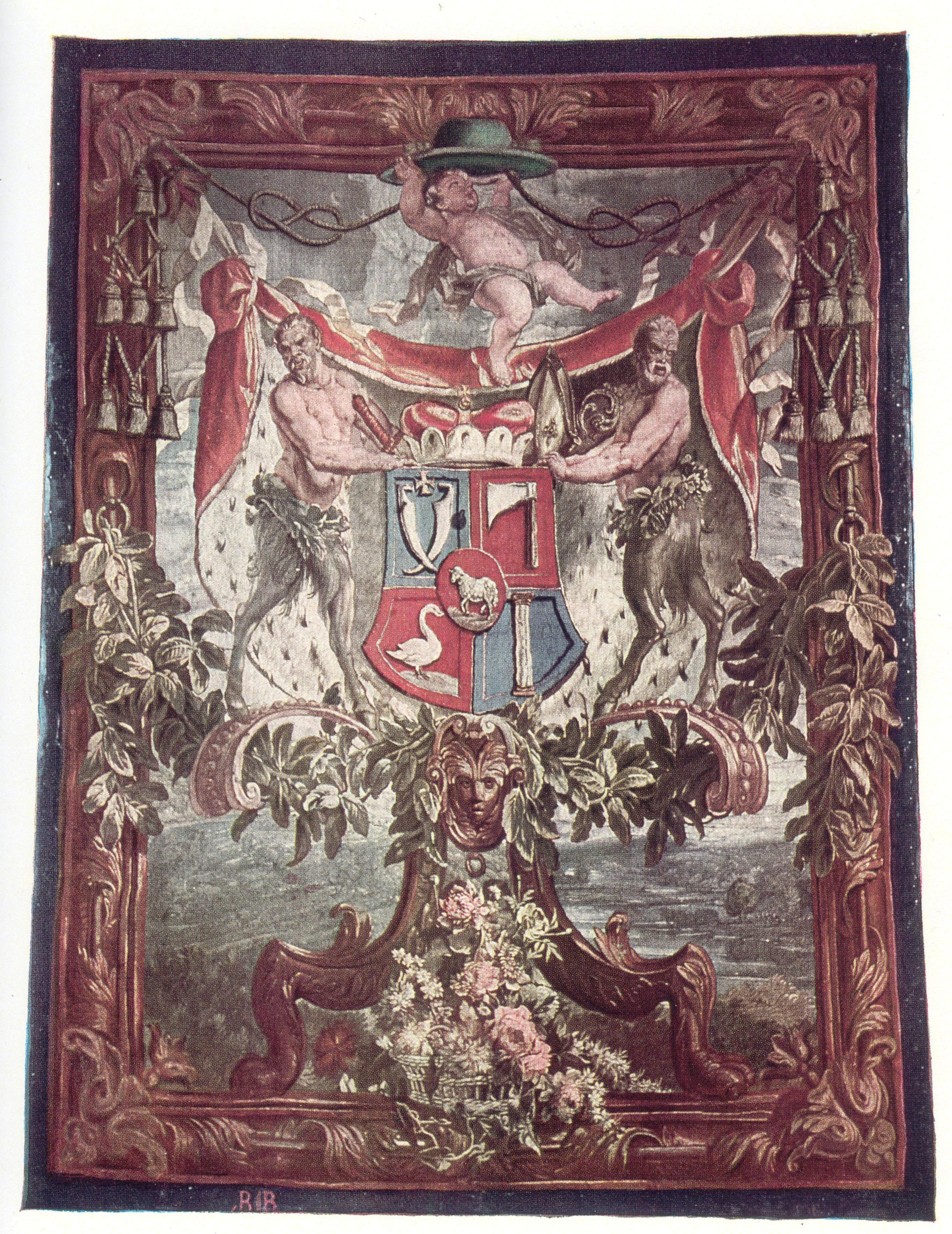
Tapestry with the arms of Cardinal Załuski

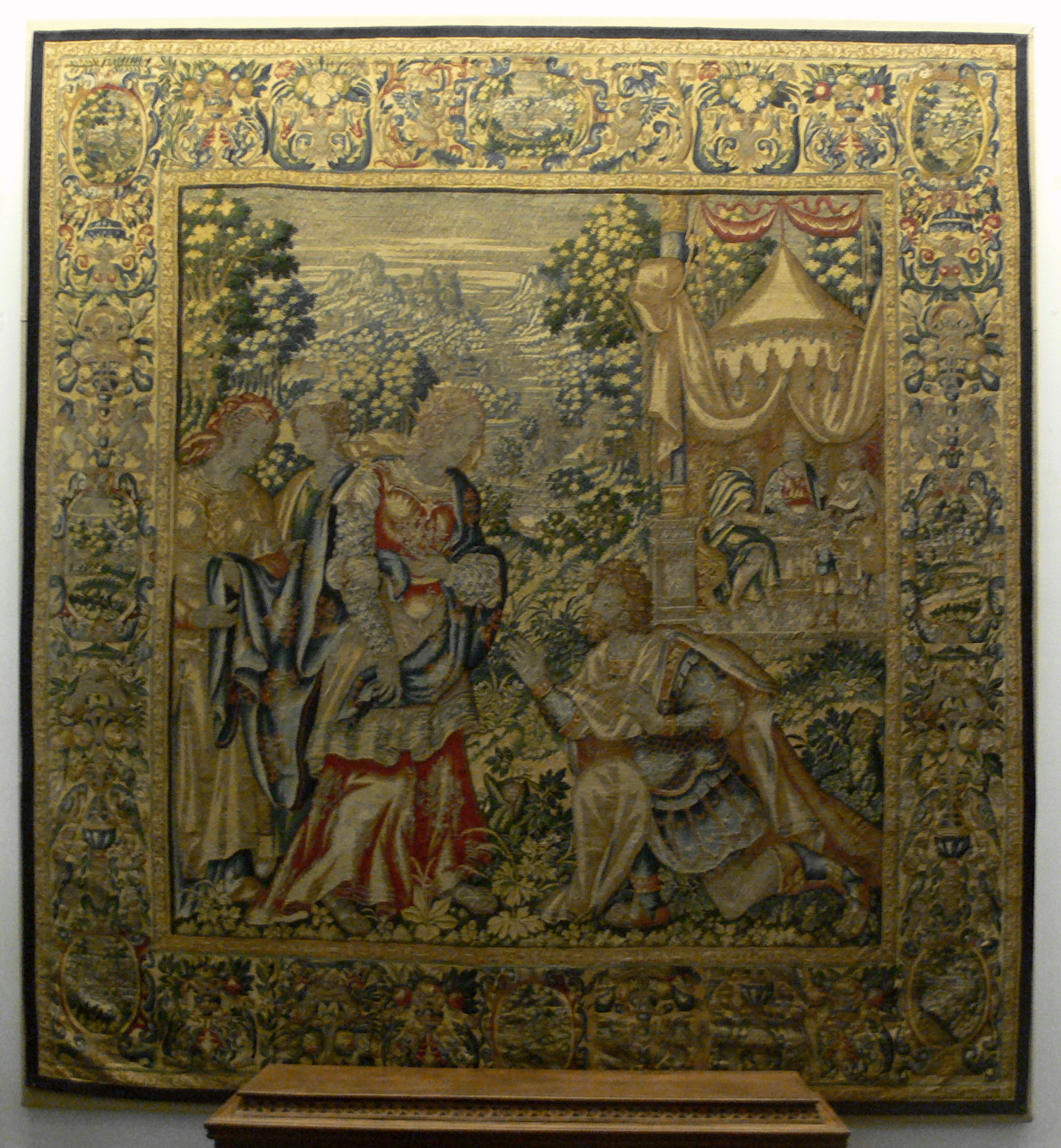
Haman Begs Esther for Mercy from a suite Story of Esther, 2nd half 16th century (Kunstgewerbemuseum Berlin)

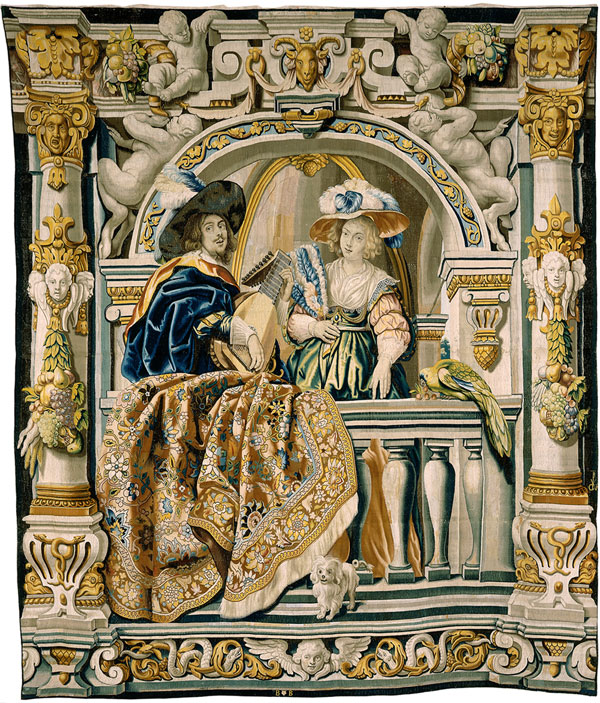
Cavalier and Lady woven by Conrad van der Brugghen after Jacob Jordaens, Brussels, 2nd quarter of the 17th century (Kunsthistorisches Museum, Vienna)
