= Jan Raes II =

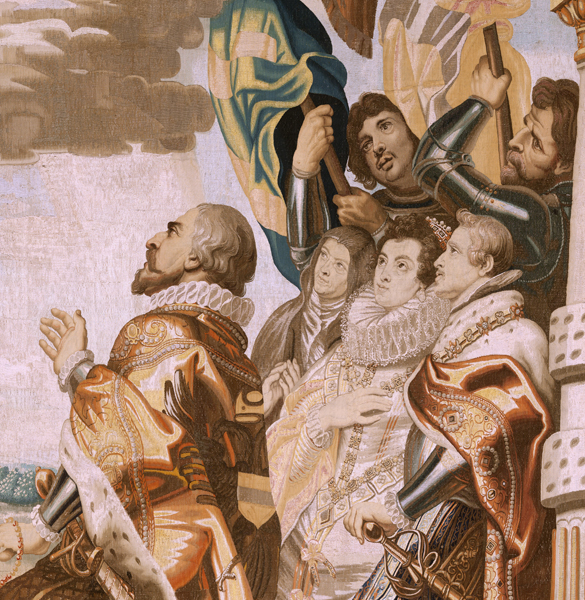
Tapestry from The Triumph of the Eucharist series, 1626–1628

Jan Raes II (1602 – 1639) was a Flemish tapestry weaver chiefly active between 1617 and 1639 in Brussels.

== Biography ==
Jan Raes the Second was born in 1602, the son of tapestry weaver Jan Raes the First and Margriet van den Acker. His parents had another child named Jan, born in 1593, who thus evidently died before Raes II's birth. His mother died in 1650 and his father was buried on 1 July 1651. He had nine siblings: Anna, Francesca, Dorothea, Sebastiaan (born 1604), Daniel (born 1605), François (born 1607), Peter (born 1609), and Catharina (born 1611), whose godmother was Catharina Geubels, daughter of Jacques Geubles and Catherine van den Eynde.

His father, who was baptized in the Chapel Church of Brussels in 1574, belonged to the Brussels socioeconomic elite. He started as a tapestry weaver at about 20 and went on to have an impressive career in Brussels politics as well, being a councillor of the city many times, dean of the tapestry guild in 1619, collector in 1618, 1619, and 1635, treasurer of the Board of Shipping in 1620 and 1636, and burgomaster in 1623, 1633, and 1634. His father frequently worked in partnership with the studio of Jacques Geubels and later of Catherine van den Eynde, and with the workshop of his son. Likewise, Jan Raes II frequently collaborated with the Geubels/van den Eynde studio, such as when they jointly realized the set Landscapes with Animals for Cardinal Montalto.

In 1627, Jan Raes the Second married Johanna Bexij, by whom he had two daughters: Catharina (born 1630) and Maria-Anna (born 1632).

He died in or around 1639, as a document by upholsterer Jan de Strycker dated 12 March 1639 states that Jan Raes the Younger had "died recently".

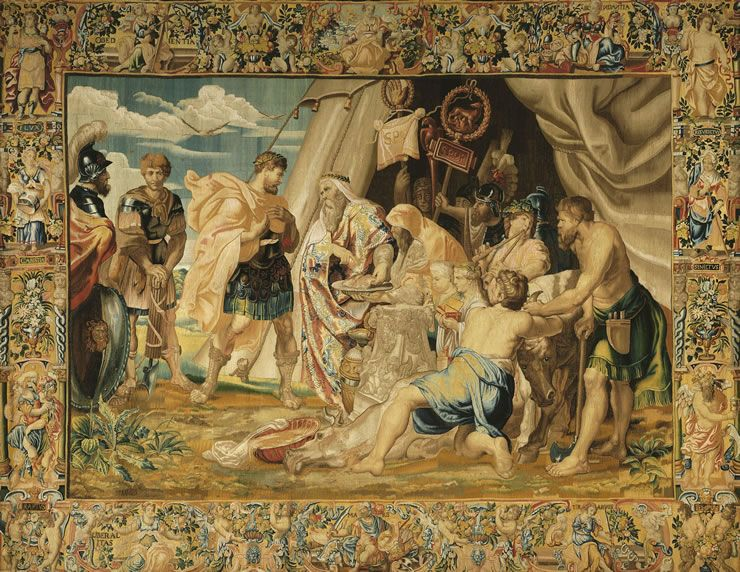
The Oracle of Decius Mus, c. 1650

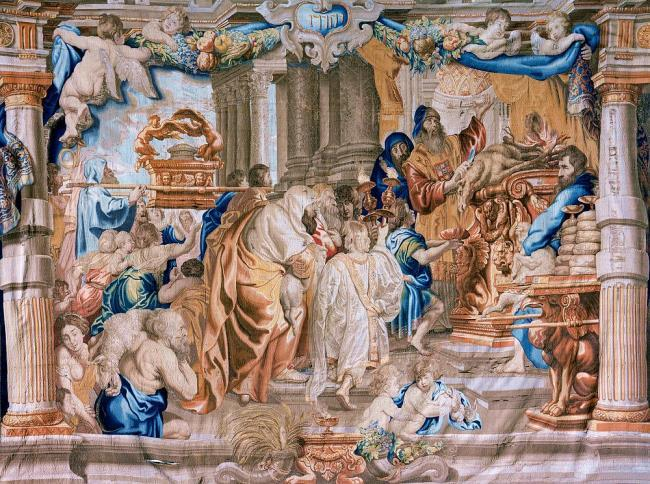
The Sacrifice of the Old Covenant, c. 1628

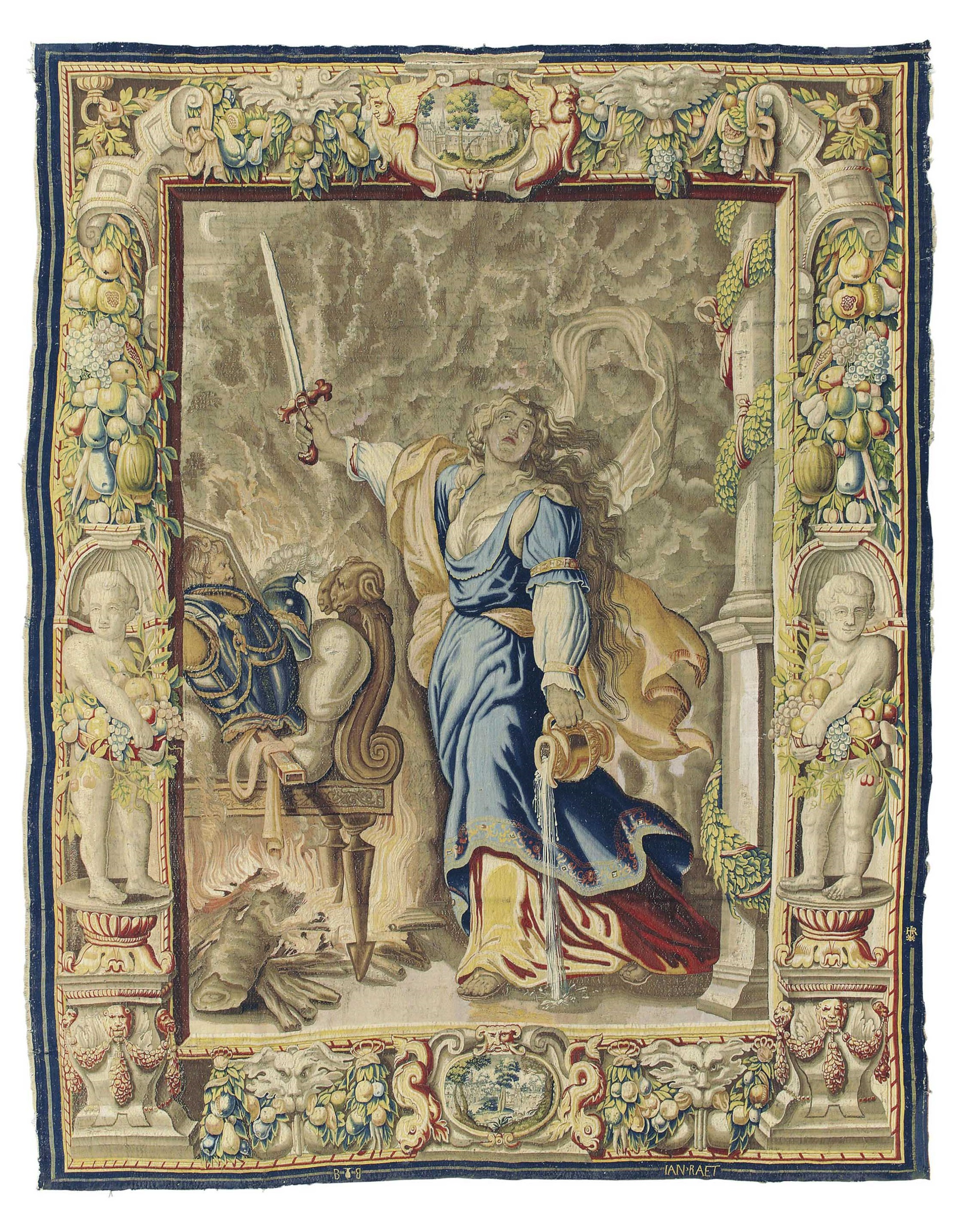
A Flemish Mythological Tapestry, early 17th century

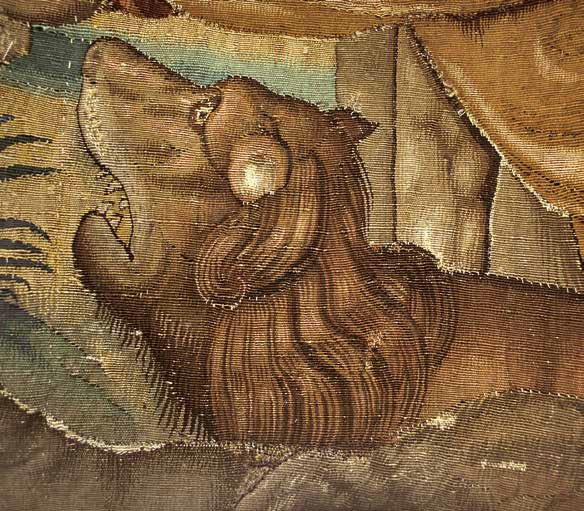
Animals Entering the Ark of Noah, detail of a lion

== Sources ==
- Guy Delmarcel, Het Vlaamse wandtapijt van de 15de tot de 18de eeuw, Tielt: Lannoo, 1999, p. 368
- Ulrich Thieme, Felix Becker, Allgemeines Lexikon der bildenden Künstler : von der Antike bis zur Gegenwart, vol. 27, Leipzig: Seemann, 1907-1950, p. 560
- N. Forti Grazzini, Brussels Tapestries for Italian Customers: Cardinal Montalto's Landscapes with Animals made by Jan II Raes and Catherine van den Eynde, in I. Alexander-Skipnes, Cultural exchange between the Low Countries and Italy (1400-1600), Turnhout, 2007, pp. 239–265
- K. Brosens, New Light on the Raes Workshop in Brussels and Rubens's Achilles Series, in: T.P. Campbell and A.H. Cleland (ed.), Tapestry in the Baroque. New Aspects of Production and Patronage, New York et al. 2010, pp. 20–34 (with genealogical tree)
