= Fanson Castle =

Château in Liège Province, Belgium

- Château de Fanson (French)
- Xhoris, Liège Province, Wallonia, Belgium
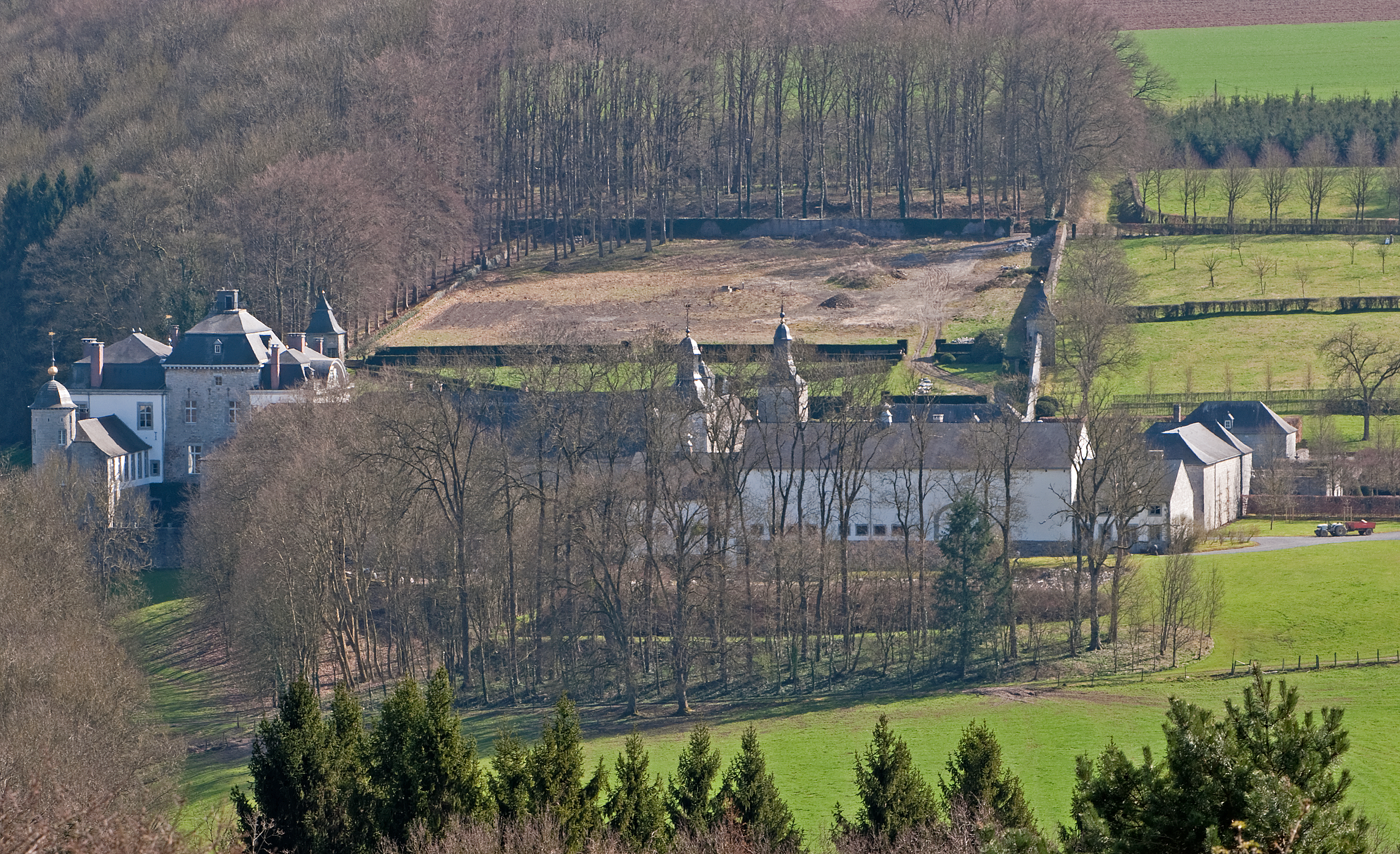

Site information
- Type: Castle
- Owner: private
- Open to the public: no

Location
- Coordinates: 50.454755°N 5.61985°E

Fanson Castle (French: Château de Fanson) is a castle in the village of Xhoris in Ferrières, Liège Province, Wallonia, Belgium.

== See also ==
- List of castles in Belgium
