= Drapery Court of Brussels =

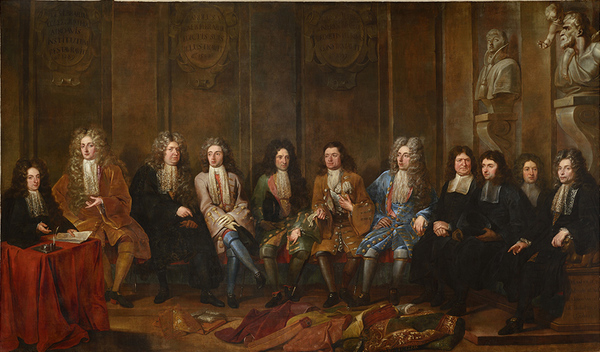
The Secretary, the two Deans and "The Eight" of the Drapery Court in 1699. Painting by Jean van Orley.

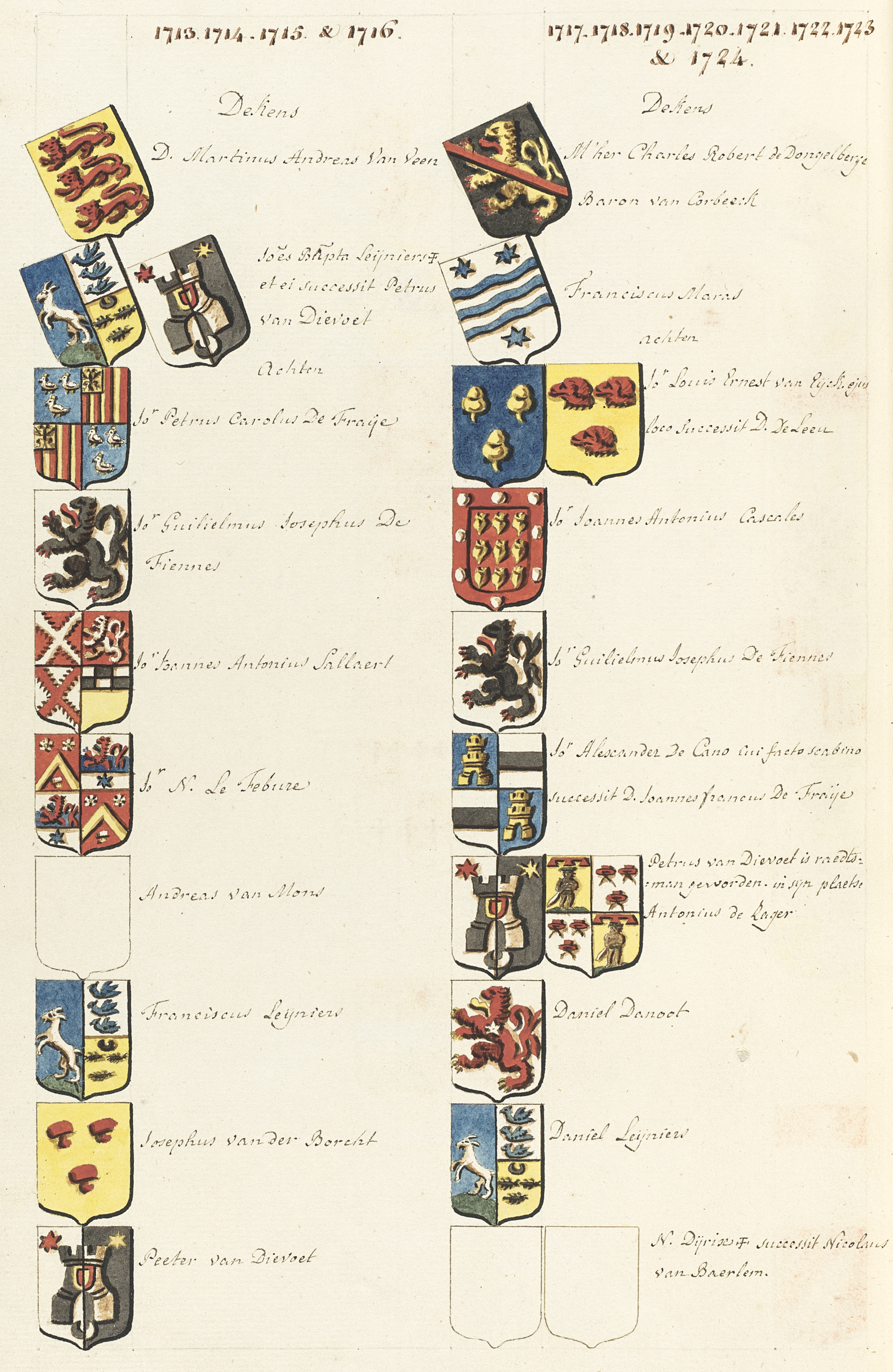
Roll of arms of members of the Drapery Court. (1713–1724)

The Drapery Court (French: Gilde Drapière or Tribunal de la Draperie; Dutch: Lakengilde), also called the Chamber of Commerce in the 18th century, was one of the oldest and most influential institutions of the City of Brussels during the Ancien Régime and was abolished during the French occupation of Brussels.

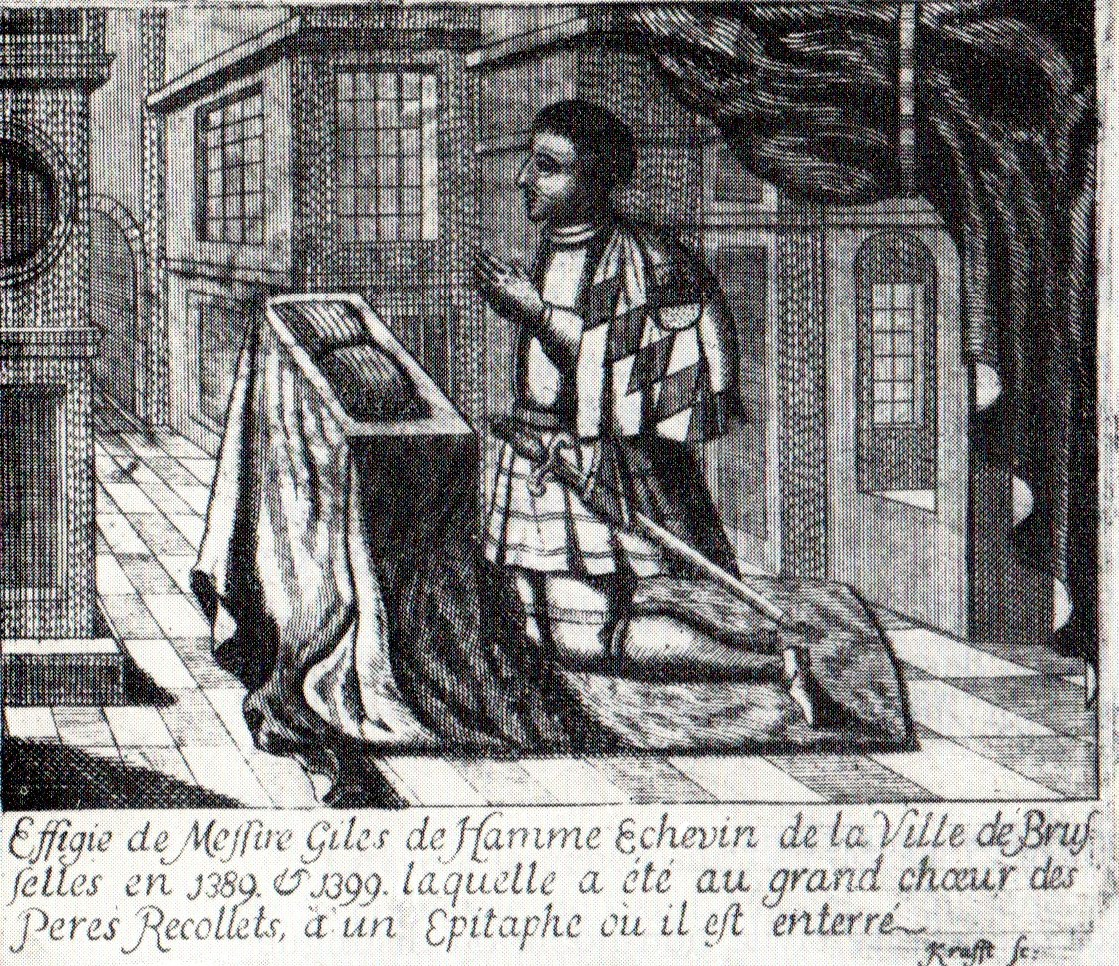
Gilles van Hamme, admitted to the House of Roodenbeke in 1376, alderman in 1389 and 1399, Dean of the Drapery Court in 1378 and 1392.

== History and institution ==
The Drapery Court, whose origins go back to the 12th century, was above all a judicial court and a chamber of commerce which was originally intended to regulate the trade and manufacture of sheets and to check their quality. This Court sat three times a week on Tuesdays, Thursdays, and Saturdays.

The Gilde was led by two judges called Deans (French: Doyens) who were assisted by eight assessors called The Eight (French: Les Huit, Dutch: De Acht) or the Octovirs. During the Angevin regime, the Deans and The Eight were appointed intendants and aldermen of the chamber of commerce. Until the revolution of 1421, they were all chosen among the Seven Noble Houses of Brussels, and after, one Dean and four of The Eight were chosen from among the Guilds.

In the 15th century, the Court named three valets to seal the sheets of the cloths whose quality it controlled, as well as two receivers, five controllers and a cloth sealer on of the ones on sale on the Grand-Place/Grote Markt at the Halle aux Pains. It also named the weigher of the wool and the measurer of the potash (intended to wash the wools).

== Confusion ==
The Drapery Court, which was a kind of commercial court, should not be confused with the Drapers' Guild. While most of the judges who belonged to this tribunal had nothing to do with the trade of clothiers, they were, indeed, chosen among the Noble Houses, not able to exercise any profession or trade, and among the members of the Guilds belonging to various corporations.

== See also ==
- Guilds of Brussels
- Seven Noble Houses of Brussels
- Bourgeois of Brussels
- List of Mayors of the City of Brussels

== Bibliography ==
- Henne and Wauters, Histoire de la ville de Bruxelles, Volume 4.
- Antoine André de Cuyper, Coutumes du pays et duché de Brabant, Commission royale pour la publication des anciennes lois et ordonnances de la Belgique, Brussels, 1869 p. 226 : Juridiction du Magistrat avec ceux de la chambre de commerce dite Lakengulde.
- Roger de Peuter, Brussel in de achttiende eeuw : sociaal-economische structuren, Brussels, 1999, p. 260.
- Louis-Prosper Gachard, Documents inédits concernant les troubles de la Belgique, 1838, volume 1, p. 198.
- Liste des doyens de la Gilde drapière de 1325 à 1688, published in the revue Les Lignages de Bruxelles, 1992, n° 129-130, pages 25 and following.
- Armorial de la Gilde Drapière, Bibliothèque Royale, Cabinet des Manuscrit, ms. G123.

== Authority ==
Content in this edit is translated from the existing French Wikipedia article at fr:Gilde drapière de Bruxelles; see its history for attribution.
