= Aegidius Gelenius =

Aegidius Gelenius (10 June 1595 – 24 August 1656) was a German clergyman and historian who worked as historiographer to the Archbishop-Elector of Cologne, Ferdinand of Bavaria. He had at his disposal some earlier sources that are not in existence today, including a life of Herman of Scheda.

He developed a late hatching system for heraldry but it did not gain popularity.

== Life ==
Gelenius was born in Kempen and was the brother of Johannes Gelenius. He began his studies with the Jesuits in Mainz in 1614 and continued them in Italy. He spent about five years in the Collegium Germanicum in Rome doing philosophical, ecclesiastical, dogmatical and "archaeological" studies. He was consecrated in 1616 in the Lateran church and was awarded the degree Bachelor of Theology from Perugia University. In 1621, he became a canon of the St. Andreas Closter in Cologne and was promoted to the Cologne department of theology in 1623 where he obtained a licentiate degree in theology. Between 1625 and 1631, he served in St. Christoph church. In 1645, the prince Wolfgang Wilhelm requested him to take up the office of canonical visitor for the ecclesial institutions of the Duchy of Berg with a brief to improve their efficiencies. In 1647 he was elected scholaster of St. Andreas, became the supervisor of the Cologne archbishopric in 1650, appointed the auditor of the Cologne Nunciature in 1653, and before his death in 1656 he was consecrated as auxiliary bishop of Osnabrück.

== Works ==
His brother Johannes (1585-1631) was also a renowned ecclesiastical personality besides being an outstanding Cologne historian who began to put together some valuable historical sources about the history of the archdiocese of Cologne in his bid to write a comprehensive book but could not complete as he met with a premature death. But his brother Aegidius promised to complete his work when he was on the deathbed and accordingly Aegidius left his job and began to concentrate only on the work that his departed brother began.

After spending almost 15 years ”day in day out”, he put together a 30-volume historic work from original sources. Each volume deals with a distinguished topic like temples, archives, medals, paintings, the university etc. But even after his resignation from the St. Christoph church, Gelenius could not work quiet properly, as he was in high demand from many quarters. He had been getting frequent requests from different aristocrats to elevate the Catholic religion. He wrote the biographies of the dukes of Guelders and Cleves and the counts of Mark, the Limburg Chronicle, the story of Jacob of Baden, and the chronicle of the Counts of Thüringia, etc. He named these collections as Farrago diplomatum et notationum pro historia. However, on the occasion of the 1744th inventory, three volumes (12, 19, and 23) were missing or were under the ownership of other institutions already, and of these, the volume No. 12 contained the manuscript De magnitudine Coloniae. A small section of volume 12 is quoted by Godfrey Henschen in the Acta Sanctorum under the entry for Saint Alban (June 22nd).

== Gelenius in heraldry ==
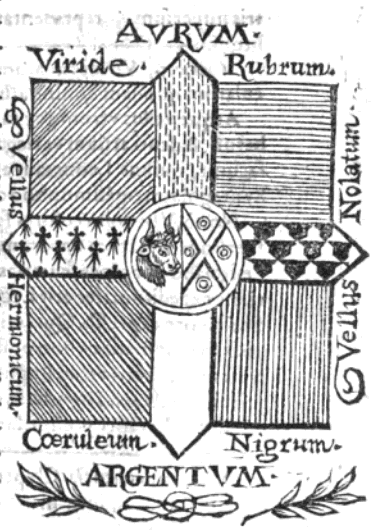
The Hatching table of Gelenius (De admiranda sacra et civili magnitudine Coloniae... Cologne, 1645. p. 121)

His main work was De admiranda sacra et civili magnitudine Coloniae... published in 1645, which dealt largely with the city's church history, sacred monuments and holy relics. Today this is the only source of information on some events because documents have been lost. In 1644, he sought permission from the city council to publish this work, which was printed the following year with imprimaturs from Cologne, Dusseldorf and Kempen.

Gelenius was influenced by Petra Sancta; they met several times in Cologne. Gelenius also studied the coat of arms and antiquities of the Rhenish nobility in the territory neighboring the Low Countries. He put together a Rhenish armorial book arranged according to the charges. Philipp Jakob Spener repeatedly quotes from Gelenius in his 1690 work titled Insignium Theoria. However, Gelenius's hatching system is identical only at two points with Petra Sancta, but totally the same as the one of Christophe Butkens.
