= House of Steenweeghs =

Steenweeghs
- Place of origin: Brussels

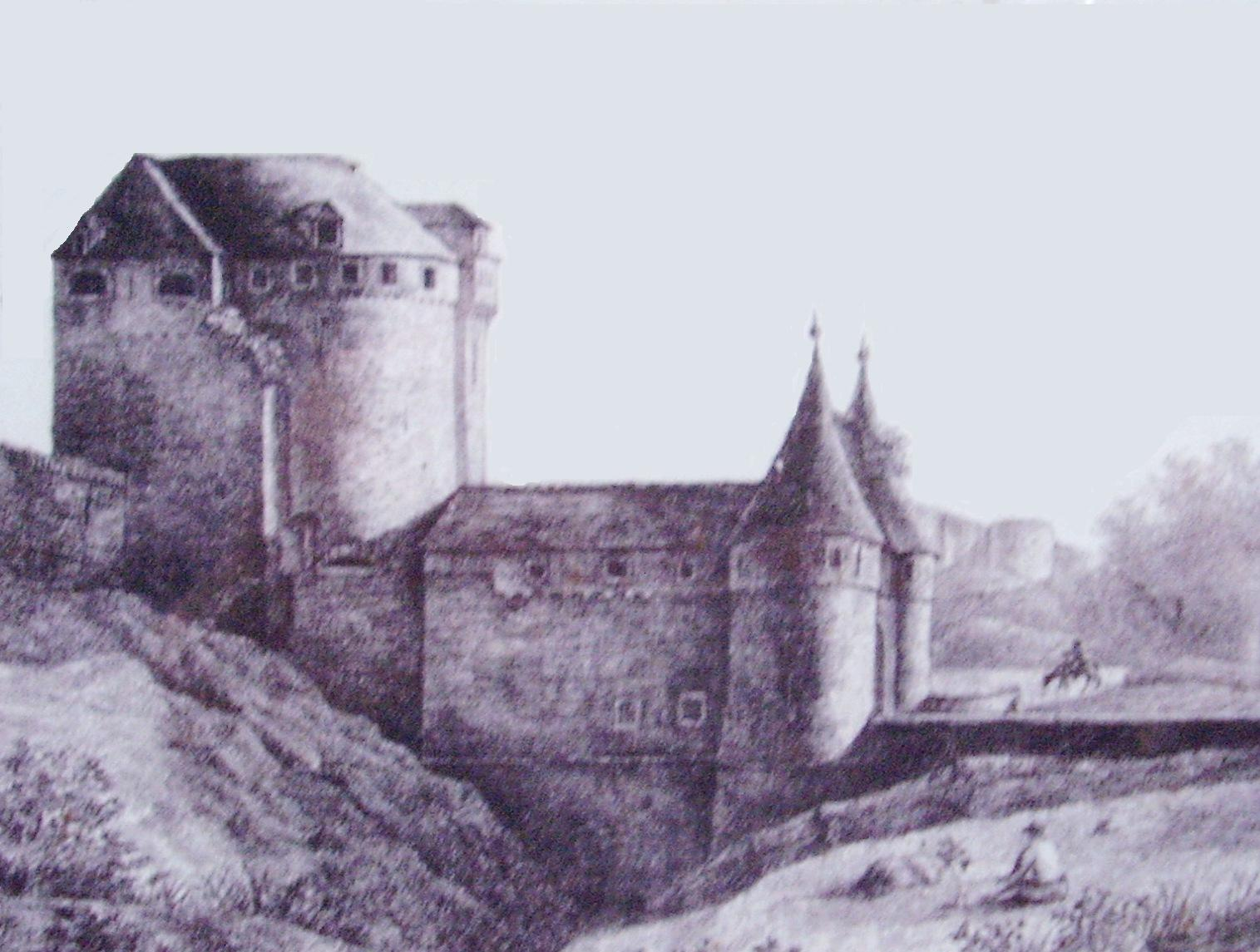
The Leuven Gate in 1612

The House of Steenweeghs or Steenweeghs Lineage (French: Lignage Steenweeghs) is one of the Seven Noble Houses of Brussels, along with Roodenbeke, Sleeus, Serhuyghs, Sweerts, Serroelofs, and Coudenberg.

The House of Steenweeghs was charged in 1383 with the defence of the Leuven Gate, and was assisted as of 1422 by the Nation of St John.

== Escutcheon ==
Gules (Brussels), five escallops in a cross.

== The Seven Noble Houses of Brussels ==
The Seven Noble Houses of Brussels (French: Sept lignages de Bruxelles, Dutch: Zeven geslachten van Brussel) were the seven families of Brussels whose descendants formed the city's patrician class, to whom special privileges were granted until the end of the Ancien Régime. Together with the Guilds of Brussels, they formed the city's bourgeoisie.

== Notable people ==
Name	Birth	Death	Admitted	Known for	Ref.
Philippe de l'Espinoy	1552	1633	3 February 1590	Historian, genealogist and heraldist.	

== See also ==
History of Brussels
