= Christophe Butkens =

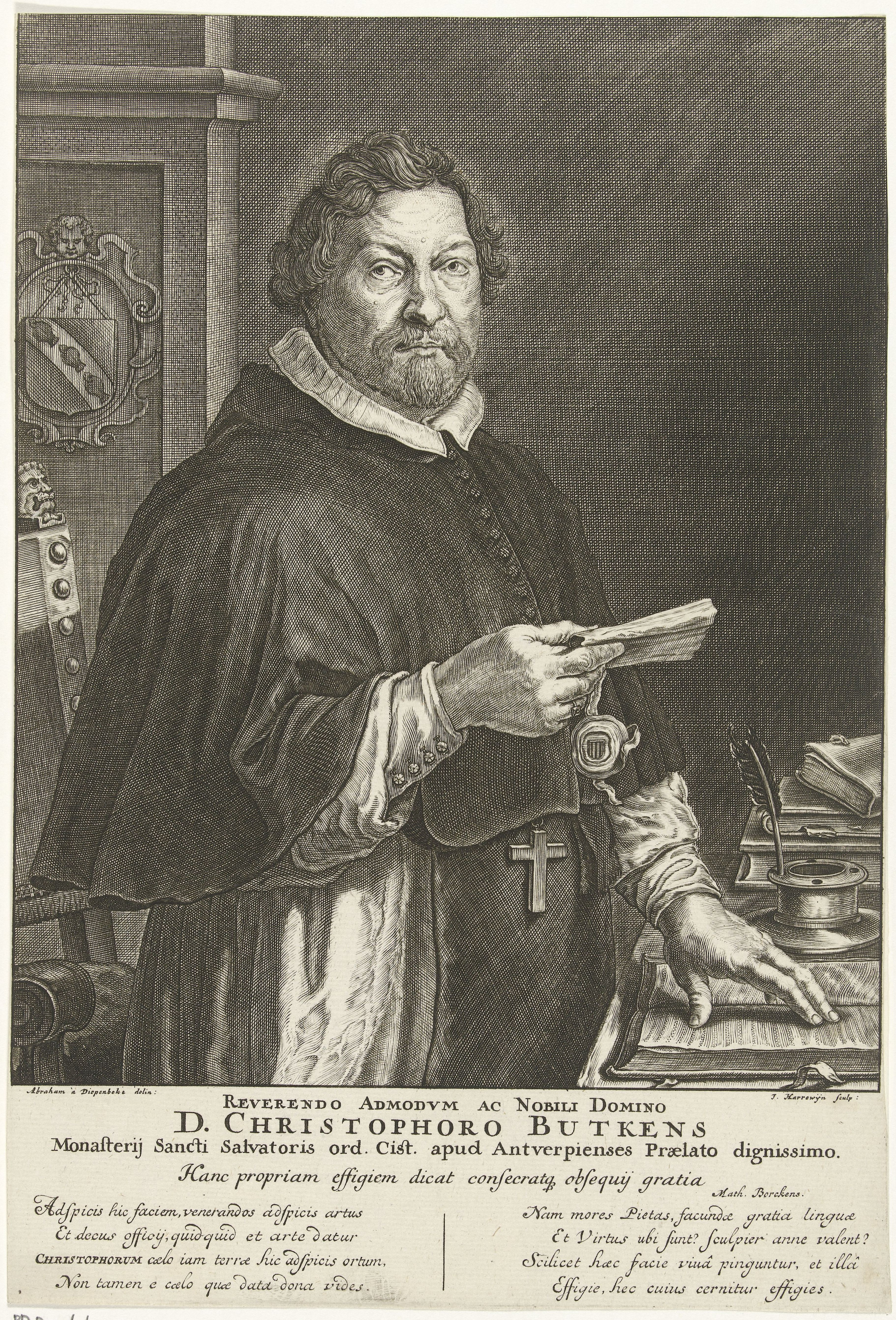

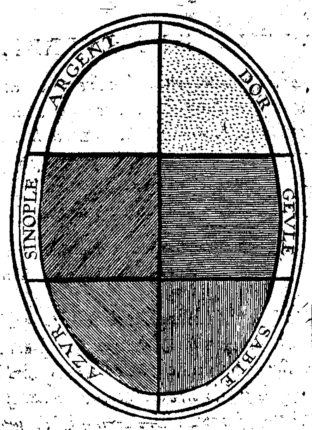
Enlarged hatching table of Butkens

Christophe Butkens (1590–1650) was a Cistercian abbot from Antwerp, a historian and a genealogist who developed a new hatching system.

== Hatching systems ==
Butkens developed his own hatching system but he himself used it in an inconsistent way, leading to misunderstandings. It quickly passed out of use in favour of other systems. His hatching method was published in the book Annales genealogiques de la maison de Lynden (Antwerp, 1626), which has been seen as flagrant in falsifying the van Lynden genealogy, as shown by Baron van Linden in 1891. However, his later work is seen as authentic. According to Philipp Spener some maintained that Butkens was the first to invent a heraldic hatching system, but others gave that honour to Marcus Vulson de la Colombière.

Butkens was one of the two censors (the other being Henricus Calenus) who approved publication of Juan Caramuel Lobkowitz's treatise Declaración Mystica de las Armas de España (Brussels, Lucas van Meerbeeck, 1636), which contains an alternative hatching system.

== Works ==
- Annales genealogiques de la maison de Lynden. Antwerp, 1626
- Trophées tant sacrés que prophanes de la duché de Brabant. Tome I. Contenant l'origine, succession et descendance des ducs et princes de ceste maison avec leurs actions plus signalées, ensemble des genealogies de plusieurs ducs, princes, comtes, barons, seigneurs et nobles, leur vassals et subiects avec les preuves servantes à entiere verification..., Antwerp, 1641. Frontispiece engraved by Mattheus Borrekens after the drawing of Abraham van Diepenbeeck. Another edition: F. C. Butkens, Trophées tant sacrés et profanes du Duché de Brabant. 1724-1726

== See also ==
- Hatching system
- Jan Baptist Zangrius
- Thomas de Rouck
