= Philippe de l'Espinoy =

Philippe de L'Espinoy (1552–1633) of Ghent was a historian, genealogist and heraldist of the Low Countries. On 3 February 1590, he was admitted to the Steenweeghs Lineage, one of the Seven Noble Houses of Brussels.

He served as the commander of a company of Walloon infantry during the reign of Philip II of Spain. He gave up the military career to devote full-time to genealogical studies that led to the publication of the important volume in 1631, which was partly financed by the magistrate of the city of Ghent.

The work contains the genealogical history of the counts of Flanders with a description of the aforesaid country. The number of illustrations in this book counts to a hefty 1,121 escutcheons, standards and seals of armorial bearings on wood, besides 58 copperplate illustrations. There is a full-page engraving with the arms of the Infante Isabelle and a great double-spread engraving representing an assembly of the dignitaries of the Flanders.

The French heraldist Imbert de la Phalecque and his Italian counterpart Goffredo di Crollanza claim that the work of Philippe de l'Espinoy is the first one in which he adopted the hatching system applied in the blazon. However, the hatchings on the arms do not follow any system. The book does not contain any table of hatching. Looking at the numerous pictures of arms in this elaborate work, at first sight they appear to have hatchings. If one however compares these "hatchings" with the descriptions, then one finds out that there is no system in it at all. For instance Gules is alternately indicated by horizontal or vertical or diagonal lines or is left blank. It seems l'Espinoy considered lines and dots merely as a sort of artistic additions which he put in at random.

An earlier book of l’Espinoy in 1628 had Brabantic subjects indicating that the author was also closely connected to the territories where the heraldic hatching system emerged initially. Besides the Flemish subjects of the book it shows a close connection between the French and Brabant-Flemish territories, as also the fact that in 1595 Petrus Zangrius also published a book in Douai.
