= Thomas de Rouck =

Steward and mayor of Bergen op Zoom

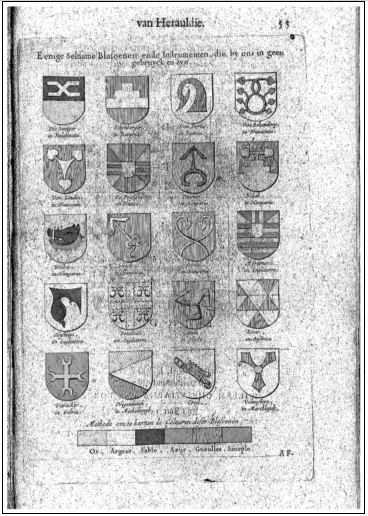
Hatching table of de Rouck (1645)

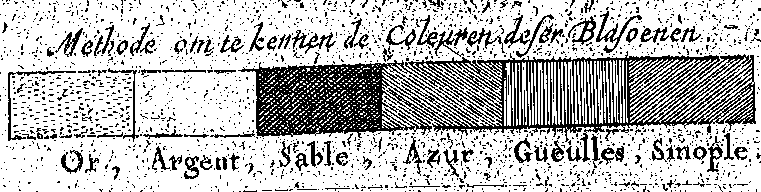
Enlarged hatching table of de Rouck

Thomas de Rouck (baptized January 21, 1592, Bergen op Zoom - September 5, 1660, Bergen op Zoom) was a steward and later the mayor of his native town Bergen op Zoom. De Rouck developed a late hatching system (1645), but failed to make a serious cut.

The engravings, according to his 1673 work, were possibly made by his relatives. The portrait of the vicar Lambertus de Rycke (†1658) seen in the book was engraved by W[illem] de Rouck. F. J. van Ettro maintained, he was familiar with the hatching system of Zangrius. However, it seems more evident that even Butkens might have known Zangrius’ system despite his hatching table being radically different from that of Zangrius because he also applied the same oval escutcheon in his hatching table similar to what Zangrius did in his system.

== Works ==
- Thomas de Rouck, Den Nederlandtschen Herauld ofte Tractaet van wapenen, en politycken Adel. Amsterdam, 1645 Digitized. The hatching table to be found in the second part, page 55.
- Thomas de Rouck, Adelyk tooneel of historische beschrijvinge van allerley trappen van adeldom en ridderl. ordens. Amsterdam, 1673
