= Christian Samuel Theodor Bernd =

Christian Samuel Theodor Bernd (April 12, 1775 in Meseritz – August 26, 1854 in Bonn) was a German linguist and heraldist, one of the founders of scientific heraldry.

Bernd studied theology at the Jena University. Between 1807 and 1811 he served as editor of the dictionary of German language, then he was a librarian in Breslau. He was the professor of diplomatics, sphragistics and heraldry at the Bonn University from 1822 and was one of the founders of modern scientific heraldry.

Bernd introduced hatching for some additional tinctures such as Umbra, Rotgelb, Stahlblau and Blutfarbe.

== Works ==
- Allgemeine Schriftenkunde der sogenannten Wappenwissenschaft. I-II. Bonn, 1830
- Das Wappenwesen der Griechen und Römer. Bonn, 1841
- Die Hauptstücke der Wappenwissenschaft. Bonn, 1841-1849
- Wappenbuch der preußischen Rheinprovinz. Bonn, 1835, supplement Bonn, 1842
- Handbuch der Wappenwissenschaft. Leipzig, 1856

== See also ==
- Hatching system
