= Eucharius Gottlieb Rink =

The portrait of professor Rink, a sketch by Bernhard Vogel

Eucharius Gottlieb Rink (August 11, 1670 – February 9, 1745) was a German jurist, heraldist, numismatician, and imperial counsellor. His name may also be spelt as Rinck, Rinckius, or Rinkius. He was a member of the Rink von Dorstig family, which obtained a title of nobility in the 15th century.

Starting in 1687, he studied philosophy, political history, and state law at Leipzig University. He then studied at the University of Altdorf, where he became the professor of state law in 1707. In 1739, he became a member of the Prussian Royal Academy of Sciences. He had remarkable collections of coins and coats of arms. Rink introduced hatching (1726) for the tincture gray (Eisen) and carnation (Naturfarbe). He studied the old seals as a source of heraldry and claimed that the coat of arms originated in Germany.

== Works ==
J. J. Mandata Cum Et Sine Clausula. Eucharius Gottlib Rink. – Altdorfii Noricorum : Meyer, 1697

De Carrociis : Ex Iure Militari Medii Aevi. Eucharius Gottlib Rink. – Altdorfii Noribergensium : Kohles, 1700

De Veteris Nvmismatis Potentia Et Qvalitate Lucubratio : occasione Rubricæ Codicis de eodem Argumento; sive Cognitio Totivs Rei Nvmariae Ad Intelligentiam Ivris Accommodata; Accessit Dissertatio Ivridica De Nvmo Vnico, Cum multis aliis cognitioni Numorum conducentibus. Eucharius Rink. – Lipsiae, 1701

Leopolds des Großen, Römischen Käysers, wunderwürdiges Leben und Thaten : aus geheimen Nachrichten eröffnet. Eucharius Gottlieb Rink. – Leipzig : Fritsch, 1708

Leopolds des Großen, Römischen Käysers, wunderwürdiges Leben und Thaten : aus geheimen Nachrichten eröffnet. Eucharius Gottlieb Rink. Leipzig, Bey Thomas Fritsch, I-II. 1708

Ludewigs des XIV. Königes in Franckreich wunderwürdiges Leben oder Steigen und Fall. Eucharius Gottlieb Rinck. – Franckfurt : Riegel, 1709

Das verwirrte Pohlen : In einer genauen Gegeneinanderhaltung der Geschichte des vorigen und jetzigen schwedischen Kriegs vorgestellet ...; Diesem ist beigefügt eine Beschreibung aller polnischen und litthauischen Hertzoge und Könige nebst des Landes Städte und Provinzen. Eucharius Gottlieb Rink. – Franckfurth : Riegel, 1711

Analecta Historica De Origine Electorvm / Proponvnt Evcharivs Gottlib Rink Et Jacob Gottlib Linck Anno CICICCCXII Die XIV Maii. Rink, Eucharius Gottlieb és Linck, Jacob Gottlieb (1693–1761) AltorfI Noribergensivm Typis Kohlesii Acad. Typ., 1712

Josephs des Sieghafften Röm. Käysers Leben und Thaten : In zwey theile abgefasset, und mit bildnißen gezieret. Eucharius Gottlieb Rink. – Cölln, 1712

Josephs des Sieghafften Röm. Käysers Leben und Thaten : In zwey theile abgefasset, und mit bildnißen gezieret. Eucharius Gottlieb Rink, Cölln, I-II. 1712

Leopolds des Großen, Römischen Käysers, wunderwürdiges Leben und Thaten : aus geheimen Nachrichten eröffnet. Eucharius Gottlieb Rink. – Aufs neue gedr. u. um vieles verm. – Cölln, 1713

Leopolds des Großen, Römischen Käysers, wunderwürdiges Leben und Thaten : aus geheimen Nachrichten eröffnet. Eucharius Gottlieb Rink, Cölln, I-IV. 1713

Dissertatio Academica De Speculo Saxonico Fonte Iur. Sax. Communis Vulgo vom Sachsen-Spiegel. Eucharius Gottlib Rink. – Altorfii : Kohles, 1718

Dissertatio Academica De Speculo Saxonico Fonte Iur. Sax. Communis Vulgo vom Sachsen-Spiegel. Eucharius Gottlib Rink. – Altorfii : Kohles, 1718

De eo quod iustam est circa Galeam. Helmstedt, 1726

2nd edition: De Eo Quod Iustum Est Circa Galeam / Eucharius Gottlib Rink [Präses]; Christoph. Andreas de Im-Hof [Resp.]. Altorfii Noric. : Grebner, 1742

Dissertatio Iuridica De Clypeorum Ratione Habenda In Feudis Alienandis. Eucharius Gottlib Rink. – Altorfii : Kohles, 1731

Eucharii Gottlib Rinck ... De Imperatoribus Primis Perpetuis Ac Solis Academiarum In Germania Autoribus : Anno M D CC XXIII. Publice Defensa Nunc Vt Multorum Desideriis Satisfiat Adcurate Recusa. Eucharius Gottlib Rinck. – Recusa. – Lipsiae : Trog, 1736

Eucharii Gottlib Rinckii ... Commentatio Iuridica De Clypeorum Ratione Habenda In Feudis Alienandis : Daß man in Veräusserung der Lehngüter auf die Heerschilde zu sehen habe. Eucharius Gottlib Rinckius. – [S.l.], 1746

Bibliotheca Rinckiana : seu supellex librorum ... qvos per omnia scientiarum genera collegit ... Eucharius Gottlieb Rinck ... cum præfatione Adami Friderici Glafey ... accedit index locupletissimus. Adamus Fridericus Glafey. – Lipsiae : Fritsch, 1747
