= Hatching (heraldry) =

System of patterns used in heraldry

The coat of arms of the German municipality of Adlkofen in hatched and coloured versions.

Hatching (sometimes called hachure, from the French word) is a conventional system for monochrome denotation of heraldic armory, whereby the tinctures (colours) are represented by dots and lines. This technique is employed in cases where colours, for either aesthetic, practical or economic reasons are not reproduced – e.g. on surfaces such as woodcuts or engravings, seals and coins.

Several systems of hatchings were developed during the Renaissance as an alternative to tricking, the earlier method of indicating heraldic tinctures by use of written abbreviations. The present day hatching system was developed during the 1630s by Silvester Petra Sancta and Marcus Vulson de la Colombière. Some earlier hatching methods were also developed, but did not come into wide use.

Tricking is an alternative method which has the same purpose as hatching.

== Conventional systems ==
Historical and present conventional hatching systems
Tincture Time period		Metals		Colours					Stains			Modern		
Tincture Time period		Argent (white)	Or (gold)	Gules (red)	Sable (black)	Azure (blue)	Vert (green)	Purpure (purple)	Murrey (mulberry)	Sanguine (blood-red)	Tenné (tawny)	Orange (orange)	Rose (pink)	Bleu celeste (light blue)
Present systems	Conventional											—N/a	—N/a	—N/a
Present systems	Extended conventional								—N/a	—N/a			—N/a	
Present systems	Unicode charts								—N/a	—N/a				
Historical systems	Jan Baptist Zangrius 1600							—N/a	—N/a	—N/a	—N/a	—N/a	—N/a	—N/a
Historical systems	Jacob Franquart 1623							—N/a	—N/a	—N/a	—N/a	—N/a	—N/a	—N/a
Historical systems	Christophe Butkens 1626							—N/a	—N/a	—N/a	—N/a	—N/a	—N/a	—N/a
Historical systems	Silvester Petra Sancta 1634							—N/a	—N/a	—N/a	—N/a	—N/a	—N/a	—N/a
Historical systems	"Caramuel" 1636								—N/a		—N/a	—N/a	—N/a	—N/a
Historical systems	Silvester Petra Sancta 1638, Marcus Vulson de la Colombière 1639								—N/a	—N/a	—N/a	—N/a	—N/a	—N/a
Historical systems	Juan Caramuel y Lobkowitz 1639–1642							—N/a	—N/a	—N/a	—N/a	—N/a	—N/a	—N/a
Historical systems	Thomas de Rouck 1645							—N/a	—N/a	—N/a	—N/a	—N/a	—N/a	—N/a
Historical systems	Aegidius Gelenius 1645							—N/a	—N/a	—N/a	—N/a	—N/a	—N/a	—N/a
Historical systems	Charles Segoing 1654								—N/a	—N/a	—N/a	—N/a	—N/a	—N/a
Historical systems	Filippo Bonanni 1711								—N/a	—N/a		—N/a	—N/a	—N/a

== Genesis ==
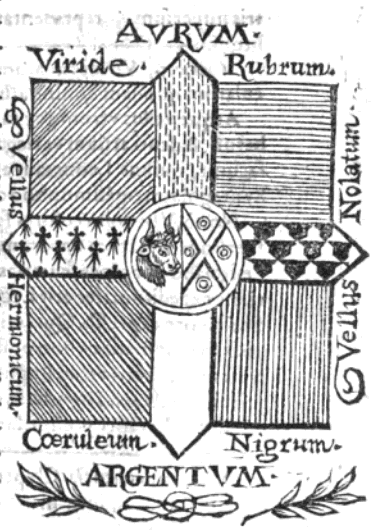
Hatching table of Aegidius Gelenius, published 1645

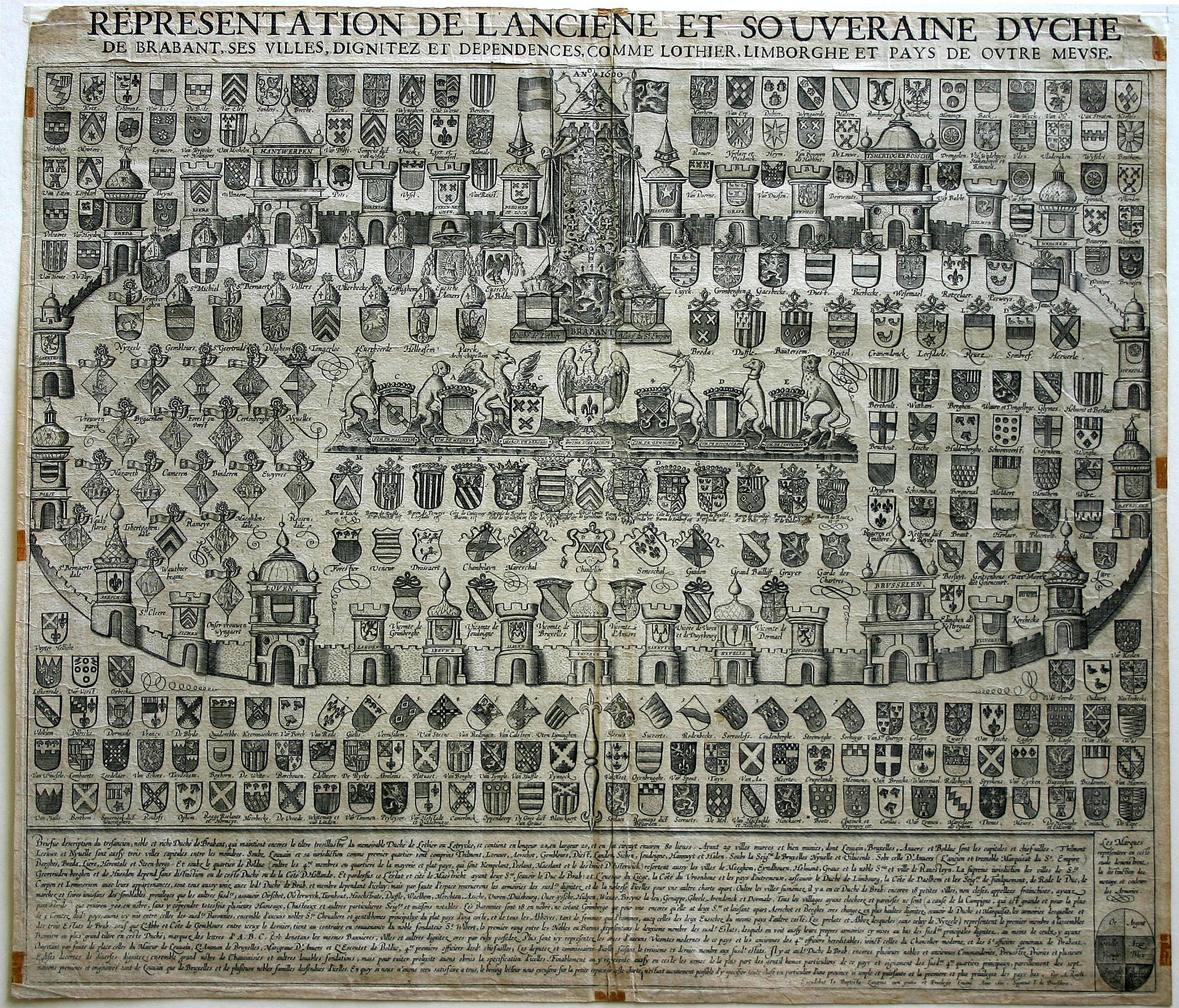
The original of the armorial chart of Jan Baptist Zangrius from the Helmond archive (1600)

Hatching developed as a method of screening used by Renaissance painters. For copperplate engravers and artists such as Zangrius and Franquart, it served as a natural method to designate heraldic tinctures. Copper plate engravers faced difficulties producing coloured illustrations. The first tests of colour copperplate engravings were done by François Perrier around the middle of the 17th century. According to some views, however, multi-coloured copperplate engravings were invented by Abraham Bosse, as described in his 1645 treatise.

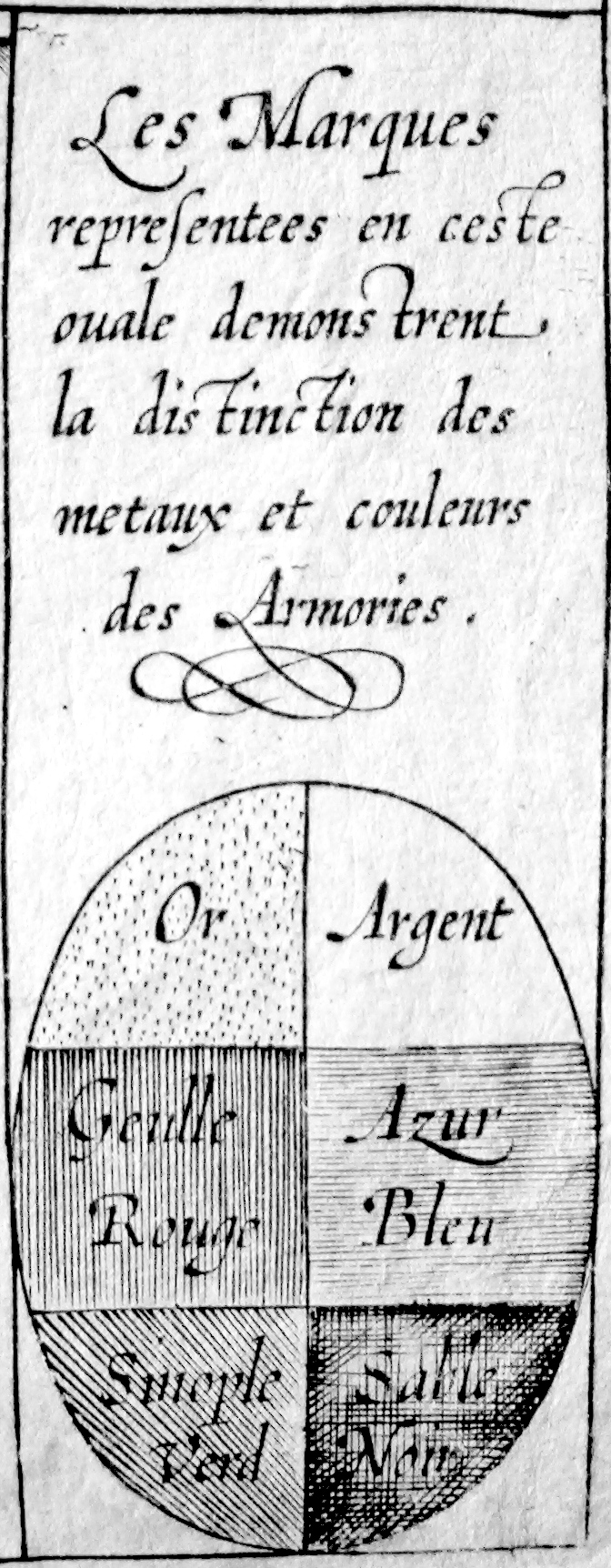
Hatching table of Zangrius (1600)

Heralds did not like hatching, and the College of Arms gave preference to tricking even beyond the 17th century. Tricking was a simpler and quicker way than hatching to designate the tinctures. Otto Titan von Hefner maintained that the first traces of hatching on the woodcuts began during the 15th and 16th centuries. Both tricking and hatching were applied by the Benedictine monk, philologist and historian Vincenzo Borghini (1515–1580). He drew a difference between metals and colours of arms on his woodcuts by leaving the places for metals blank; similarly, all colours were hatched the same way the colour vert is today. Besides this, tinctures were designated in the fields and on the ordinaries and charges by tricking: R for rosso (gules), A for azure, N for nigro (sable), G for gialbo (Or), and B for biancho (argent). Vert was not represented among his works.

Painting and graphics advanced greatly in the Low Countries during the 15th–18th centuries. For this reason, different hatching methods emerged in the system of heraldry in these territories (mainly in the Duchy of Brabant), such as the methods of Zangrius (1600), Franquart (1623), Butkens (1626), and de Rouck (1645). The four other authors to produce hatching systems in the 17th century – de la Colombière, Petra Sancta, Gelenius, and Lobkowitz – also had close connection with heraldists and artists in these territories.

The earliest hatching system was developed by Jan Baptist Zangrius, a copperplate engraver, publisher, typographer and bookseller from Leuven, in 1600. The hatching systems of Petra Sancta and de la Colombière differed from Zangrius's method only in their hatchings of the colour Sable.

=== Dispute of Petra Sancta and de la Colombière ===
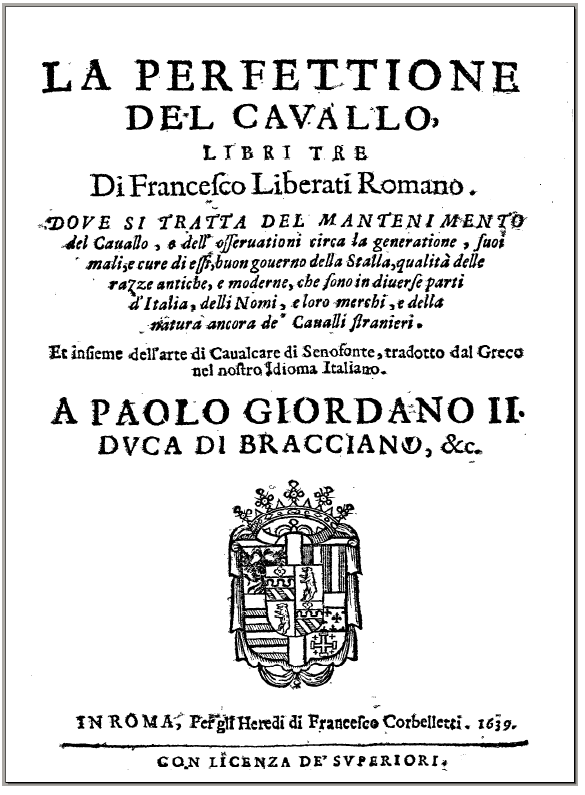
Example of hatching on the title page of a book printed in 1639 by Francesco Corbelletti

The primacy of developing a hatching method belongs undoubtedly to Zangrius. In comparison to his system, Petra Sancta and de la Colombière made only minor changes to Zangrius' system such as different hatching for the colour Sable. It seems that de la Colombière preceded Petra Sancta and the armorial chart of Zangrius published in French could possibly be known to him pretty well. The artists from the Spanish Low Countries (where by all probability the heraldic hatching systems were invented), that is to say from the neighbouring territories to France, visited Paris very often.

Only some fragmental data remains about the life of Marcus Vulson de la Colombière. He visited Paris in 1618, but by all probability, until 1635 he was staying in Grenoble as he was a royal counselor in the Dauphiné parliament. He also published a book in the spirit of the Gallicanism in Geneva that year. Colombière's ideas suited the king's taste too, as a result he departed Grenoble and settled in Paris, where he devoted his entire energy to study heraldry. His next book was published in Paris in 1638. He had wide-ranging correspondence with the most renowned heraldists of his time. For this reason, it could perhaps be concluded that de la Colombière was right in claiming the title of the inventor of the hatching system, and accusing Petra Sancta of copying his method and incorrectly publishing it in his 1638 work (Tesserae gentilitiae, Rome 1638), one year before the same hatching system was published by de la Colombière (Recueil de plusieurs pièces et figures d'armoiries..., Paris 1639). However, the earlier book of Petra Sancta from 1634 had a hatching table as well. On page 37 of his title La Science Heroїque (1644), Colombière maintains that Petra Sancta simply copied his system without any changes. De la Colombière also mentions the book publishers and copperplate engravers as the users of the hatching system.

Ottfried Neubecker maintains that the hatching system in heraldry was invented by de la Colombière and not Petra Sancta who only popularized the system through his second treatise titled Tesserae gentilitiae, published in 1638. On the other hand, it is also true that Silvester Petra Sancta provided though preliminary, comprehensive studies on his heraldic work in Germany and the Netherlands and that it is very likely that he was acquainted with the idea of hatching and the earlier existing hatching methods from the Dutch engravers before he developed his own hatching system. He was the confessor of the Cardinal Pier Luigi Carafa (1581–1655). Between 1624 and 1634, Petra Sancta stayed with his lord in Cologne where he fought against the rising Protestantism through his sermons and religious discussions, including through two of his emblematic books published in 1634 and 1638, respectively. Later he settled down in Rome and published his famous treatise on heraldry there, but during the late 1620s and the early 1630s he stayed in the Spanish Low Countries and the neighbouring territories. In 1634 he published his first book touching the topic of heraldry, containing a hatching table, and his main heraldic work with a coherent hatching system was published in 1638 in Rome.

=== Contribution of engravers to development ===
According to the data from the Plantin-Moretus archive, the emblems in Petra Sancta's 1634 book were initially prepared by artist-engravers in the service of the Jesuit monks, and then redone by André Pauwels (Andries Pauli, 1600–1639) between December 1631 and June 1634 for Balthasar Moretus (1574–1641). The allegorical title page of this book was prepared by Rubens. Petra Sancta's 1638 book was published by Francesco Corbelletti in Rome.

The woodcuts from one of Corbelletti's publications (Giovanni Antonio Brandi, Cronologia de' sommi pontefici ...., Rome: Francesco Corbelletti, 1627) are good examples of stripping applied for screening. One of the woodcuts (no. 152) in the book even shows a kind of a screening with hatching. Moreover, the arms on the title page of one of Corbelletti's 1639 La perfettione del cavallo (Francesco Liberati,... Rome: Per gli Heredi di Francesco Corbelletti) already use a complete example of heraldic hatching. That means Corbelletti adopted the heraldic hatching system in the very next year after Petra Sancta's 1638 system. If we consider the time needed to prepare the engravings and the approval by the censure, Corbelletti must have known Petra Sancta's system even before 1638.

Thus it is obvious that Petra Sancta got the model for his system from the illustrators and publishers of his books in the Low Countries. It is possible that these engravers also knew at least two earlier hatching systems: Zangrius' in 1600 and Francquart's in 1623. The techniques might have even been carried forward by the guilds of engravers one after another. Certainly, Petra Sancta must have at least held consultations with the engravers who were preparing illustrations for his books to explain his concept or to develop a coherent method to designate tinctures by mutual agreement.

Designation of tinctures by hatching requires copperplate engravings, as the tiny areas in the escutcheons need lines more closely spaced than woodcuts can produce. And copperplate engraving was the most developed form of hatching in the Low Countries, especially in Antwerp, while until the 1630s it was almost unknown in some other countries, including Paris. So heraldic hatching was developed as a result of the cooperation between heraldists and copperplate engravers and artists.

=== Other systems ===
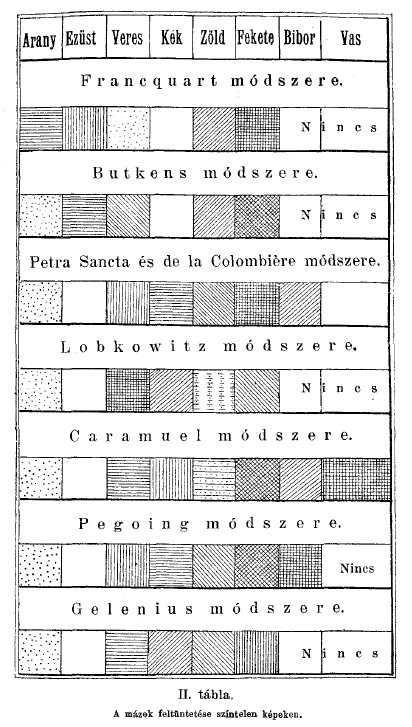
Comparison of hatching systems, published by Oszkár Bárczay in Budapest, 1897 (n.b.:'Pegoing' is a typographical error for 'Segoing'. Colors in Hungarian: gold, silver, red, blue, green, black, purple, iron.)

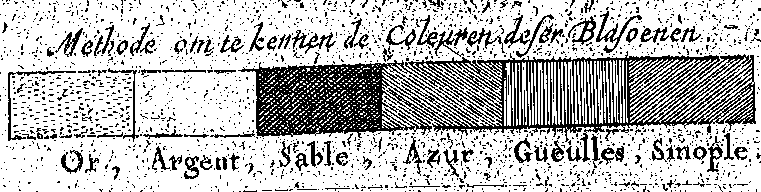
Hatching table of Thomas de Rouck (1645)

The French heraldist Imbert de la Phalecque and his Italian counterpart Goffredo di Crollanza claimed that the work of Philippe de l'Espinoy was the first one that adopted the hatching system applied in the blazon. His two-volume book was published in Douai in 1631 and in 1632 respectively. (A facsimile of l’Espinoy's book titled Recherche des antiquités et noblesse de Flandre was published in 1972.) This city, now in France, was then part of Flanders. The illustrations in this book include 1,121 escutcheons, standards and seals of armorial bearings, on wood, besides 58 copperplate illustrations that at first sight appear to have hatchings. If one however compares these "hatchings" with the descriptions, then one finds out that there isn't any system in it at all. For instance Gules is alternately indicated by horizontal or vertical or diagonal lines or is left blank. It seems l'Espinoy considered lines and dots merely as a sort of artistic additions which he put in at random. There is no hatching table at all.

Most other known hatching systems also originated in the Low Countries. The tiny hatching table of the above-mentioned Jacob Franquart, to be found in his Pompa funebris Alberti Pii Austriaci (1623), was the earliest hatching method after Zangrius. The Cistercian abbot from Antwerp and historian and genealogist Christophe Butkens also developed his own system, but it was used by him in an inconsequent way which led to the misunderstandings and the resultant sudden disappearance of this system. The hatching table of Thomas de Rouck was radically different from that of Zangrius. Aegidius Gelenius was one of the most respected Cologne historians of his time. He developed a late hatching system but it did not gain popularity. Gelenius was deeply influenced by Petra Sancta and both the men met personally several times in Cologne. Gelenius also studied the coats of arms and antiquities of the Rhenish nobility in the territory neighboring the Low Countries. However, Gelenius’ hatching system is identical only at two points with Petra Sancta, indicating that he consciously tried to develop an independent system but failed to make a serious cut, or it can also indicate that Petra Sancta's system was not yet fully developed when they met in Cologne. If this is true, it makes certain the primacy of de la Colombière as the inventor of the hatching system.

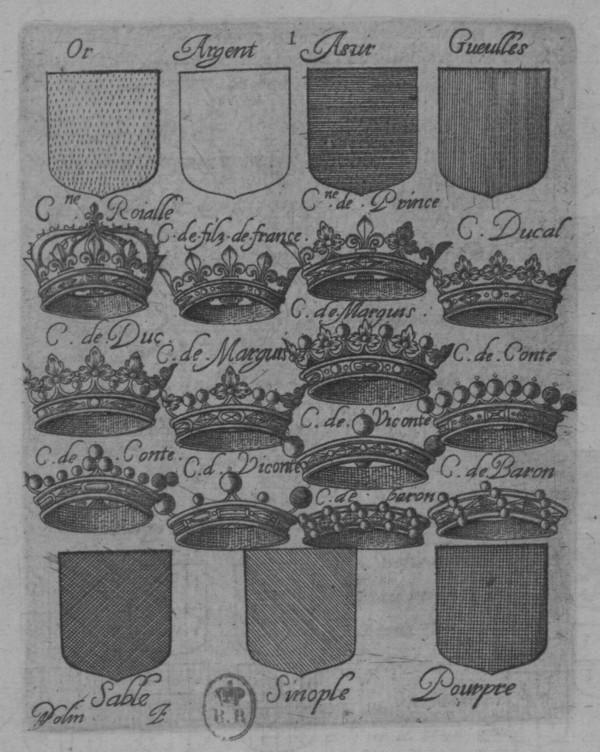
Hatching table of Charles Segoing (1660 edition)

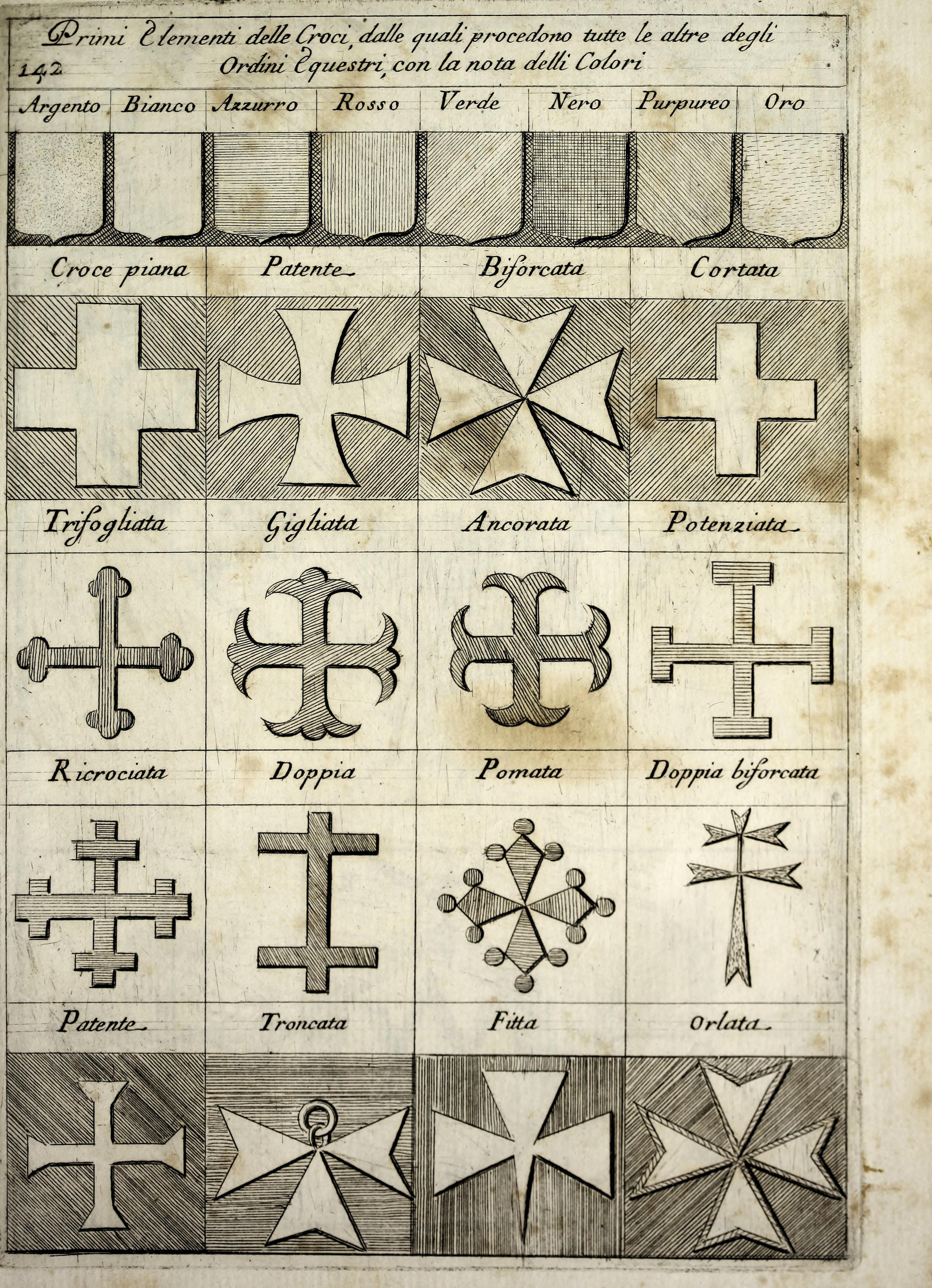
Hatching table of Filippo Bonanni, 1711

The last hatching method was developed by Charles Segoing, a French heraldist and royal historian in 1654 (Armorial universel, contenant les armes des principales maisons de l'Europe. Paris, 1654). His system is similar to the method of Petra Sancta. On the table X of his work, Otto Titan von Hefner published still another system of hatching from 1639, attributed to Lobkowitz. (On page 49, footnote 4 Hefner names his source as Rietstap's Handboek der Wapenkunde, p. 96.) His book titled Philippus Prudens contains as many as 27 engraved portraits of the Portuguese kings, among them several with hatched coat of arms, but there is no hatching table at all. However, in his earlier book from 1636 we can really find a hatching table. (One of the book censors was Christophe Butkens.)

In 1632 Lobkowitz was sent to the Low Countries where he became a renowned preacher and missionary. His first book Steganographia ars orthographia was published in 1636 in Brussels when he was a professor at the Leuven University – the same city where Jan Baptist Zangrius was also active. Here Lobkowitz published a major work titled Theologia Moralis ad prima, eaque clarissima principia reducta printed by Perus Zangrius (Lovanii, typis ac sumptibus Petrus Zangrius, 1645). His book titled Philippus Prudens containing some hatched arms was published in 1639 by Balthasar Moretus in Antwerp. The coats of arms were engraved by Cornelis Galle the Younger, after the drawings of Erasmus Quellinus the Younger (Antwerp, 1607 – Antwerp, 1678), a Flemish Baroque painter, and the engraving of the frontispiece was made by Jacob Neefs (Antwerp, June 3, 1610 – 1660), also after a design by Erasmus Quellinus the Younger.

Christoffel Plantin (1520–1589), grandfather of Balthasar Moretus, set up his printing shop called 'De Gulden Passer' (Golden Compasses) in Antwerp in 1555, publishing both Catholic and Protestant literature. This Frenchman, who fled his native country to Antwerp to escape the persecution during the 1540s, was the best-known printer of his time. Moretus was also a close friend to Rubens who made several illustrations for the company's publications. This company also published a work by Justus Lipsius in 1604 using the same portrait of Lipsius that was engraved by Zangrius in 1601. Zangrius had also some Parisian connections. The Parisian Book Society knew several representatives of a number of leading engravers originating from the Netherlands, for instance, the famous Jodocus Badius (1462–1535) from Asse, and the not-so-famous Johannes Lodoicus Tiletanus (1566–1581) from Tielt. He started off as a corrector at Badius, married the sister-in-law of Badius' daughter Madeleine and became an uncle to Petrus Zangrius.

In 1711, Filippo Bonanni published another hatching system, which has distinct hatching for the tincture Argent and the color white. His marking of the tincture Or is a slightly different as well.

=== Additional tinctures ===
Out of these systems, Otto Titan von Hefner published some further hatching methods at table X of his above cited book, presenting hatching methods for some additional tinctures as well. Some additional tinctures had already appeared in the theory of heraldry in the early 15th century, which were then soon applied in practice. The German jurist and heraldist Eucharius Gottlieb Rink (1670–1746) introduced hatching for the gray (Eisen = iron) and proper (Naturfarbe). These hatchings (natürlichen Farbe, Eisenfarbe) were presented by Gatterer as well. He maintained that the first one is needless, but the second one has its own importance, because he had noticed himself that old armorials produced by heralds, at least in Germany, also made a difference between iron-colour (Eisenfarbe) and the white colour (weisse Farbe), when they omit the term Argent. He also recommended to study the work by Johann David Köhler titled Programma de auctoribus incisurarum, to learn about the origin of hatchings. The German heraldist Christian Samuel Theodor Bernd (1775–1854) introduced hatching for some other tinctures such as Umbra (sienne, earth-color), Rotgelb (yellow-red, orange), Stahlblau (steel blue) and Blutfarbe (sanguine).

Besides the traditional metals, or (gold) and argent (silver), some other metals like copper, lead, bronze, etc. also emerged over the years. Hatching for iron (ferro) and steel (acciaio) were introduced by two Italian heraldists Guelfi Camaini and Goffredo di Crollanza, but these were rarely used.

The heraldic furs (ermine, vair) do not need a special hatching method, as they have a special pattern that is easily recognizable even on the uncoloured illustrations. Nevertheless, there existed two heraldic furs that had their own hatchings. Also, there are in use (mainly in the Czech heraldic literature) furs like zibeline and marten. The colour and hatching for zibeline is the same as the sable (black) tincture, and the colour and hatching of marten is identical with the gules (red) tincture. So, in some countries these tinctures are also held as furs (mainly in the Czech heraldic traditions, but not in real use, and sometimes also in the German heraldry, which is also not in real use today).

Zibeline (in German Zobelfell, in Czech sobol, and in Hungarian coboly) was already used in the ancient times of heraldry. Some minnesängers applied the word Zobelfell for the black tincture, and the arms of the count von Zollern also contained zibeline (Zobelfell). The colour and hatching of marten (in German Marderfell, in Czech kunina, and in Hungarian nyest) is identical with the red (gules) tincture. The origin of the word gules is from the Medieval Latin word gula, which means the mouth of a carnivorous animal, and in some cases the goules are made of the marten fur (one text says goules de martre). Maybe its reddish tint came to the heraldry from the fur of pine marten. In the poem of Konrad von Würzburg we can read kelen rôt (line 985) transformed into modern German as pelzrot. (Furthermore, we can read there phrases like vîz hermelin (405), which is hermelinweiß, and zobel (400) as well.) Though the Webster's Dictionary defines the meaning of pine as a white, yellowish timber and the Cambridge International Dictionary defines it as a timber usually pale in colour, no source, including heraldry textbooks, mentions it in connection with heraldry.

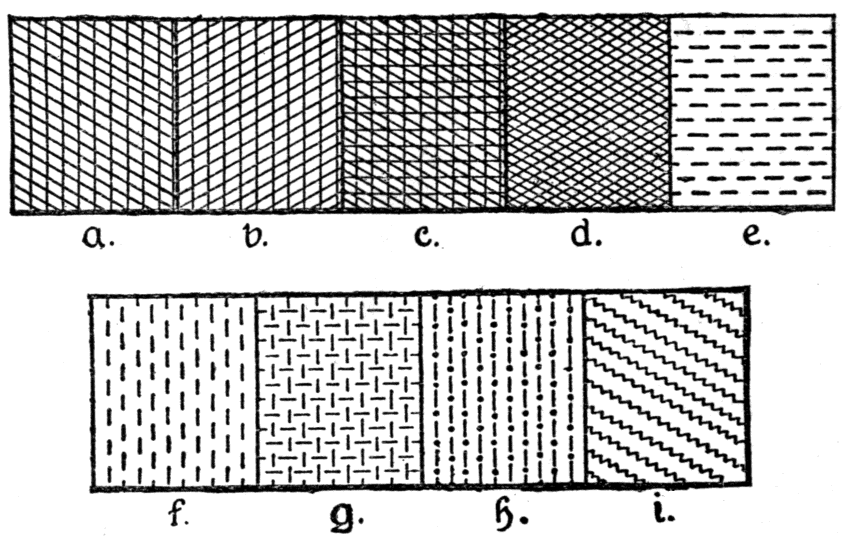
Fig. 36 from Fox-Davies, Complete Guide to Heraldry (1909): Extended hatching scheme used in continental heraldry. a, brown; b, blood-red; c, earth-colour; d, iron-grey; e, water-colour; f, flesh-colour; g, ashen-grey; h, orange; and i, colour of nature.

== Other modern usages ==
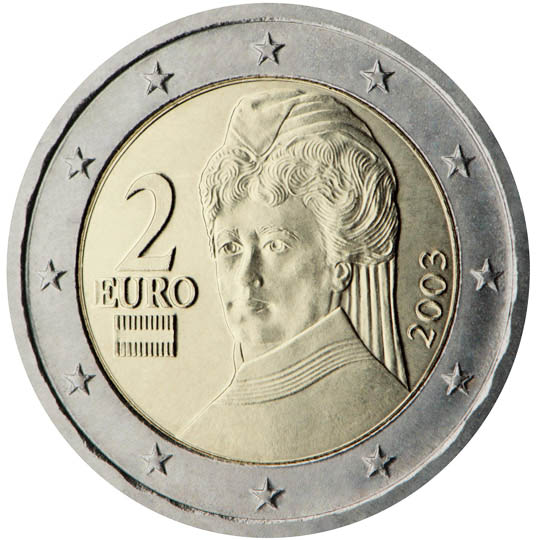
Austrian €2 coin with hatched flag at lower left.

The Austrian flag appears engraved on the Austrian euro coins, with vertical hatching used to indicate the red stripes and no hatching for the white stripe.

The basic Petra Sancta system was adopted in the modern world by industrial engineers as a standard system of colors and hatch patterns for use in planning factories and material handling systems.

The representative glyphs in the Unicode charts use hatching on characters whose color is essential to the character's identity, such as the twelve colored "heart" emoji (in the Miscellaneous Symbols and Pictographs, Supplemental Symbols and Pictographs, and Symbols and Pictographs Extended-A ranges).

Heraldic metal or

U+1F49B 💛 YELLOW HEART in the Unicode reference

Google's emoji, mistakenly representing the yellow heart as hairy

Unicode 6.0 used black and white references, therefore it represented yellow and other colors with the hatching pattern of heraldic or. When developing the yellow heart emoji ⟨💛⟩, Google misinterpreted the dots in Unicode's reference images ⟨⟩ and displayed this emoji as a pink "hairy heart" starting from version 4.4 KitKat. This error was fixed in version 4.4.1 a few months later.

== See also ==
- Screentone, dot patterns as textures in monochrome printing.
