= Limburg Chronicle =

Limburg Chronicle, or Festi Limpurgenses, is the name of a German chronicle that was probably written by Tilemann Elhen von Wolfhagen after 1402. It is a source for the history of the Rhineland between 1336 and 1398, but is perhaps more valuable for the information about German manners and customs, and the old German folksongs and stories which it contains. It has also a certain philological interest.

The chronicle was first published by Johann Friedrich Faust in 1617, and was edited by Arthur Wyss for the Monumenta Germaniae historica. Deutsche Chroniken, Band iv. (Hanover, 1883). See A. Wyss, Die Limburger Chronik untersucht (Marburg, 1875).
