= Marcus Vulson de la Colombière =

French heraldist, historian and poet

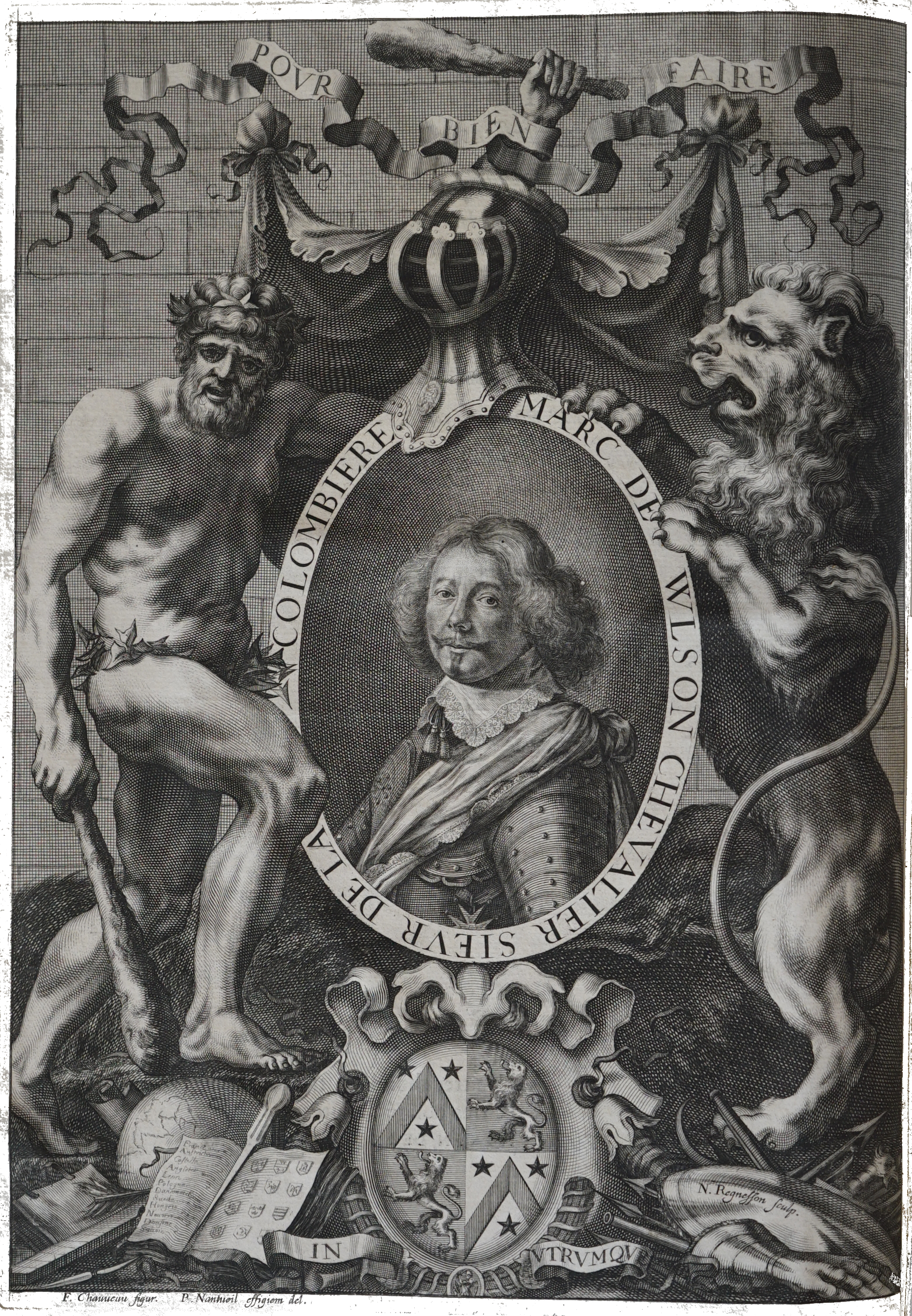
Portrait of Vulson de la Colombière from his book La science Héroïque (Paris, 1644). Engraved by Robert Nanteuil after a drawing by François Chauveau.

Marcus Vulson de la Colombière (died 1658) or Sieur de la Colombière was a French heraldist, historian, poet and member of the royal court. His name is sometimes spelled as Wulson or Volson.

He published several highly successful books on symbols, prophecies, heraldry, dreams etc. He put together all the available knowledge and traditions associated with chivalry. In the 17th century chivalry was practically rediscovered by two genealogists in the French court: Vulson de la Colombière and Claude-François Ménestrier after its golden age (1100–1400) and the decline of chivalry, developing its idealized image. Some authors named Vulson de la de la Colombière as the inventor of hatching system of tinctures.

== Life ==
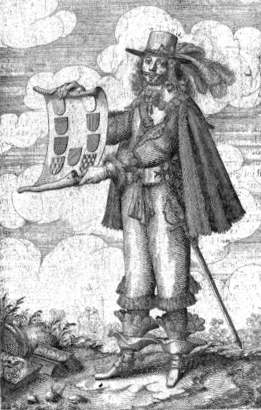
Page 38 of Vulson de la Colombière's 1644 book with his hatching table

We have only some fragmented data about Vulson de la Colombière's life: even major 19th-century biographies deliver only incomplete information. He was born in a Protestant noble family at the end of the 16th century in Dauphiné. He was a son of François, a lawyer, and Michelle Odde de Bonniot. In his youth, he fought for Henry IV. According to one story, in 1618 he went to Paris to request a pardon, after he killed his treacherous wife and her lover.

According to the title pages of his books, (see for example Le Vray Théâtre d´honneur et de Chevalerie, Paris, 1648), he was a member of the parliament in Paris and the member of the Order of Saint Michael (gentilhomme de la Chambre du Roi et Décoré de l’Ordre de Saint-Michel). Until 1635 he was probably living in Grenoble, where he was a royal counsellor in the Dauphiné parliament (conseiller du roi en la cour de parlement de Dauphiné). He also published a book in the spirit of the Gallicanism in Geneva that year. (Several of the Protestant priests and students at the Geneva University were his kinsmen.) Gallicanism served as a means to express his Protestant views in opposition to Catholicism, and he presented them in a way acceptable to the state establishment.

His ideas conformed with those of the king, and so he left Grenoble and settled in Paris, where he devoted himself to the study of heraldry. According to the catalogues of the Bibliothèque Nationale de France, his next book was published in Paris in 1638.

== Hatching and dispute with Silvester Petra Sancta ==
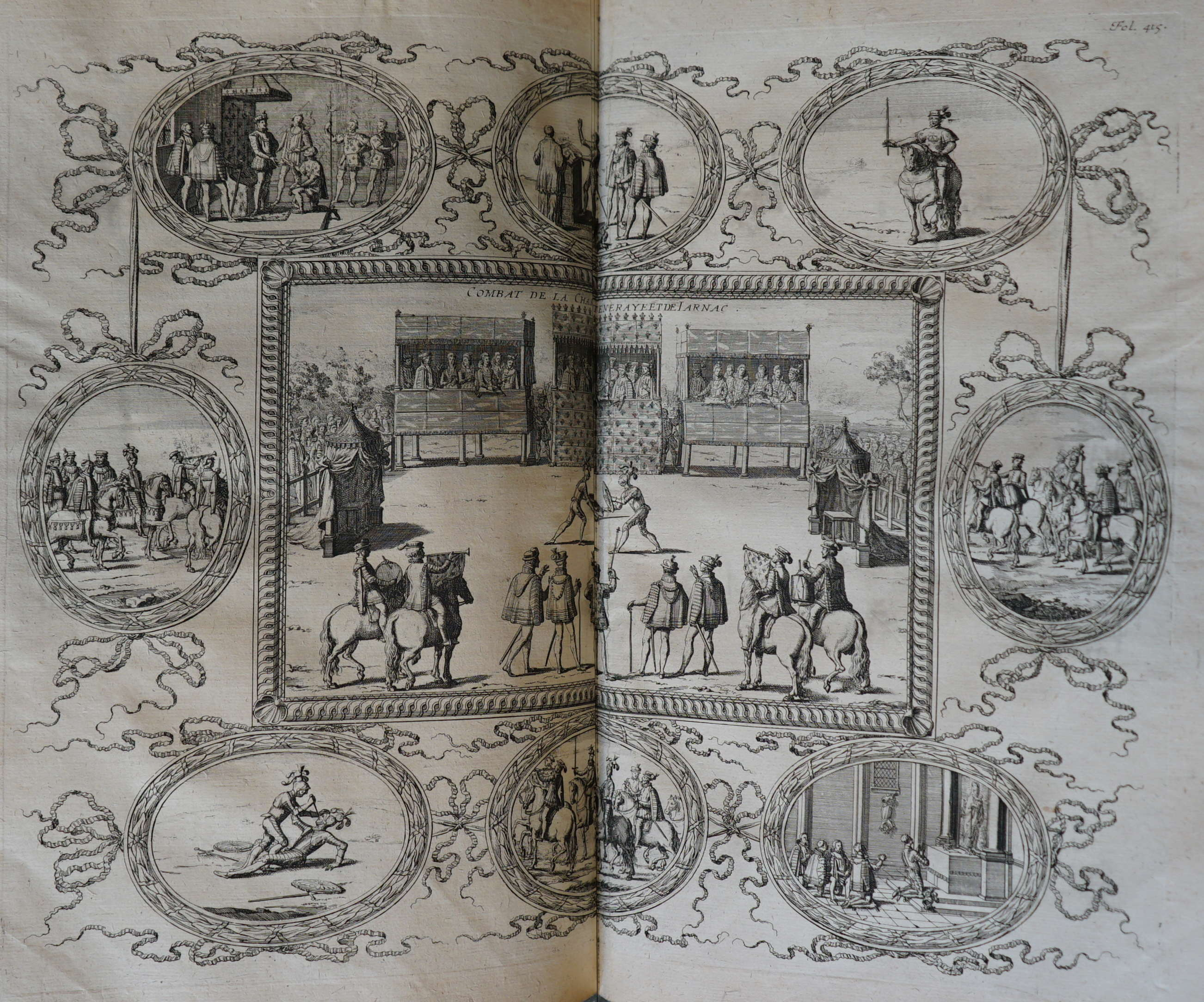
Le vray theatre d'honneur et de chevalerie... (1648)

Frontispiece of Vulson de la Colombière's 1639 book

Vulson de la Colombière had wide-ranging correspondence with the most renowned heraldists of his time. For this reason, it could perhaps be concluded that Vulson de la Colombière was right in claiming the title of the inventor of the hatching system, and accusing Silvester Petra Sancta of copying his method and incorrectly publishing it in his 1638 work, one year before the same hatching system was published by Vulson de la Colombière. On page 37 of his title La Science Heroïque (1644), Vulson de la Colombière maintains that Petra Sancta simply copied his system without any changes. Vulson de la Colombière also maintains that he showed to Petra Sancta his hatching system in the past. In his citation, Vulson de la Colombière also mentions the book publishers and copperplate engravers as the users of the hatching system, thus emphasizing that by using this method on the illustrations, engravers can always designate the tinctures of the copperplates in the same coherent manner. In the title of his 1639 book he directly mentions that hatching is a new method used by copperplate engravings ("suivant l'art des anciens roys d'armes... et une nouvelle méthode de cognoistre les métaux et couleurs sur la taille-douce"). The book was published by Melchior Tavernier, and the engraved fontoispiece was made by Abraham Bosse. Maybe he was also the author of the remaining engravings inside the book. However, Vulson de la Colombière contributed to the drawing and engraving of illustrations too, as we can see from his signature under the armorial genealogical table of his supporter, Denys de Salvaing.

In his 1639 work, Vulson de la Colombière published a hatching table, but did not mention Petra Sancta. The reason probably was that in 1638 the publication of his book was already in progress and/or he knew nothing about the same hatching method published by Petra Sancta in that year. He had also described the way of hatchings by words, and published another hatching table in 1644.

Ottfried Neubecker maintains that the hatching system in heraldry was invented by Vulson de la Colombière and not Petra Sancta who only popularized the system through his second treatise titled Tesserae gentilitia, published in 1638.

== Works ==
- De la Puissance du pape et des libertés de l'Église gallicane. Par Marc de Vulson, conseiller du roi en la cour de parlement de Dauphiné. Genève: Iean de Tournes & Iaques de la Pierre, 1635
- Recueil de plusieurs pièces et figures d'armoiries obmises par les autheurs qui ont escrit jusques icy de cette science, blasonnées par le sieur Vulson de La Colombière,... suivant l'art des anciens roys d'armes, avec un discours des principes et fondemens du blason, et une nouvelle méthode de cognoistre les métaux et couleurs sur la taille-douce. – Paris : M. Tavernier, 1639. – In-4°, pièces, limin., 14 p., armoiries, 75 pl. d'armoiries, la plupart coloriées, frontisp. gr. par Abraham Bosse. (New edition Paris, 1689)
- La Science heroique, traitant de la noblesse, de l'origine des armes de leurs blasons, & symboles, des tymbres, bourlets, couronnes, cimiers, lambrequins, supports, & tenans, & autres ornements de l'escu; de la deuise, & du cry de guerre, de l'escu pendant & des pas & emprises des anciens cheualiers, des formes differentes de leurs tombeaux; et des marques exterieures de l'escu de nos roys, des reynes, & enfans de France, & des officiers de la couronne, et de la maison du roy. Paris 1639 and 1644
- Le vrai Théâtre d'honneur et de chevalerie, ou le miroir héroïque de la noblesse... par Marc de Vulson, sieur de La Colombière... Paris : chez A. Courbé, 1648. – 2 vol. in-fol.
- Carte métodique et introduction succinte à la cognoissance des premières regles du blazon et des principales pieces qu'on employe pour la construction des armoiries, avec les termes dont on se sert pour parler pertinemment de ceste heroïque science... Par Marc de Vulson, sieur de La Colombiere. Paris: M. Van Lochom, 1645
- Le palais des curieux, ou l'algebre et le sort donnent la decision des questions les plus douteuses, et ou les songes et les visions nocturnes sont expliquez selon la doctrine des anciens. Donné au public par le Sieur VV. D. L. C. Paris, 1646
- De l'Office des rois d'armes, des hérauts et des poursuivants; de leur antiquité, de leurs priviléges, et des principales cérémonies où ils sont employés par les rois et par les princes. Avec le nom et les armes de tous les rois et princes souverains de la chrétienté et de la plupart des provinces qui relèvent d'eux. Par Marc de Vulson, Sr de La Colombiere. Paris: P. Lamy, 1645
- Les Oracles divertissans, où l'on trouve la decision des questions les plus curieuses pour se rejouïr dans les compagnies, avec un Traité tres recreatif des couleurs, aux armoiries, aux livrées et aux faveurs, et la signification des plantes, fleurs et fruits, le tout accommodé à la diction française. Par M. W. D. L. C. Paris: A. Courbé, 1647
- Le Palais des curieux, où l'algebre et le sort donnent la décision des questions les plus douteuses, et ou les songes et les visions nocturnes sont expliquez selon la doctrine des Anciens. Seconde édition. Corrigé & augmenté d’un Traité de la physiognomie. Paris: chez Pierre Lamy, 1660
- The court of curiositie wherein by the algebra and lot, the most intricate questions are resolved, and nocturnal dreams and visions explained according to the doctrine of the antients : to which is also added A treatise of physiognomy published in French by Marck de Vulson; translated into English by J. G., Gent. London : Printed by J.C. for William Crooke, 1669.
- The third edition. London: Printed for William Crook, 1681
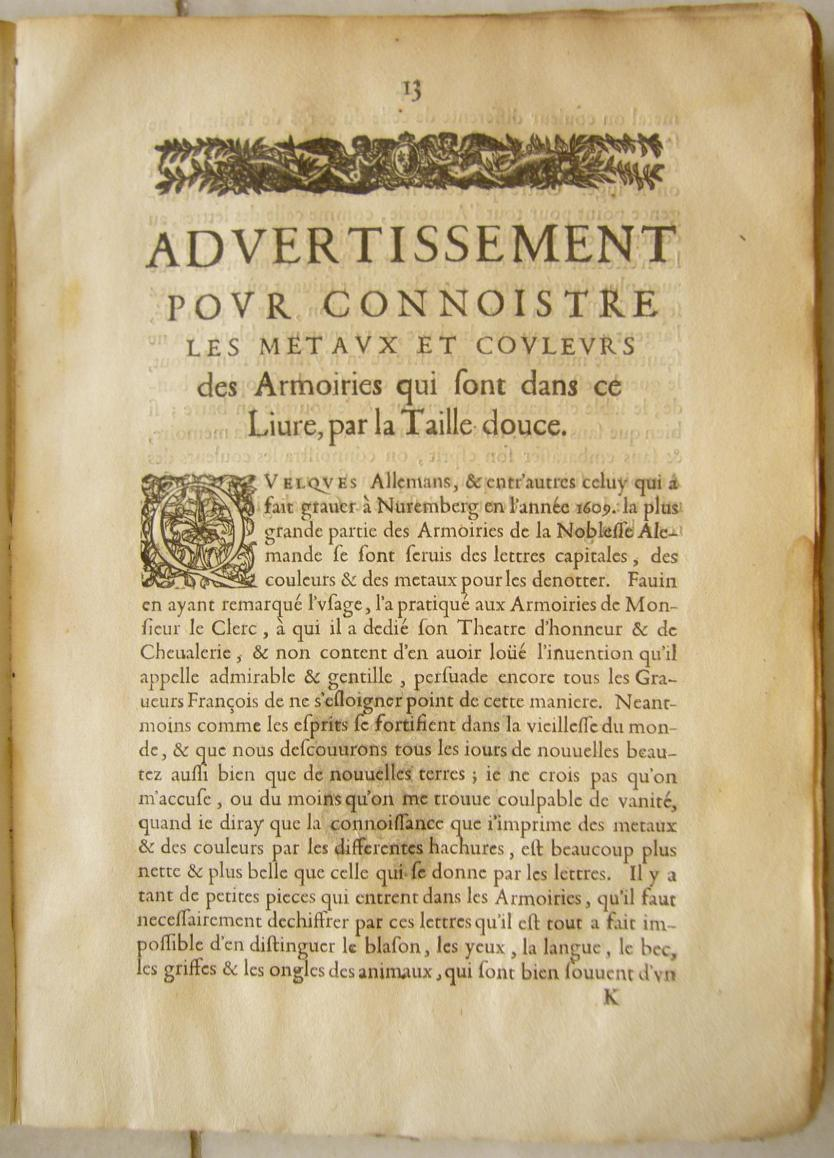
Description of hatching method, Colombière 1639

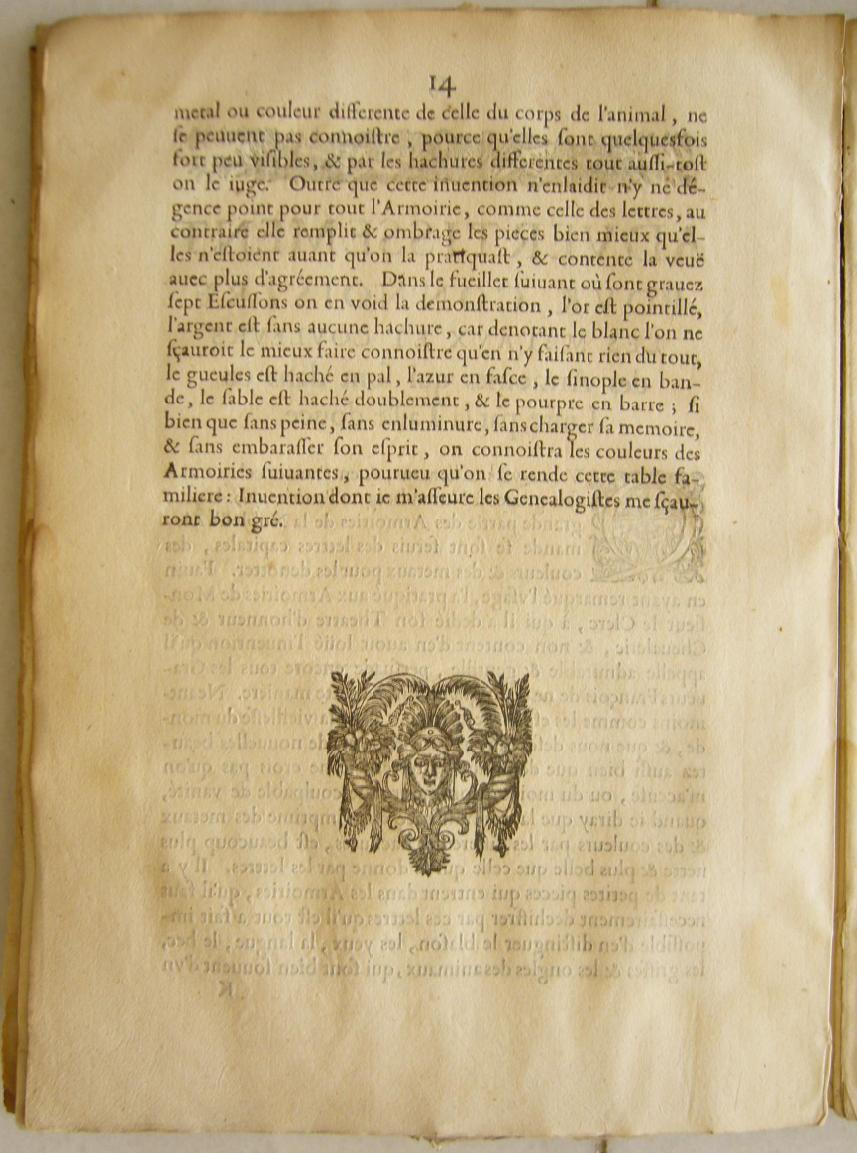
Description of hatching method, Colombière 1639

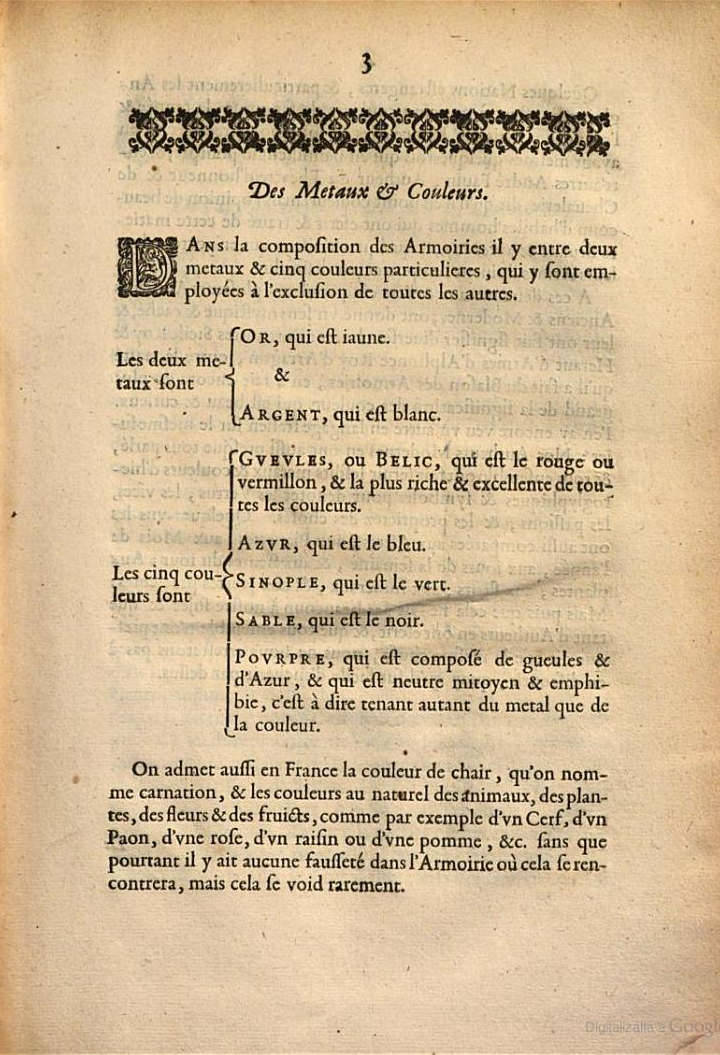
Description of hatching method, Colombière 1639

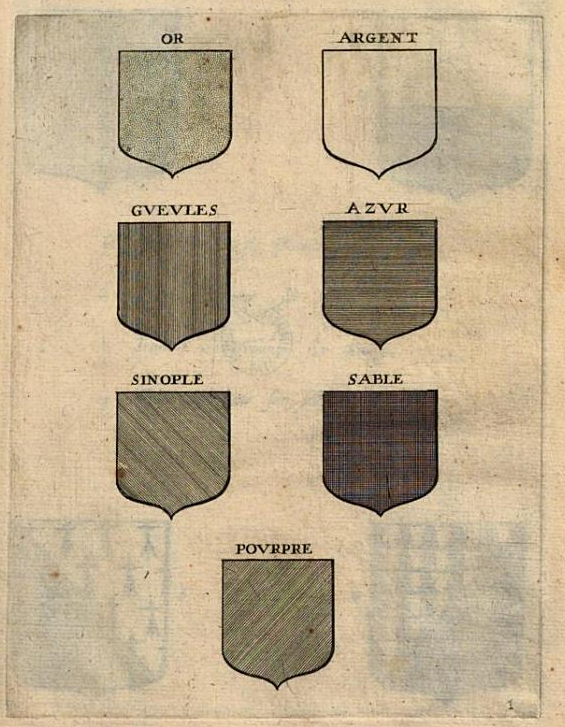
The hatching table, Colombière 1639

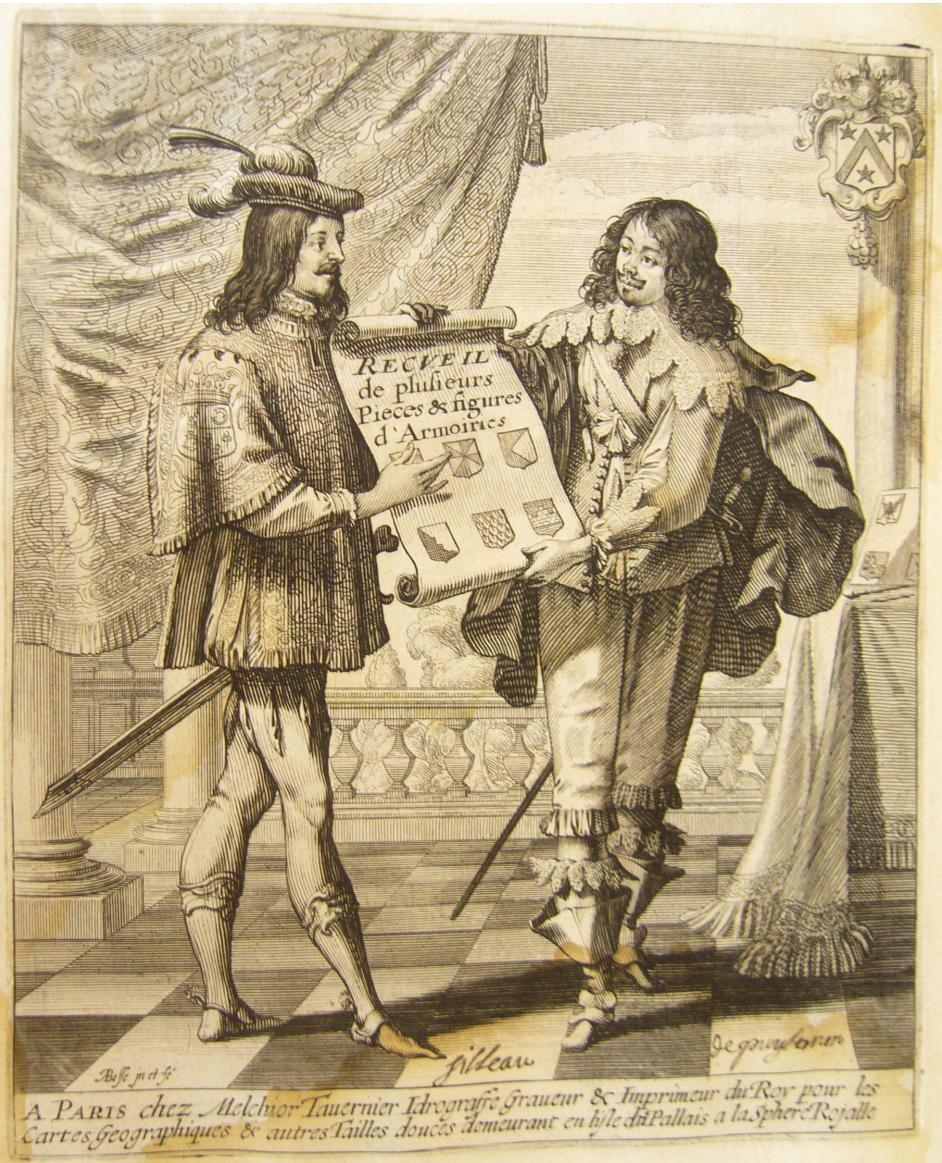
Engraved frontispiece of de la Colombière's 1639 book with all metals, colors and furs, except vert

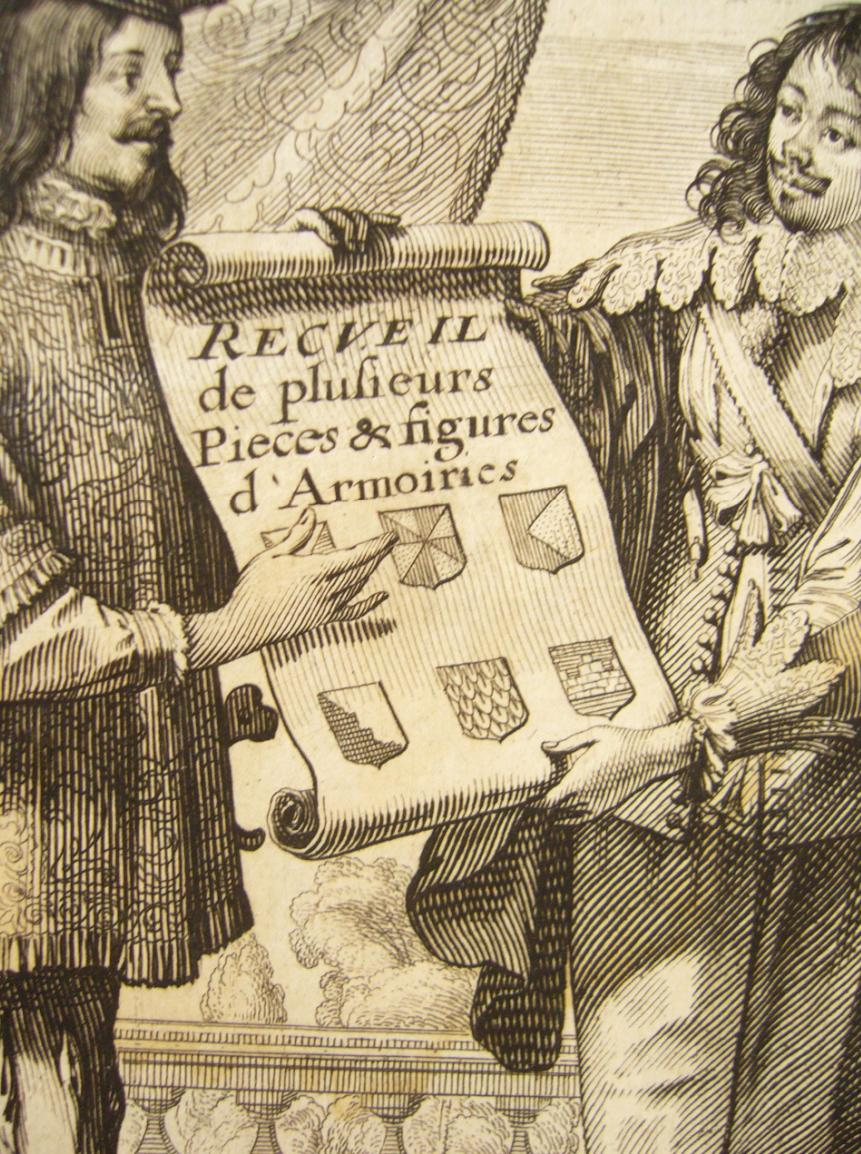
Enlarged fontispiece

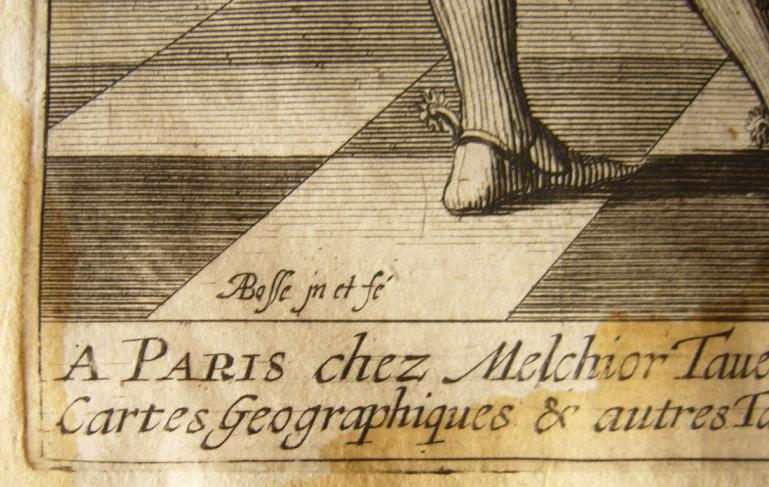
The signature of Abraham Bosse at the fontispiece of de la Colombière's 1639 book

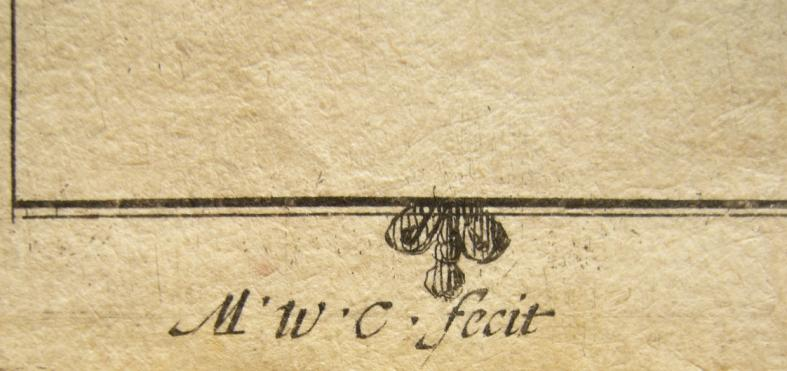
The signature of de la Colombière

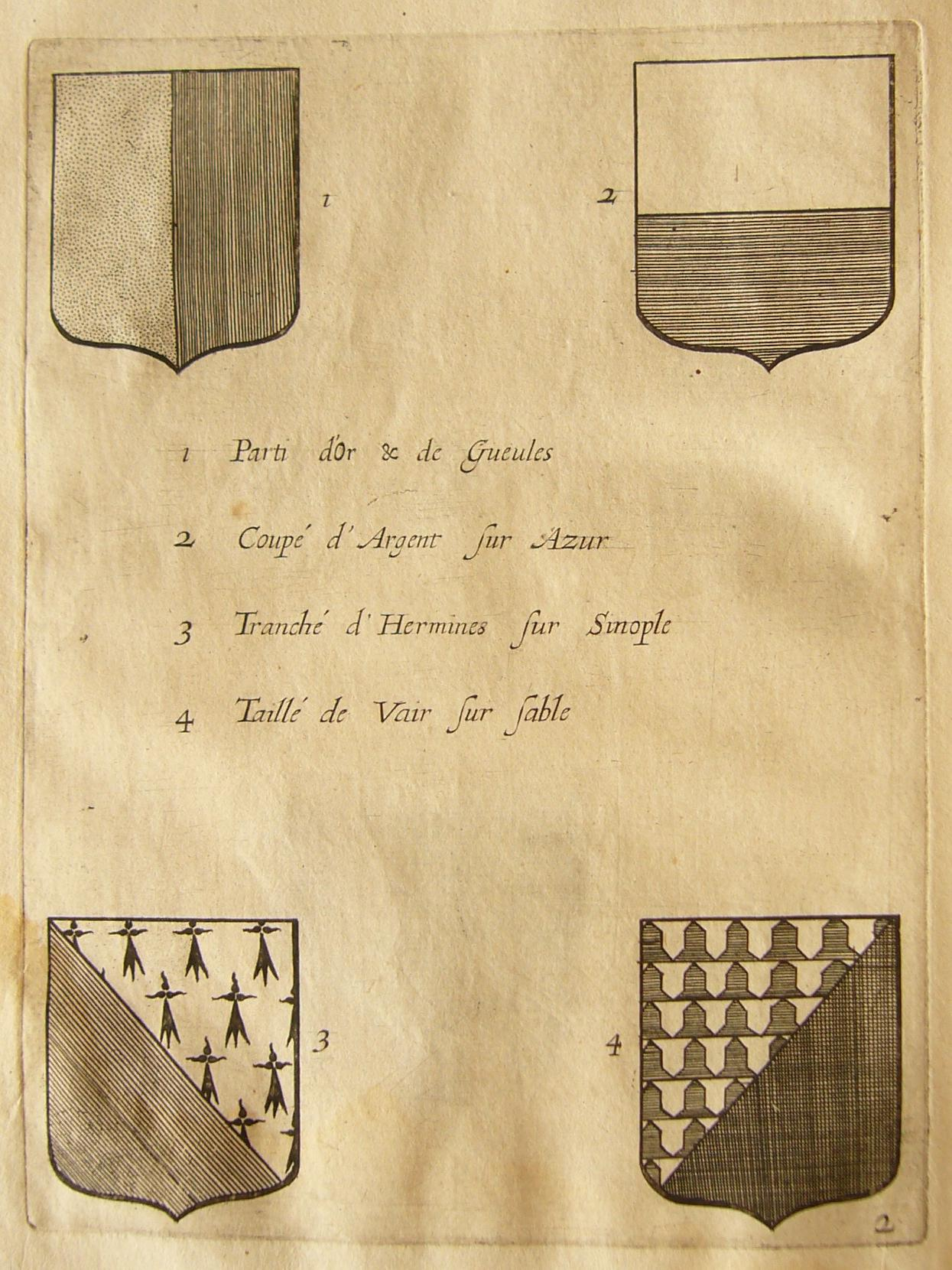
The hatching of all metals, colors and furs at the first and second tables of de la Colombière's 1639 book

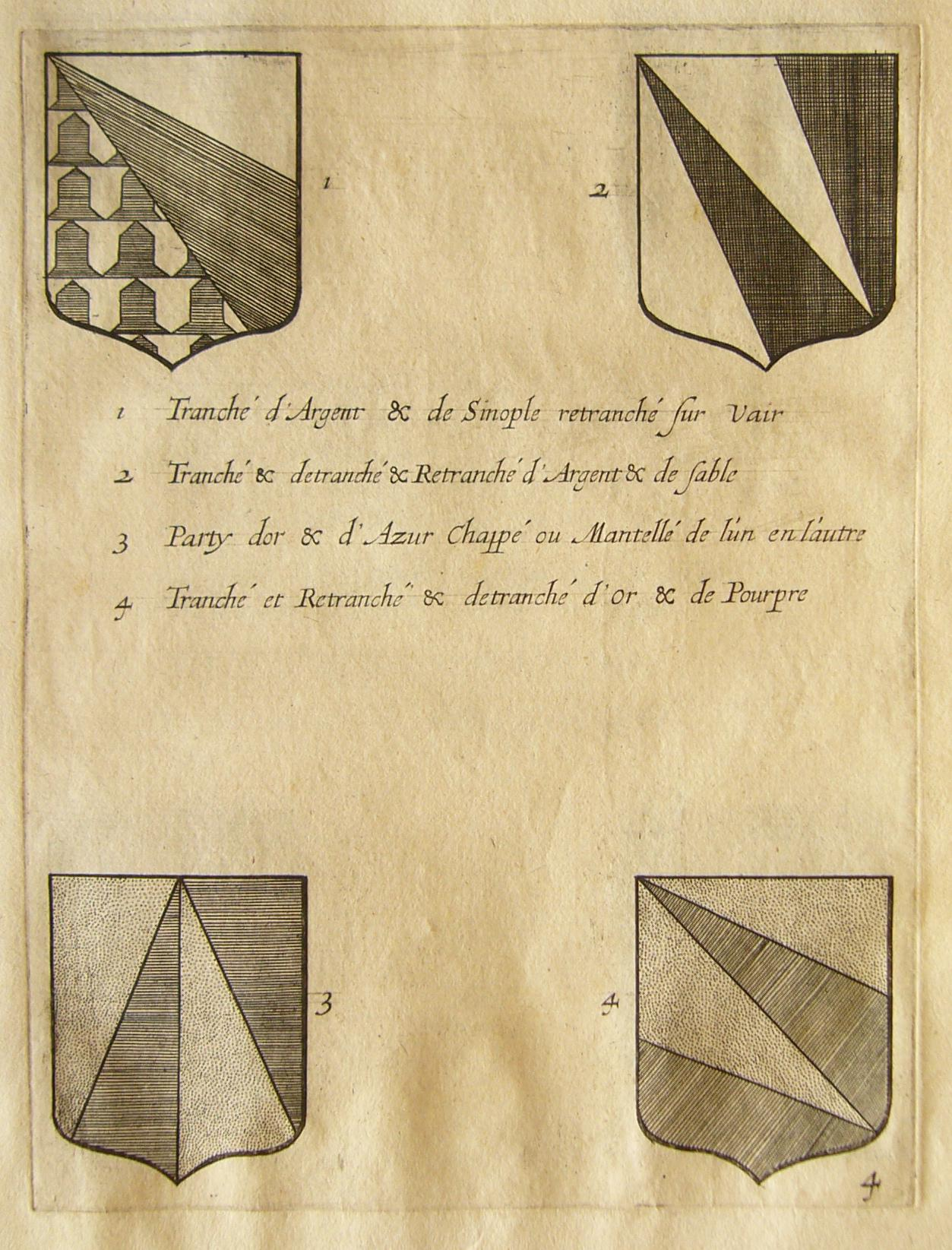
The table no II

== See also ==
- Jan Baptist Zangrius
