= Leuven Gate =

Former city gate in Brussels, Belgium

- Porte de Louvain (French); Leuvensepoort (Dutch)
- Part of the second city walls of Brussels
- Brussels, Belgium
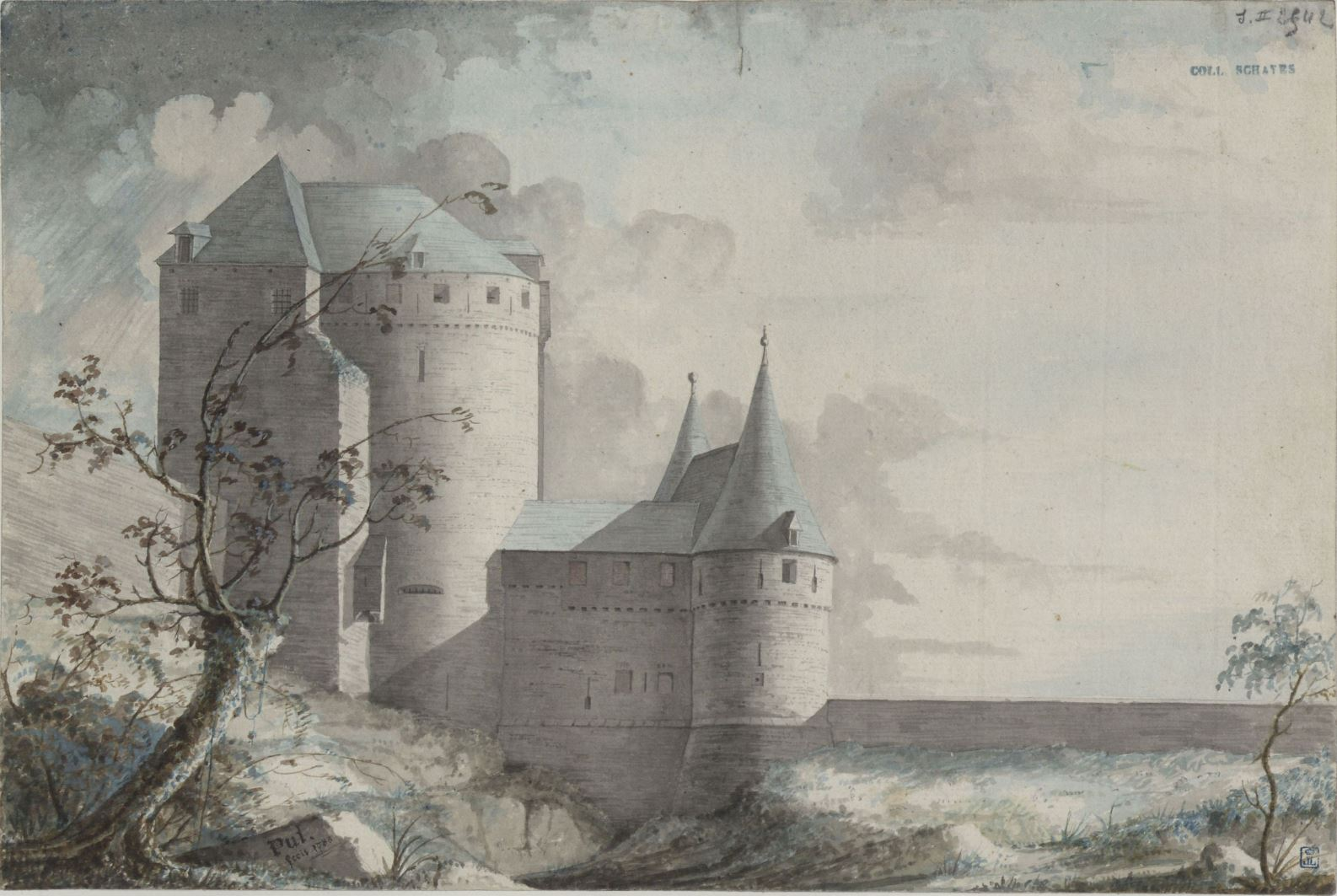
- The Leuven Gate at the end of the 18th century

Site information
- Type: City gate

Location
- Location within Brussels Leuven Gate (Belgium)
- Coordinates: 50°50′53″N 4°22′6″E

Site history
- Materials: Stone

The Leuven Gate (French: Porte de Louvain; Dutch: Leuvensepoort) was one of the medieval city gates of the second walls of Brussels, Belgium.

== See also ==
- Halle Gate, a part of the 14th-century city wall protecting Brussels
- History of Brussels
- Belgium in the long nineteenth century
