= Jan Baptist Zangrius =

Flemish engraver, publisher, typographer and bookseller

Jan Baptist Zangrius (died 1606 in Leuven) was a Flemish engraver, publisher, typographer and bookseller.

His name is mostly spelled as Johannes Baptista Zangrius, but is also known as de Sanger, de Zangre, Zangre, and Zangré.

== Biographical data ==
He was active in Leuven between 1595 and 1606, and it is highly likely that he was a relative of the publishers and typographers Petrus (1559–1623) and Philippus Zangrius (1585–1610).

In 1601, Zangrius engraved portraits of Infante Isabella, her husband Archduke Albrecht Habsburg, the governor of the Low Countries, and Justus Lipsius. These engravings were also included in his 1602 (or 1605) work titled Album Amicorum, which contained a total of 67 engravings. Among these were 46 depictions of womanly costumes and armorial cartouches, as well as 9 smaller and 11 larger armorial engravings.

This work stands as one of the earliest examples of heraldic pavilions likely following the style of Jean-Jacques Boissard. The small armorial shields remain unadorned. The depictions of womanly costumes were engraved based on the tables created by Julius Goltzius, which can be found in the following publication: Jean Jacques Boissard, Habitvs Variarvm Orbis gentium. Habitz de Nations estra:[n]ges. Trachten mancherley Voelcker des Erdskreysz, Cum Priuilegio Caesaro, Cum Priuilegio Regio, 1581 [Mechelen, Caspar Rutz].

== Zangrius in heraldry ==
According to some authors, Zangrius developed the earliest hatching system in heraldry, identical with the present day hatching method, seen on his armorial chart of Brabant. (Jean Baptiste Zangre, Representation de l'Ancienne et Souveraine Duche de Brabant, ses Villes, Dignitez et Dependences, Comme Lothier, Limborghe et Pays de Outre Meuse, Louvain, 1600. Measures: 49 x 56.3 cm). Though manufactured by Arnold van Rincvelt, it is better known as the armorial chart of Zangrius. The original chart is held by the Helmond Castle-Townhall.

The armorial chart of Zangrius was first published in the 81st volume (1964) of the De Nederlandsche Leeuw by F. J. van Ettro. He maintains that the present-day hatching system was invented by Zangrius. The historical background for the coming into existence of the armorial chart was the 6 March 1598 edict of the Spanish king Philip II who detached the Low Countries in his testament from Spain and gave independence to the Netherlands on the occasion of the marriage of his daughter Infante Isabella to archduke Albrecht Habsburg who served as the governor of the province since 1596. The princely consorts marched across Brussels ceremoniously on 5 September 1599. As Albrecht Habsburg died in 1621 without heirs, the country returned to the Spanish crown, as was stated in the treaty. (For another engraving from 1623, portraying Albrecht's funeral procession, see the picture taken from Jacob Franquart.) Albrecht's proclamation of the sovereignty was illustrated by numerous armorial charts published by several cities and noblemen of the Low Countries, and the armorial chart of Zangrius held in the Helmond Castle-Townhall is one of them.

F. J. van Ettro maintained: "Particularly noteworthy about this chart is, that the metals gold and silver, and the colours red, blue, green and black, are rendered according to the same system of hatching by means of dots and stripes, as is being used to this day in modern heraldry" (op. cit. p.211).

However, the hatching systems of Silvester Petra Sancta (1638) and Marcus Vulson de la Colombière (1639), respectively differ from the method developed by Zangrius in the way of hatching of the colour Sable. Thus, it almost seems evident that Petra Sancta or de la Colombière modeled their systems after Zangrius' hatching table.

Zangrius inscribed into the oval escutcheon of his hatching table both the heraldic and standard French language appellations of the given tinctures as follows – Or, Argent, Geulle [gueules] and Rouge (gules), Azur and Bleu (azure), Sinople and Verd [Vert] (vert). The hatching used by him for these tinctures is identical with contemporary hatching methods. The only difference in Zangrius' system was the hatching of the colour sable (Sable and Noir by Zangrius), i.e. crossing of vertical and diagonal lines from the heraldic left to right instead of the present day's crossing of vertical and horizontal lines.

== Works ==
Albvm Amicorvm Habitibvs Mvliervm Omniv[m] Natoinv[m] Evropae, tvm Tabvlis as Scvtis Vacvis in aes Incisis Adonatvm, Vt quisque et sÿmbola et insignia sua gentilitia in ÿs depingi commode curare possit; Lovanii Apud Ioannem Baptistam Zangrium. Anno 1599

== Published engravings ==
Hollstein‘s Dutch & Flemish Etchings, Engravings and Woodcuts 1450-1700. Volume LVIII, I. Wyngaerden to Anthony van Zylvelt. Compided by Jeroen de Scheemaker, Edited by D. De Hoop Scheffer. Sound & Vision Publishers Rotterdam 2001, in co-operation with the Rijksprentenkabinet, Rijksmuseum Amsterdam. pp. 40–64.

== Gallery ==
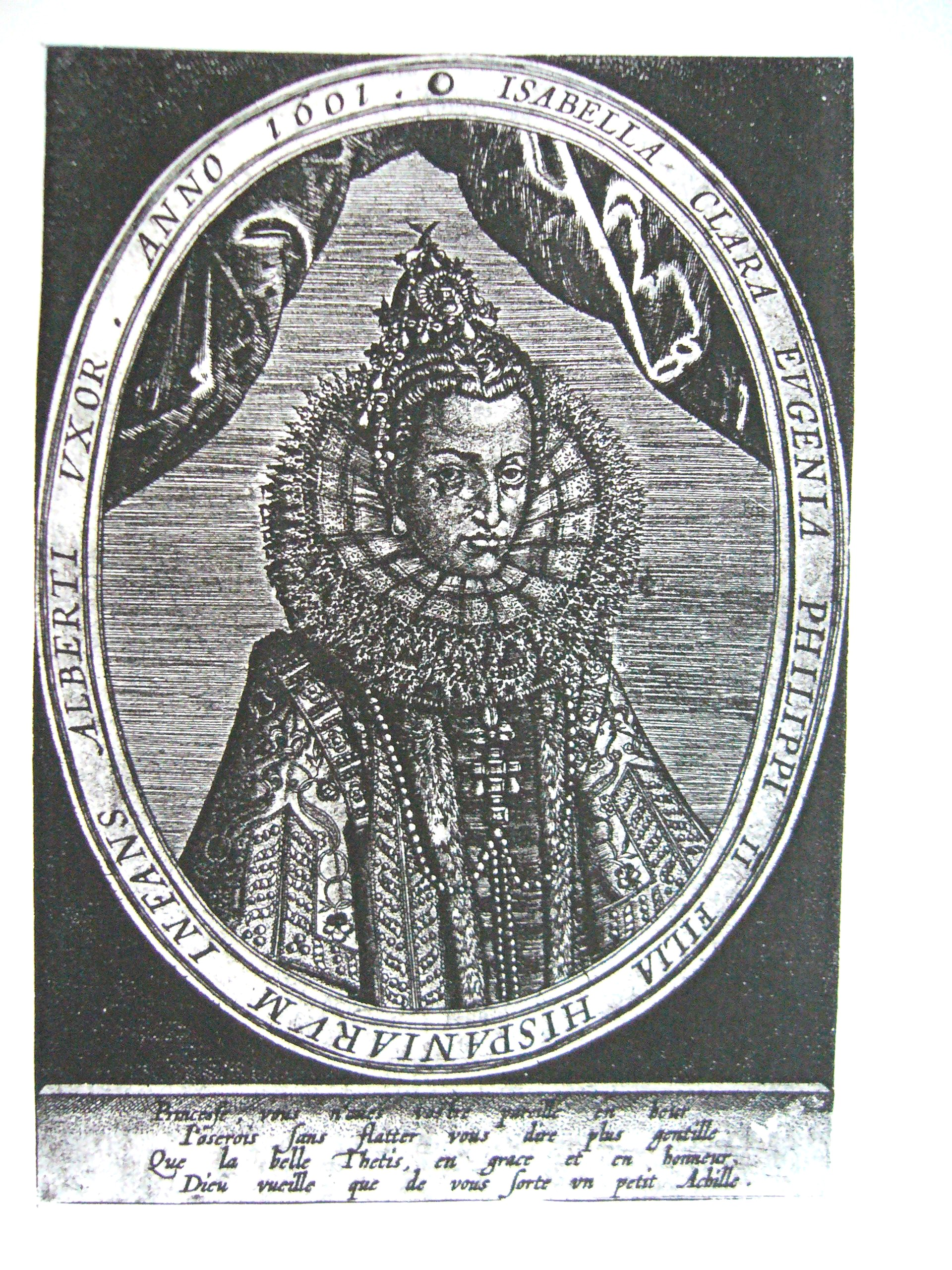
Engraved portrait of Infante Isabella

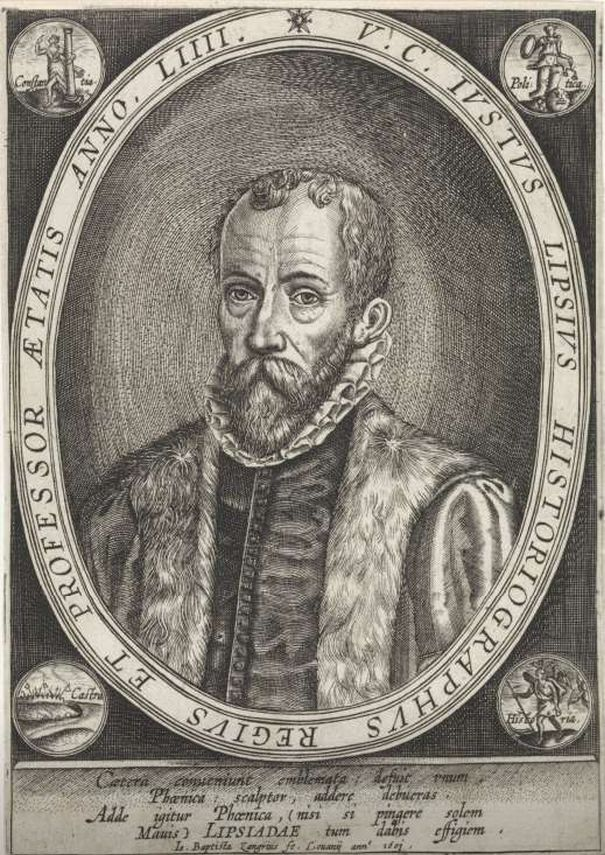
Engraved portrait of Justus Lipsius

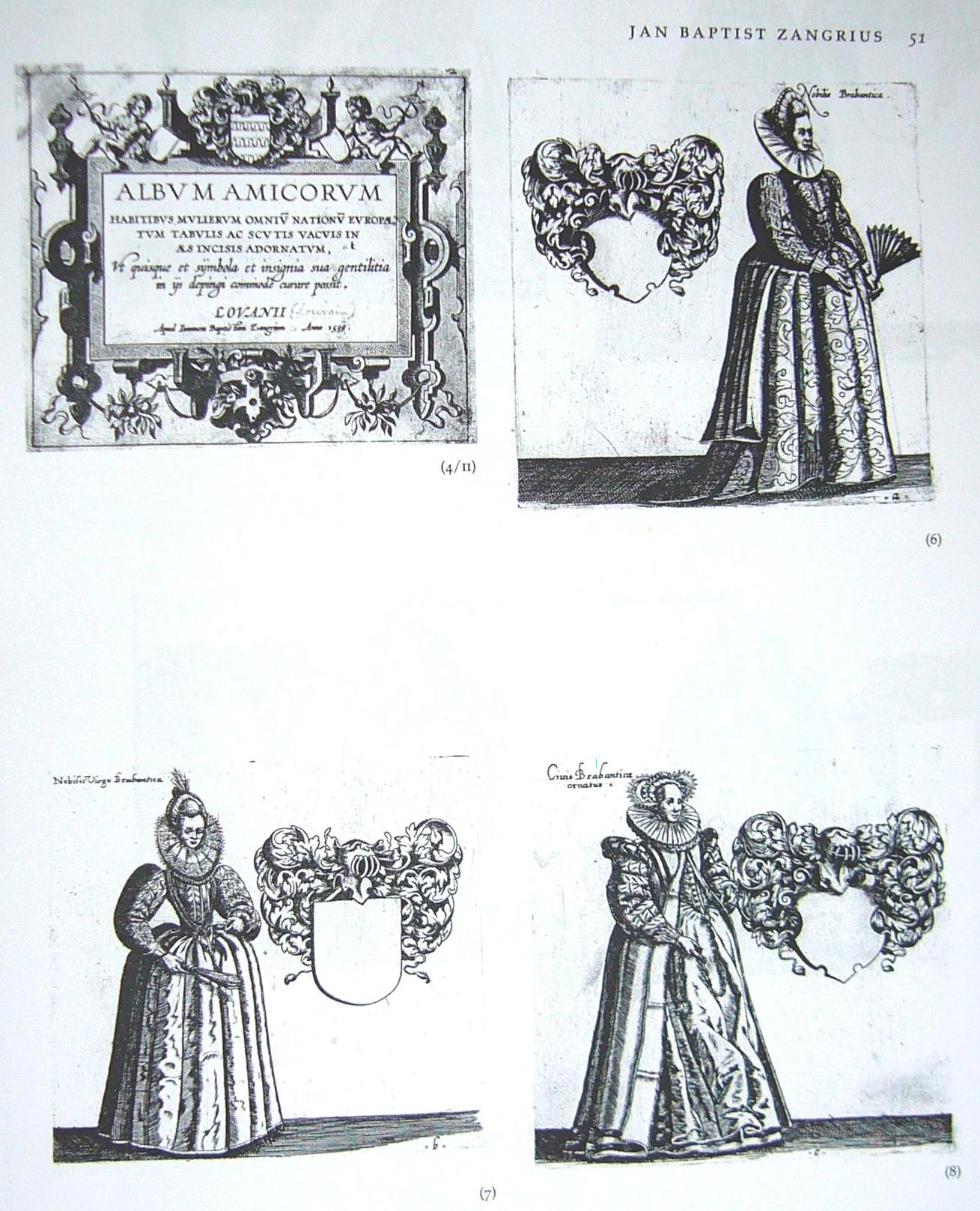
Title page and engravings from the Album Amicorum

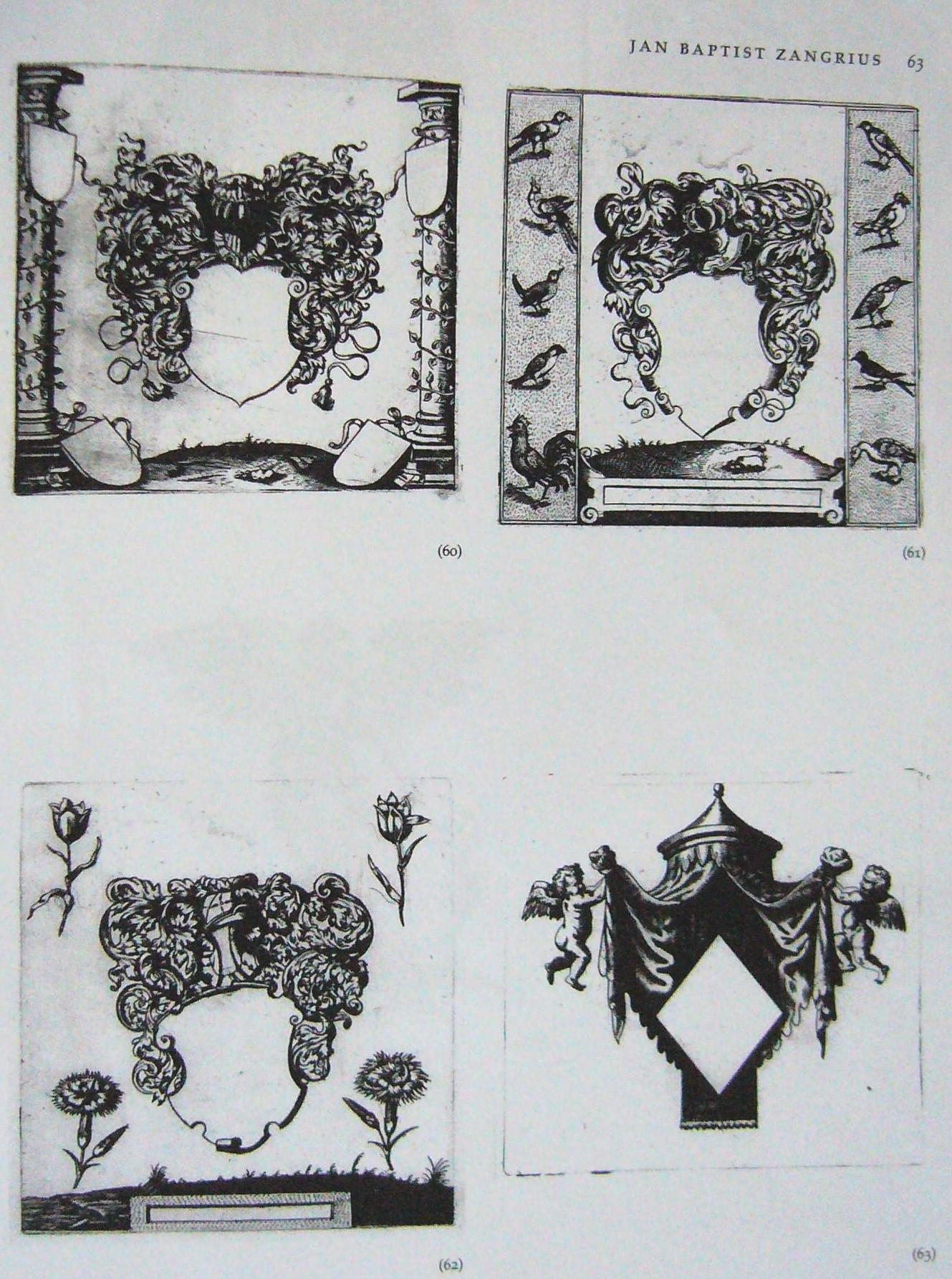
Engravings from Album Amicorum with an early example of heraldic pavilions

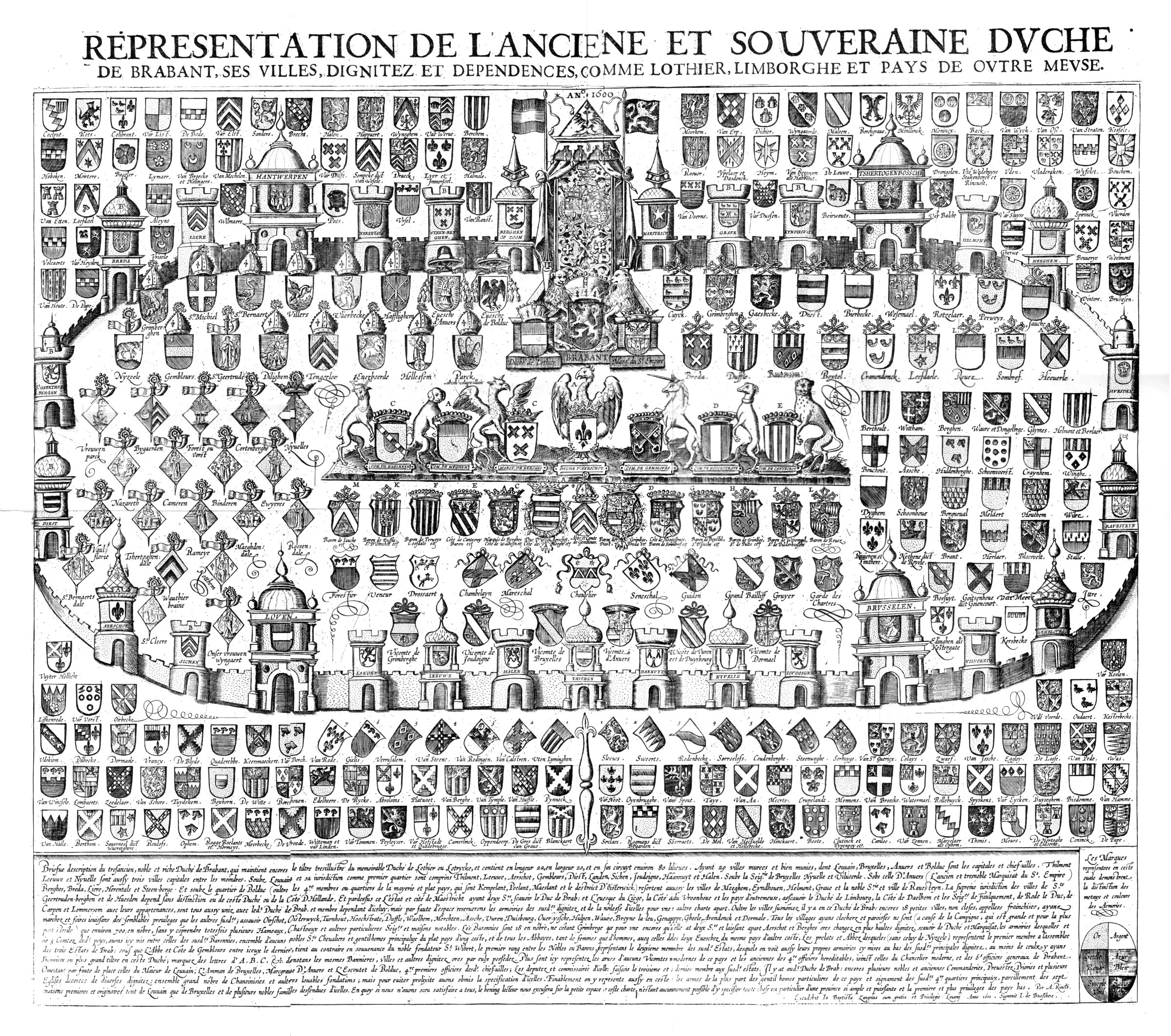
Reproduction of the armorial chart

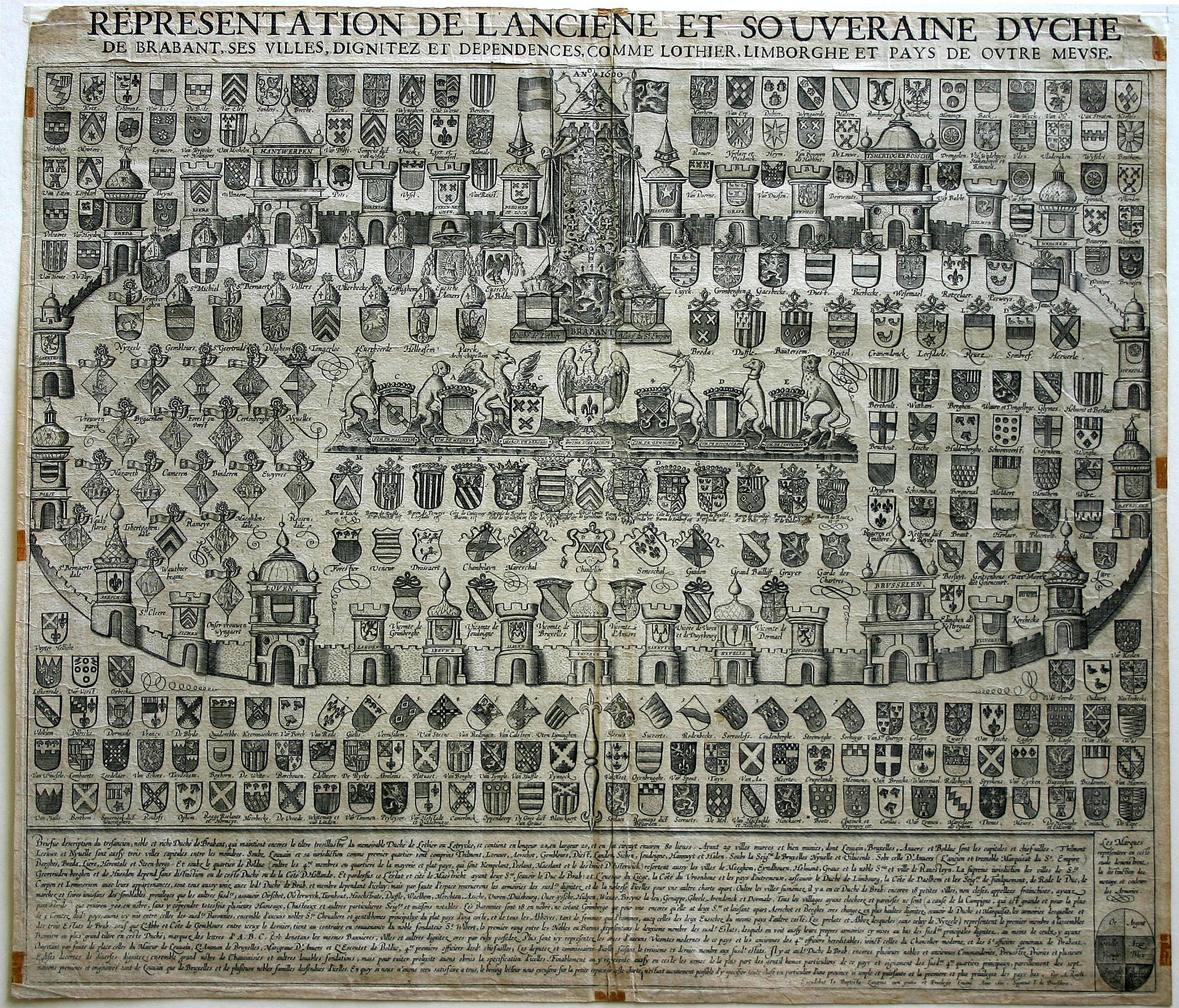
The original of the armorial chart from the Helmond archive

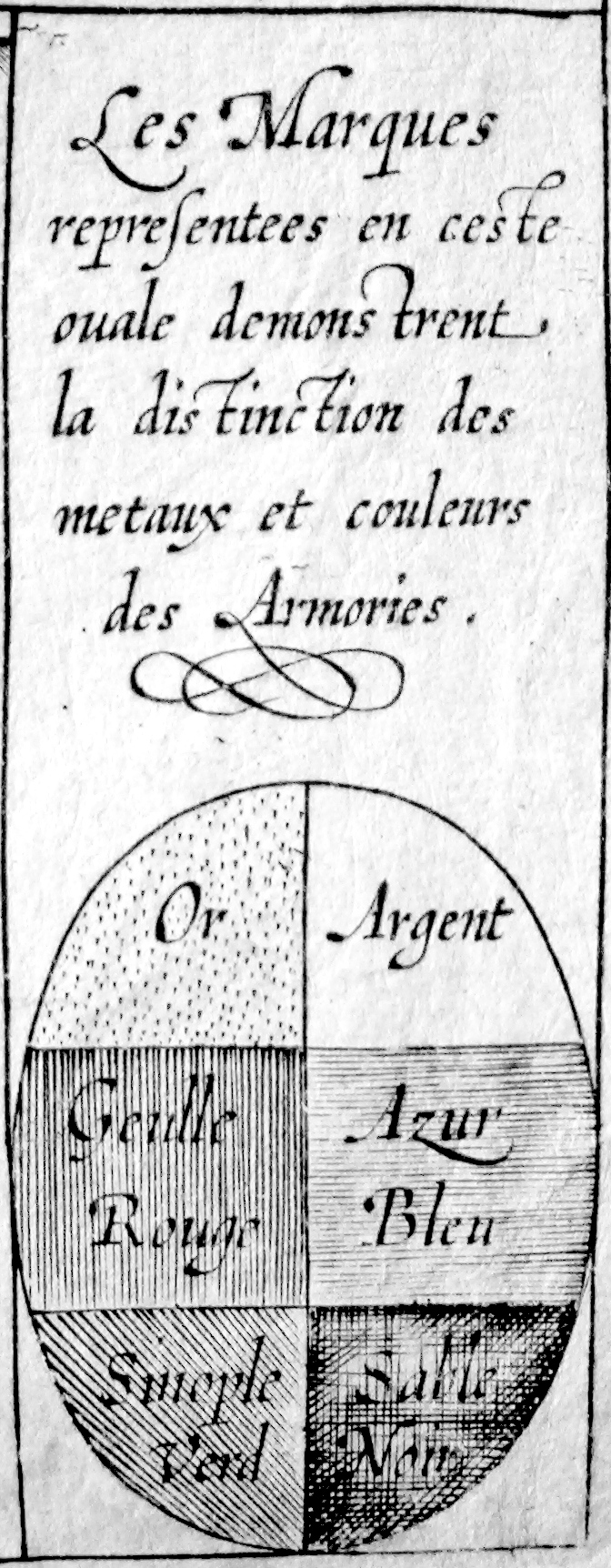
The hatching table of Zangrius from his armorial chart

== Literature ==
- Füßli, H. H. : Allgemeiner Künstlerlexikon, Zweiter Theil, Elfter Abschnitt, Zürich 1820
- Hollstein, F. W. H.: Dutch & Flemish etchings, engravings and woodcuts 1450-1700, vol. 1-, Amsterdam 1949–87; Roosendaal 1988–93; Rotterdam 1995-
- Icones Leidenses. De Portretverzameling van de Rijksuniversiteit te Leiden, Leiden 1973
- Immerzeel Jr., J.: De levens en werken der Hollandsche en Vlaamsche kunstschilders, beeldhouwers, graveurs en bouwmeesters van het begin der vijftiende eeuw tot heden, 3 vols., Amsterdam 1842–43
- Kamm, C.: De levens en werken der Hollandsche en Vlaamsche kunstschilders, beeldhouwers, graveurs en bouwmeesters, 6 vols. and suppl., Amsterdam 1857–64
- Linnig, B.: La gravure en Belgique, Anvers 1911
- Nagler, G. K.: Neues Allgemeines Künstler-Lexikon, 22 vols. München 1835–22
- Rouzet, A.: Dictionnaire des imprimeurs, Libraires et éditeurs des XVe et XVIe siècles dans les limites geographiques de la Belgique actuelle, Nieuwkoop 1975
- Simoni, A. E. C.: Catalogue of Books from the Low Countries 1601–1621 in the British Library, London 1990
- Someren, J. F. van: Beschrijvende catalogus van gegraveerde portretten van Nederlanders, 3 vols., Amsterdam 1888–91
- Singer, H. W.: Allgemeiner Bildniskatalog, 14 vols., Leipzig 1930–36
- Thieme, U. and Becker, F.: Allgemeines Lexikon der bildenen Künstler, 37 vols., Leipzig 1907–50
- Wurzbach, A. von: Niederländsisches Künstler-Lexikon, 3 vols., Wien and Leipzig 1906–11
- F.J. van Ettro, The Heraldic Chart of Brabant by Zangrius for the year 1600. De Nederlandsche Leeuw, 1964, pp. 211–217
