= Gusset (heraldry) =

Heraldic charge shaped like a "Y"

Gusset as charge (Fr. Gousset)

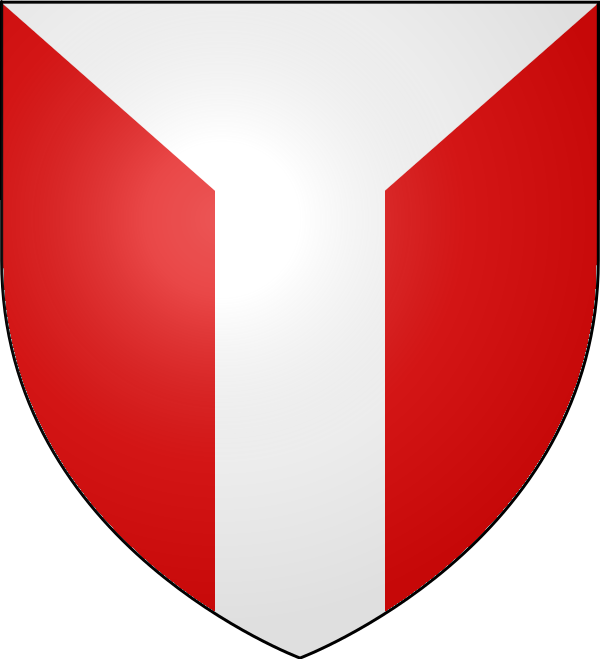
Gussets (pair) as 'truncation of the field'

In heraldry, a gusset is a charge resembling the union of a pile with a pale extending from chief to base (or in the case of a flag typically resembling the union of a pile and a fess extending from hoist to fly). In French heraldry, it has been classed as one of the thirty honorable ordinaries. For an 'inverted' gusset, one issuing from base and extending to the chief, some authors prefer the term graft.

Other heraldic traditions conceive of the gusset not as this central charge but as a "line of truncation of the field", a flank-like charge similar to the gore or flaunch. A pair of gussets defined this way produce said central form as negative space between them upon the field. Heraldic writers in these traditions describe the gusset as 'line of truncation of the field' as "a traverse line" extending diagonally from the dexter or sinister point of the chief across one-third of the field, then descending in a straight line orthogonal to the base.

== Gusset as abatement ==
In English heraldry, the gusset, in the conception of it as a charge resembling a gore or flaunch, was at one time regarded as an abatement of the field—a mark of dishonor or disgrace. A "sanguine" (blood-red) gusset dexter was said to signify adultery and a gusset sinister of the same tincture, drunkenness. A noble so disgraced could also be compelled to bear both dexter and sinister on their escutcheon. However, heraldic writers emphasized that a pair of gussets in other tinctures, such as metals or furs, was not an abatement at all but a charge "of perfect bearing". But heraldic writers have also dismissed the purported use of the gusset as an abatement as "whimsical" and "probably fanciful", noting that no actual examples of its use were known.

== Origin of term ==
The English word gusset derives from the Norman French 'gousset' meaning literally 'hollow of the armpit'. But in use the word referred not to the body but to a piece of armor. A gousset was small piece of chainmail used in the early 15th century, during the transition from chainmail to plate armor. It covered vulnerable areas not protected by the plate armor of the time—the joints, the hollow of the armpit, elbow, or knee.

== Other contemporary uses of the term gusset ==
In contemporary English, the term gusset refers to a small pieces of fabric used in sewing both to reinforce garments at key points—such as the armpit or crotch—and to help clothing conform to the body. The term is also used in metal work and construction, as 'gusset plate', to denote a piece of metal used to brace the joining of structural elements—such as beams or girders to columns. The term gyron for that (triangular) heraldic charge is said to be derived an Old French word for gusset.

== Gallery ==
Coat of arms of Landévennec

Coat of arms of Paluel, Seine-Maritime

Coat of arms of Saint-Pabu

Coat of arms of Saint-Raymond, Quebec

Coat of arms of Sainte-Marie-du-Mont, Manche

Coat of arms of the former Cabano, Quebec

Coat of arms of Bouches-du-Rhône

=== On flags ===
Flag of Vanuatu

Flag of Cotorra, Córdoba, Colombia

Flag of Odolena Voda, Czech Republic

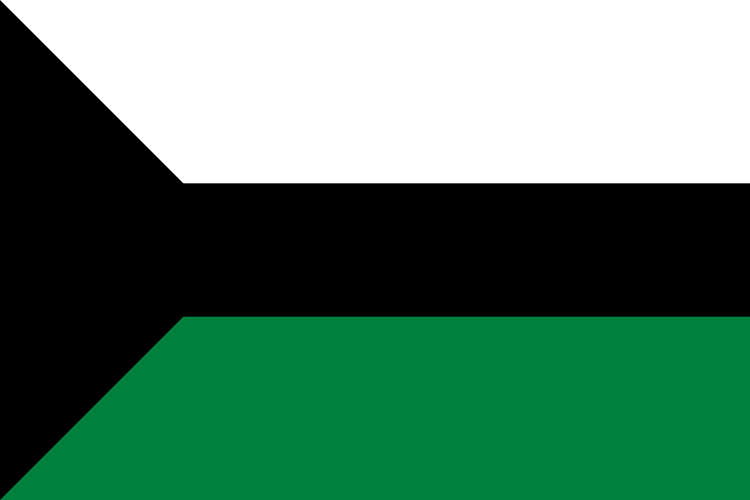
Flag of La Joya de los Sachas, Ecuador

Flag of Kisszállás, Bács-Kiskun County, Hungary

Flag of Nizhnevartovsk, Russia

Flag of Jubaland, Somalia

Flag of Amapá, Brazil

Former flag of Spokane, Washington, USA (1912–1958)

Flag of Bouches-du-Rhône

Flag of the Black Country

== See also ==
Gyron
Esquarre (heraldry)
Esquire (heraldry)
Ordinary (heraldry)
Charge (heraldry)
Liste de pièces héraldiques
