= Tenné =

Orange-brown non-standard tincture

- Class: Stain
- Non-heraldic equivalent: Orange, brown, orange-tawny colour

Monochromatic designations
- Hatching pattern
- Tricking abbr.: ♌︎

Poetic designations
- Heavenly body: Dragon's tail
- Jewel: Sardonyx

Brunâtre
- Class: Non-standard colour
- Non-heraldic equivalent: Brown

Monochromatic designations
- Hatching pattern

Poetic designations

In heraldry, tenné (/ˈtɛni/; sometimes termed tenny or tawny) is a "stain", or non-standard tincture, of orange (in English blazonry), light brown (in French heraldry) or orange-tawny (in continental heraldry) colour.

Tenné, however, is not to be confused with brunâtre ("brownish") of French and German blazons.

Difference between tenné & brunâtre

Tenné is used for the depiction of leather colour, while the much darker brunâtre is used for the depiction of bear hide colour.

== Etymology ==
In the Oxford English Dictionary, tenné is described as "orange-brown, as a stain used in blazoning", and as a mid-16th-century variant of Old French tané. The origin of both tenné and tawny is the Medieval Latin word tannare, meaning "to tan leather". As such, in French (and most of continental) heraldry, tenné is the light-brownish colour that leather is supposed to have once tanned. Used primarily for depicting wood and skin in proper charges, it then slowly became its own tincture.

According to the Oxford English Dictionary, the first known use of term tenné in English (as 'tenne') was by Gerard Leigh in his 1562 Accedens of Armory. Leigh (1597) says of the tincture so named: "It is the surest colour that is, of so bright a hewe, being componed: for it is made of two bright colours, which is Redde and Yellowe". Elsewhere, Leigh observes that roundels colored tenné are termed 'oranges' "because the Orenge is of the same colour, and is also round". A glossary appended to a later edition of the same work defines tenné as "Orenge colour".

== Hatchings ==
Perhaps as a symptom of the theoretical nature of heraldic stains, the hatchings assigned to these have been inconsistent among sources. The hatching for tenné has been given variously as a combination of vertical lines (as gules) and dexter to sinister lines (as vert), or as a combination of horizontal lines (as azure) and sinister to dexter lines (as purpure), (and other combinations may be found in other sources) though both these sources provide the same hatching of alternating vertical dots and dashes for "orange".

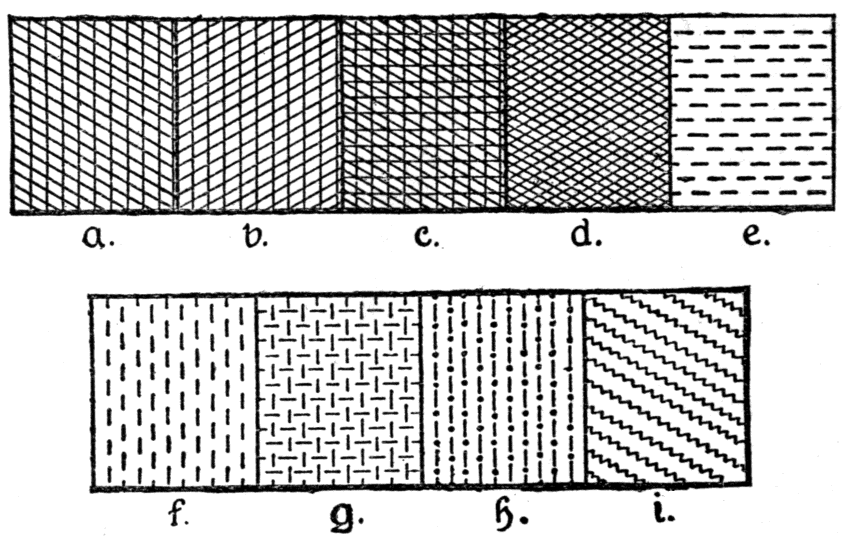
Fig. 36 from Fox-Davies, Complete Guide to Heraldry (1909): Extended hatching scheme used in continental heraldry. a, Tenné; b, blood-red (Sanguine); c, earth-brown (Brunâtre); d, Iron; e, water-colour or Bleu céleste; f, flesh-colour or Carnation; g, ashen-grey or Cendrée; h, orange; and i, colour of nature (proper).

== Poetic meanings ==
In the system of poetic meanings, tenné is associated with the Dragon's tail and with the gemstone sardonyx.

== In theory and in practice ==
While tenné is frequently mentioned in books about heraldry, it is not among the basic heraldic colours and its appearance in practice is quite rare. Arthur Charles Fox-Davies, in his Complete Guide to Heraldry, asserted that both tenné and murrey were probably inventions of the theoretical (though never shown in actual practice) system of abatements, further commenting that he knew of only one instance of tenné to date (as of 1909), and that was in an estate livery rather than coat armory. The Oxford Guide to Heraldry cites a late-14th century English treatise as stating that in addition to the two metals and five colours, a colour called tawny was "borne only in the Empire and France," the Oxford Guide also citing Gerard Leigh's The Accendance of Armory (1562) as rejecting tenné or tawny as non-existent and sanguine or murrey as mistaken purpure.

== In Britain ==
Coat of arms of West Yorkshire, supported by a lion per fess gules and sable (dexter) and a lion per fess tenne and vert (sinister), with a lion per fess gules and tenne in crest

Despite its role in the system of theoretical abatements of honour introduced in the 16th century, tenné is quite rare in British armory, appearing only occasionally in liveries and never as a colour upon the escutcheon. The Oxford Guide to Heraldry notes that the "stains" (tenné, murrey and sanguine) "occur occasionally in the twentieth century but have never been spotted in a Visitation record." Fox-Davies named the estate livery of Lord Fitzhardinge, worn by the lord's hunt servants, as the only known occurrence of "orange-tawny" in British armory. To this, Woodward was able to add the standards of both the Earl of Derby, bearing the Stanley crest upon a field of tawny and vert, and the Earl of Northumberland, bearing "four horizontal bands, the upper being russet, the two central ones yellow, and the lowest tawny". The Coat of arms of West Yorkshire (1975–1986) was supported on the sinister side by a lion per fess tenne and vert, with a lion per fess gules and tenne in crest.

According to the Heraldry Society of Scotland, the team colours of the Dundee United Football Club should be called "tenny and argent". Dundee United calls the colours tangerine and white, and the team is referred to as "the tangerines".

== In continental Europe ==
According to the Oxford Guide to Heraldry, a late-14th century English treatise on heraldry stated that a colour called tawny was "borne only in the Empire and France." Fox-Davies suggested that orange, as it appears in German heraldry, may be a different colour than tenné, noting that a different hatching is associated with German orange than that of British tenné. German heraldic author Ottfried Neubecker also noted a distinction between orange and brown or tenné, showing the usual hatching for tenné but a distinctive hatching of alternating vertical dots and dashes for orange. Orangé, tanné and tenné appear in the civic arms of several communes in the Department of Oise in France.

In French heraldry, tanné (same as tenné) is traditionally a light brown. It is to be a light brown colour, bright enough to be distinguished from the darkest heraldic colour, sable (black), as well as the darker brown color brunâtre, used for bear hide fur. It should also be a distinctive brown, and be clearly different than both flesh-color carnation and orangé, used per example as the field color for the arms of the French commune of Lamorlaye. Tenné takes its name from the colour of tanned leather, and occurs in the field of the arms of a few French communes, including Maruéjols-lès-Gardon. Tanné colour also occurs in the dexter chief quarter of the arms of La Neuville-Roy, where it notably replaces azure as the field for a semy of fleurs-de-lys very reminiscent of the ancient arms of France.

In Spanish heraldry, is a very uncommon colour, present as pardo in the flag of the city of Burgos.

In English heraldry, all these colours are sometimes—yet mistakenly—confused as tenné.

Arms of the French city of Maruéjols-lès-Gardon, bearing a field tenné

Arms of the French commune of La Neuville-Roy, bearing a field tanné in the dexter chief quarter.

Arms of Lamorlaye, a city in French Oise, bearing a field orangé

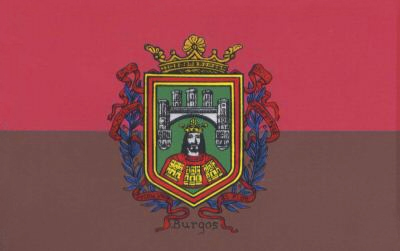
Flag, with COA, of Burgos (Spain)

== In Australia ==
Coat of arms of the Northern Territory

Granted in 1978, the Coat of arms of the Northern Territory has a tenny field, with a design inspired by Aboriginal paintings.

== In South Africa ==
1910 arms of South Africa

Orange is a common colour in South African heraldry, because of the history of South Africa as a Dutch colony, and the fact that royal house of the Netherlands is the House of Orange. The Dutch Prince's Flag was an orange white and blue tricolour, and this was the basis of the flags of the Orange Free State (1857-1902) and the Union of South Africa (1928-1994).

== In the United States ==
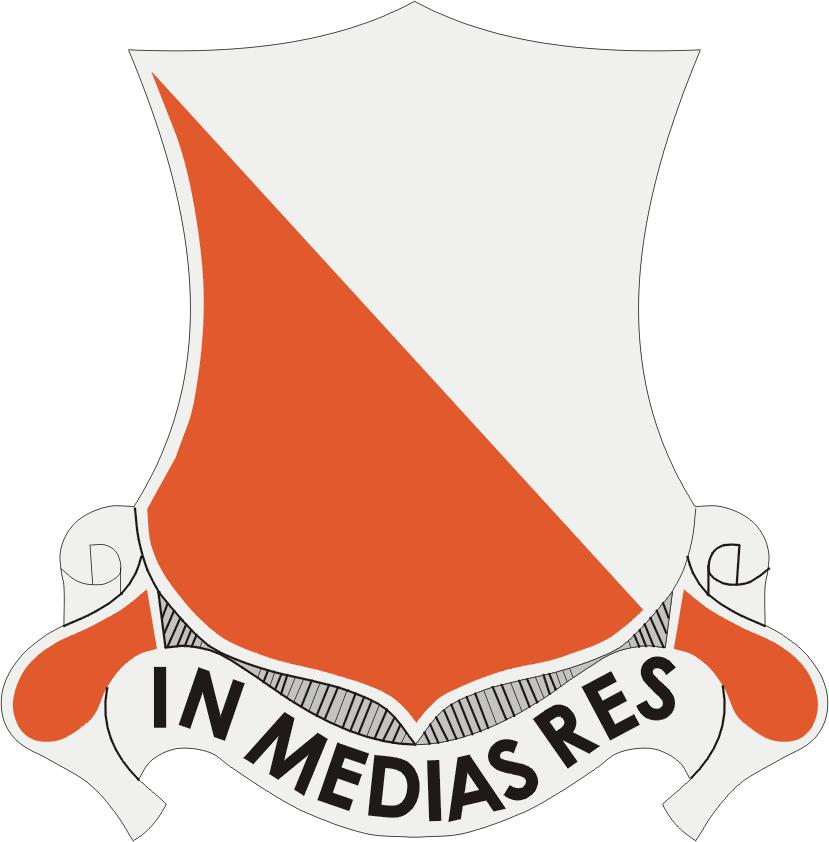
Arms of the 1st Signal Battalion: Per bend argent and tenné

Tenné (so blazoned) is found in the arms and colours of some U.S. military units, particularly in the Signal Corps, where the colour is shown as a bright shade of orange, and the Cavalry, where tenné is sometimes called "dragoon yellow".

The coat of arms of the 1st Signal Battalion, designed in 1932 by the U.S. Army Heraldic Program Office (since 1960 called the Institute of Heraldry) is per bend argent and tenné, since orange and white are the traditional colours of the Signal Corps. These colours are repeated in the arms of virtually every battalion in the Signal Corps.

The 1st Cavalry Regiment (also known as the 1st Regiment of Dragoons) was assigned a coat of arms by the Heraldic Program Office in 1921 featuring a gold dragon on a field of tenné. The 1st Cavalry was founded as the Regiment of United States Dragoons in 1833, and at the time the dragoon units wore a cord of tenné (which they called "dragoon yellow") and Or (gold). These are also the colours of the torse in the coat of arms of the unit.

== In popular culture ==
The Star Trek Star Fleet Technical Manual describes the official tunic color of Star Fleet Command Section standard issue uniforms, such as those worn by James Kirk and Hikaru Sulu, as "tenne". These are the tunics depicted on the actual show as yellow-gold fabric. Separate from this, officers of Captain's rank or higher may optionally wear tunics and dress uniforms greenish in hue; the Manual specifies this color as "olive."

== Examples ==
#86401A Brunâtre with hatching

#806E38 (left) Continental and #F08800 (right) English tenné

#FF6600 Orange with hatching

== See also ==
- Tawny (colour)
- Tawny port
- Orange (heraldry)
