= Roundel (heraldry) =

Heraldry term for a circular charge

The arms of Courtenay, dating from the start of the age of heraldry and still in use by the Earl of Devon today, display roundels of tincture gules: Or, three torteaux

A roundel is a circular charge in heraldry. Roundels are among the oldest charges used in coats of arms, dating from the start of the age of heraldry in Europe, circa 1200–1215. Roundels are typically a solid colour but may be charged with an item or be any of the furs used in heraldry. Roundels are similar to the annulet, which some heralds would refer to as a false roundel.

== Terms for roundels ==
In some languages, the heraldic roundel has a unique name specific to its tincture, based on the Old French tradition. This is still observed in English-language heraldry, which adopted terms from Old French for specific round items. Thus, while a gold roundel may be blazoned by its tincture, e.g., a roundel or, it is more often described as a bezant, from the Old French term besant for a gold coin, which itself is named for the Byzantine Empire.

The terms and their origin can be seen in the following table:

	Metals		Colours						
Tincture	Or	Argent	Gules	Azure	Sable	Vert	Purpure	Tenné	Sanguine or Murrey
Name	Bezant	Plate	Torteau	Hurt	Pellet	Pomme	Golpe	Orange	Guze
Depiction	A circle of gold	A circle of silver	A circle of red	A circle of blue	A circle of black	A circle of green	A circle of purple	A circle of orange	A circle of blood red A circle of maroon
Origin and meaning	Fr. besant, "gold coin"	Fr. plate, "silver (coin)"	Fr. torteau, "tart"	Eng. "hurtleberry" or Fr. heurt, "bruise"	Lat. "piletta," lead knob on the head of a blunted arrow	Fr. pomme, "apple"	Sp. golpe, "wound"	Eng. "orange (fruit)"	Eng. "eyeball", origin uncertain

A roundel vert ("green roundel") is known as a pomme, the French word for apple. It was frequently pluralised as pomeis – as in the Heathcote arms: Ermine, three pomeis, each charged with a cross or – but pommes is now more common. The term for a red roundel, torteau, is typically pluralised in the French manner as torteaux rather than torteaus, although torteaus is occasionally seen. A pellet may also be called an ogress; this term is possibly derived from oglys, a term for a cannonball.

In modern French-language blazonry, a roundel of any metal (Or or Argent) is a besant (being specified as a "besant d'or" or a "besant d'argent"), and a roundel of any colour is a tourteau (for instance, a blue roundel is a "tourteau d'azur"). However, an alternate naming system is occasionally used, with similar terms as English heraldry (plate for argent, heurte for azure (fr:azur), ogress for sable, pomme for vert (fr:sinople), guse for gules (fr:gueules), and gulpe for purpure (fr:pourpre)). Archaic names for roundels based on the French tradition are sometimes found in other languages, such as Spanish (see roel) and Portuguese (see arruela)

In German blazonry, the general word for a roundel is Kugel ("ball"); a roundel of silver can also be called Ball, and a roundel of gold Bille.

== Special roundels ==
The classic fountain with three rows each of argent and azure.

=== Fountain ===
One special example of a named roundel is the fountain, depicted as a roundel barry wavy argent and azure, that is, containing alternating horizontal wavy bands of blue and silver (or white). Because the fountain consists equally of parts in a light and a dark tincture, its use is not limited by the rule of tincture as are the other roundels. The traditional fountain in heraldry was a barry wavy of six, that is, with six alternating wavy rows of white and blue.

Another name for the fountain is the syke (Northern English for "well"). One of the most well-known and ancient uses of the fountain is in the arms of the Stourton family. Three fountains appear on the arms of County Leitrim, Ireland.

== Semy ==
In their earliest uses, roundels were often strewn or sown as seeds (Latin: semen, -inis, a seed) upon the field of a coat of arms, blazoned as semée/semy, an arrangement with numerous varieties. For example, a field semy of plates (i.e. roundels argent) could be blazoned platy; a field semy of pellets (i.e. roundels sable) could be blazoned pellety. The precise number and placement of the roundels in such cases were usually left to the discretion of the artist.

== See also ==
- Annulet (heraldry)
