= Murrey =

In heraldry, purple colour

- Class: Stain
- Non-heraldic equivalent: Mulberry, Maroon

Monochromatic designations
- Hatching pattern
- Tricking abbr.: m., M.

Poetic designations
- Heavenly body: Dragon's Tail
- Jewel: Sardonyx

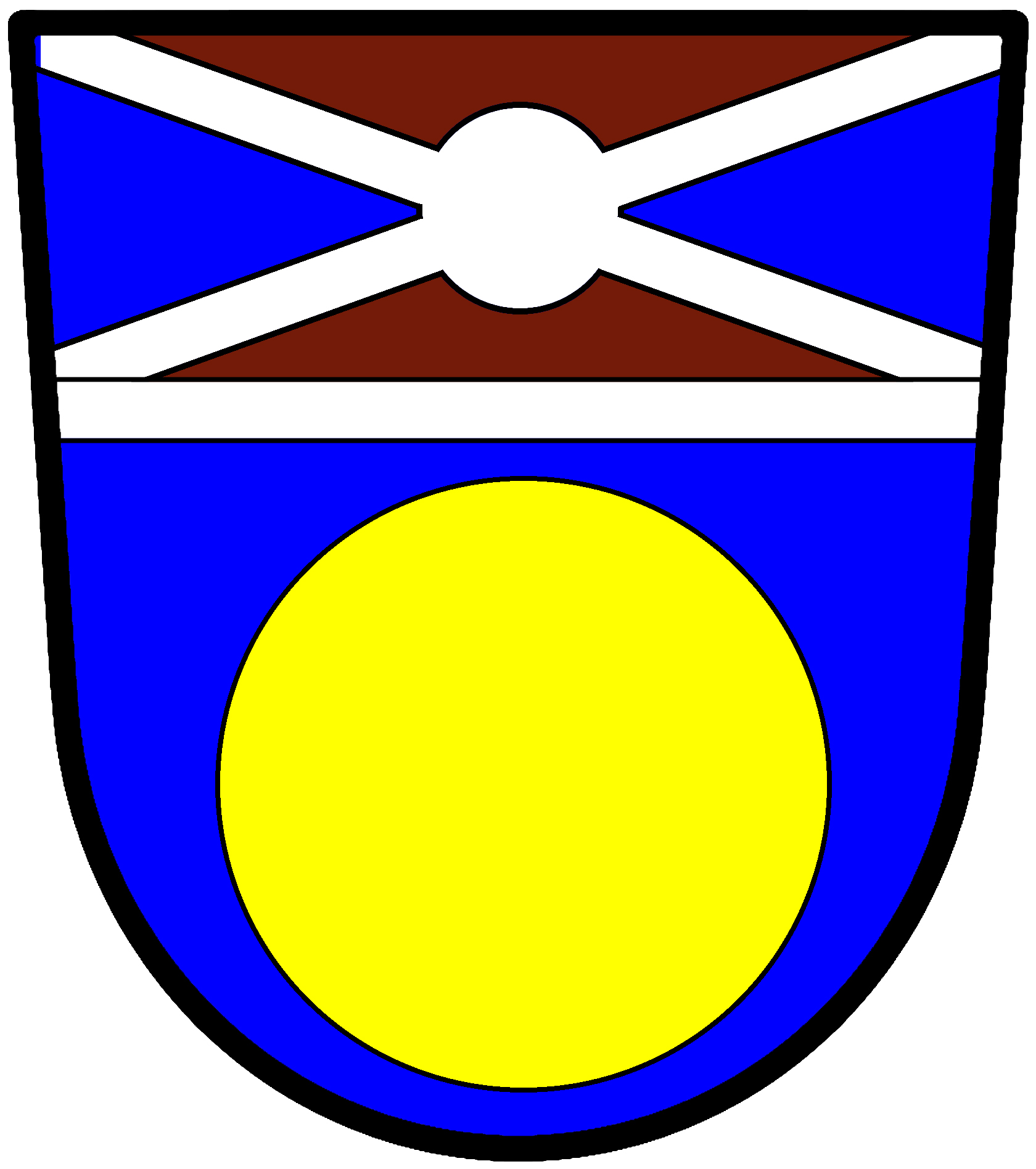
Murrey is used on these de Jong arms: Azure, a bezant; a chief per saltire, murrey and azure, filleted argent, over the partition a fillet saltire nowy, also argent.

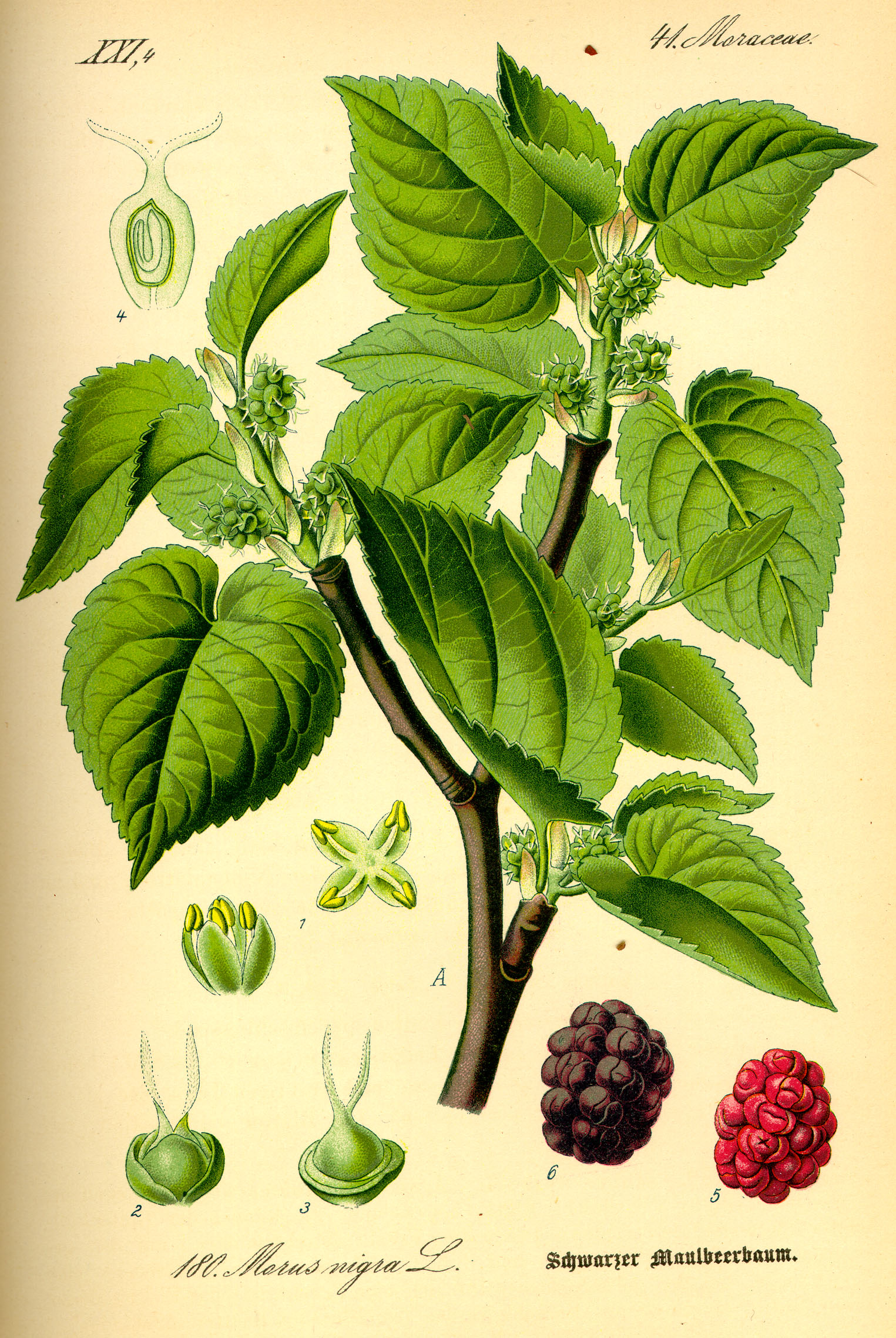
The name of the heraldic stain of murrey derives from the name of the mulberry, which is the fruit of the tree Morus nigra whose reddish purple colour murrey originally represented.

In heraldry, murrey is a "stain", i. e. a non-standard tincture, that is a dark reddish purple colour. It is most proximate in appearance to the heraldic tincture of purpure, but is distinct therefrom.

== Overview ==
According to dictionaries, "murrey" is the colour of mulberries, being somewhere between the heraldic tinctures of gules (red) and purpure (purple), and almost maroon; but examples registered in Canada and Scotland display it as a reddish brown.

== Poetic meanings ==
Centuries ago, arms were often described poetically and the tinctures were associated with different gemstones, flowers and heavenly bodies. Murrey usually corresponded to the following:

- Of jewels, the sardonyx
- Of heavenly bodies, the Dragon's Tail

== Examples ==
The livery colours of the House of York in England in the fifteenth century were azure and murrey, as depicted on the shields of the Falcon of the Plantagenets and the White Lion of Mortimer among the Queen's Beasts.

== See also ==
- Mulberry (color)
- Sanguine
- Stain (heraldry)
- Tenné
- Tincture (heraldry)
