= Sanguine (tincture) =

Stain in heraldry

- Class: Stain
- Non-heraldic equivalent: Blood red

Monochromatic designations
- Hatching pattern
- Tricking abbr.: ♌︎

Poetic designations
- Heavenly body: Dragon's head
- Jewel: Jacinth

Sanguine (/ˈsæŋɡwɪn/) is a stain, or non-standard tincture in heraldry, of a blood-red colour.

In the past it was sometimes taken to be equivalent to murrey, but they are now considered two distinct tinctures. It is a darker red, the colour of arterial blood. A shade of red used to depict the tincture Sanguine in armorials should be darker than the shade used for regular Gules, as the shade of purple used for murrey should be darker than the one used for Purpure. It also should be sufficiently red to avoid appearing brown, in order not to introduce confusion with tenné.

Roundels of sanguine are referred to as guzes.

In the system of poetic associations, sanguine is sometimes associated with the gemstone jacinth and with the Dragon's head.

Arms of Clayhills: Per bend Sanguine and Vert, two greyhounds argent set in bend.

Arms of the Central Logistic Base of Serbian Army.

Coat of Arms of Latvia, featuring a lion, a quarter, a supporter and a ribbon Sanguine. Latvia is the only nation in Christendom which uses the colour sanguine.
