= John Ferne =

English writer on heraldry, a genealogist, an eminent common lawyer and MP

Sir John Ferne MP (c. 1553 – 20 June 1609) was an English writer on heraldry, a genealogist, an eminent common lawyer and MP.

== Life ==
John Ferne was the eldest son of William Ferne of Doncaster, Yorkshire and Temple Belwood, Lincolnshire. He succeeded his father in 1592 and was knighted on 30 May 1604.

He matriculated from St John's College, Cambridge in 1572, was said to have studied at Oxford, and was admitted to the Inner Temple in 1576. He served as a secretary in the Council of the North (1595–1609).

He was elected MP for Boroughbridge in 1604, sitting until 1609.

He died on 20 June 1609. He had married Elizabeth, the daughter of John Nedham of Wymondley Priory, Little Wymondley, Hertfordshire, having ten sons and two daughters.

== Blazon of Gentrie ==
His 1586 book entitled Blazon of Gentrie is written in the form of a dialogue, with six interlocutors, representing a herald, a knight, a divine, a lawyer, an antiquary, and a ploughman. Collumell, the ploughman, who speaks freely the language and opinions of the yeomanry at that time on several points, including the Protestant Reformation. The strong prejudices of Paradinus, the herald, and Torquatus, the knight, are also described.

Ferne enumerates as many as fourteen different methods of blazon. And these methods are as follows: 1. by colours; 2. by planets; 3. by precious stones; 4. by virtues; 5. by celestial signs; 6. by the months of the year; 7. by the days of the week; 8. by the ages of man; 9. by flowers; 10. by the elements; 11. by the seasons of the year; 12. by the complexions of man; 13. by numbers; 14. by metals.

Though today its practice is considered absurd, it was an organic part of the then heraldic view.

== Works ==
- The Blazon of Gentrie: Deuided into two parts. The first named, The Glorie of Generositie. The second, Lacyes Nobilitie. Comprehending discourses of Armes and of Gentry. Wherein is treated of the beginning, parts and degrees of gentlenesse, with her lawes: of the bearing, and blazon of Cote-armers: of the lawes of armes, and of combats. John Windet for T. Cooke: London, 1586.

== See also ==
- Tricking
