= Mulberry (color) =

Shade of purple

The Mulberry variant used for Crayola crayons from 1958 to 2003.

Colour coordinates
- Hex triplet: #C54B8C
- sRGB^{B} (r, g, b): (197, 75, 140)
- HSV (h, s, v): (328°, 62%, 77%)
- CIELCh_{uv} (L, C, h): (50, 77, 341°)
- Source: Crayola
- ISCC–NBS descriptor: Strong purplish red
- B: Normalized to [0–255] (byte)

The colour mulberry is a representation of the colour of mulberry jam or pie, a darker colour than that of the fresh fruit. Terms describing interchangeable shades, with overlapping RGB ranges, include burgundy, claret and maroon.

The first recorded use of mulberry as a colour name in English was in 1776.

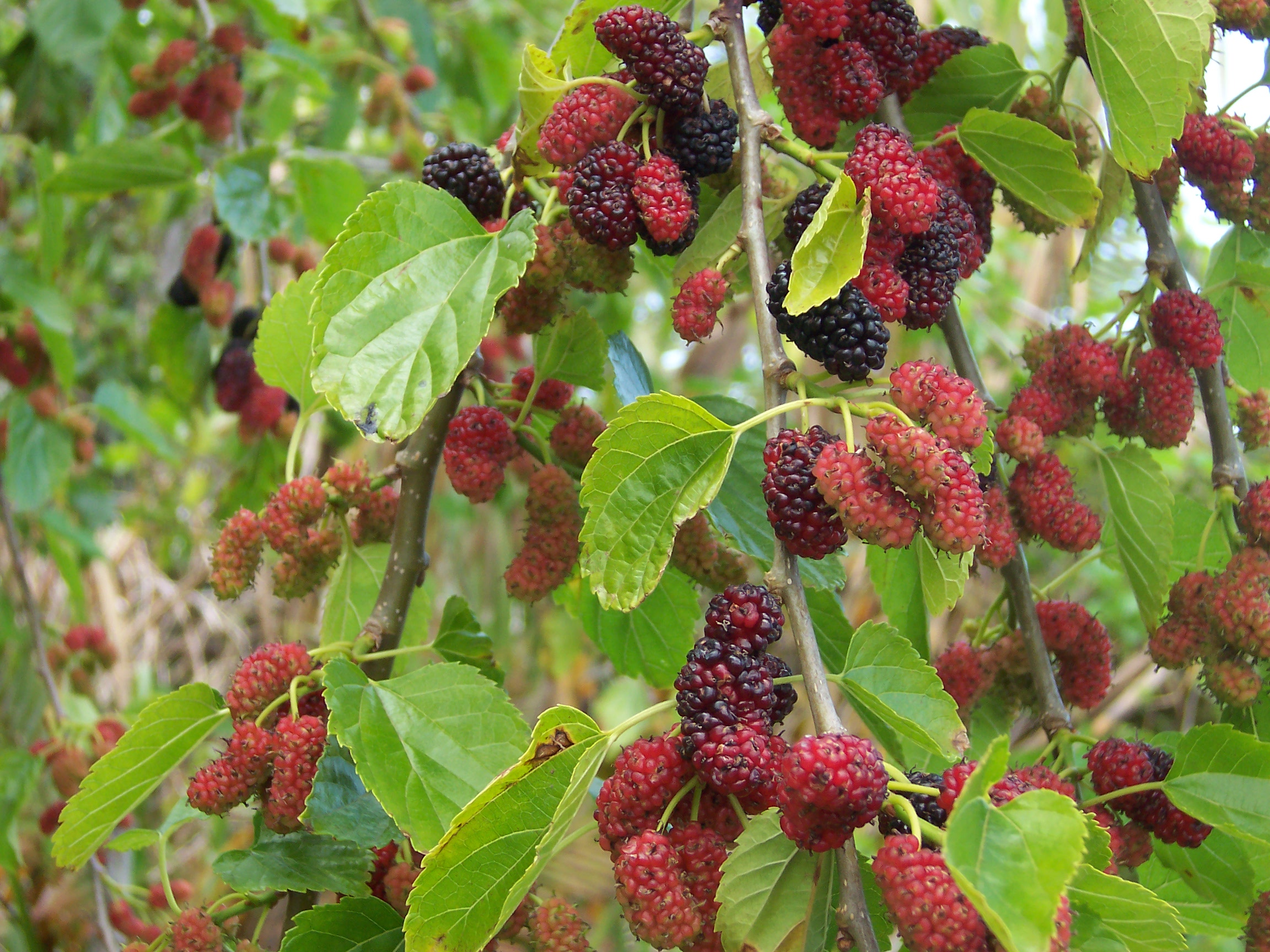
Mulberries

In some parts of Latin America the term is used for a lighter, redder raspberry tone.

== Commercial uses and variants ==
General Motors Holden released a model in the colour Mulberry. It was the 1979 SL/E Statesman.

Prismacolor also made a pencil after the colour mulberry, which was number 995.

== See also ==
- List of colours
- Murrey
