= Rule of tincture =

Rule of colour composition in heraldic design

The coat of arms of the Counts of Flanders is an early example of heraldry, dating back to at least 1224. The vast majority of armorial bearings from the early days of heraldry use only one colour and one metal, which would lead later heraldists to ponder the possibility that there was an unspoken rule regarding the use of tinctures.

The rule of tincture is a design philosophy found in some heraldic traditions that states "metal should not be put on metal, nor colour on colour". The rule has been widely adopted by heraldic authorities and has been described as 'definite' and 'practically unbreakable'. However, the rule has also over time been significantly read-down, both by a narrowing of that to which it applies, and by the adoption of many exceptions. Thus, heraldic furs (such as ermine and vair), and animals and other charges represented "proper" (in their natural colours), are generally exempt from the rule of tincture. Certain elements of full heraldic achievements (for example, crests, supporters), and a variety of components in coats of arms (for example, bordures or animals' claws), are not covered by the rule.

== History ==
Speculation about a rule regarding the use of tinctures first appeared in the Argentaye tract, a heraldic treatise dated to 1410. The Liber Armorum, dated to c. 1440, and the Blason des Couleurs, dated to c. 1440–1450, also mention the rule of tincture. This rule was purely conjectural on the heraldists' part. An earlier text, the 1340 treatise De Heraudie, makes no mention of the rule, even when discussing armorial bearings that violate the supposed rule. Other 14th-century authors, like Bartolo and Johannes de Baudo Aureo, do not mention the rule either.

A modern hypothesis argues that it was simply impractical to paint colour over colour and inlay metals in metals with the tools available to early medieval artisans. The simplest application, the theory suggests, would be to paint a single colour over a metal shield. This practical limitation of the early medieval period was misinterpreted three centuries later as the so-called rule of tincture.

Regardless, by the late 17th century the rule of tincture had gained a foothold in many countries, and was proving particularly popular in Great Britain and France. By the Victorian era, the rule of tincture was considered de facto heraldic law in England, but strict adherence to the rule proved to be impractical as arms became more complicated. Victorian heralds devised several technical exemptions to the rule of tincture during this period; these dispensations survive to this day as "lawful exemptions" to the rule.

In modern times, the rule of tincture has been adopted by virtually all heraldic authorities and societies.

== Application and exceptions ==
Proponents of the rule of tincture argue that the main duty of a coat of arms is to be easily recognisable, and that certain tincture pairs are difficult to distinguish when placed atop or over each other. Critics argue that the exceptions are so numerous that the rule is virtually meaningless. The rule of tincture as described by Humphrey Llwyd in 1568 states that "metal should not be put on metal, nor colour on colour". The heraldic metals are or (gold) and argent (silver), and the colours are sable, gules, azure, vert, and purpure. The stains are considered colours for the purposes of the rule. The rule of tincture does not apply to furs, nor to charges that are displayed in their natural tinctures and blazoned "proper". The rule of tincture also does not apply when a charge is composed of both a colour and metal, and can be placed on a field of either a colour or metal.

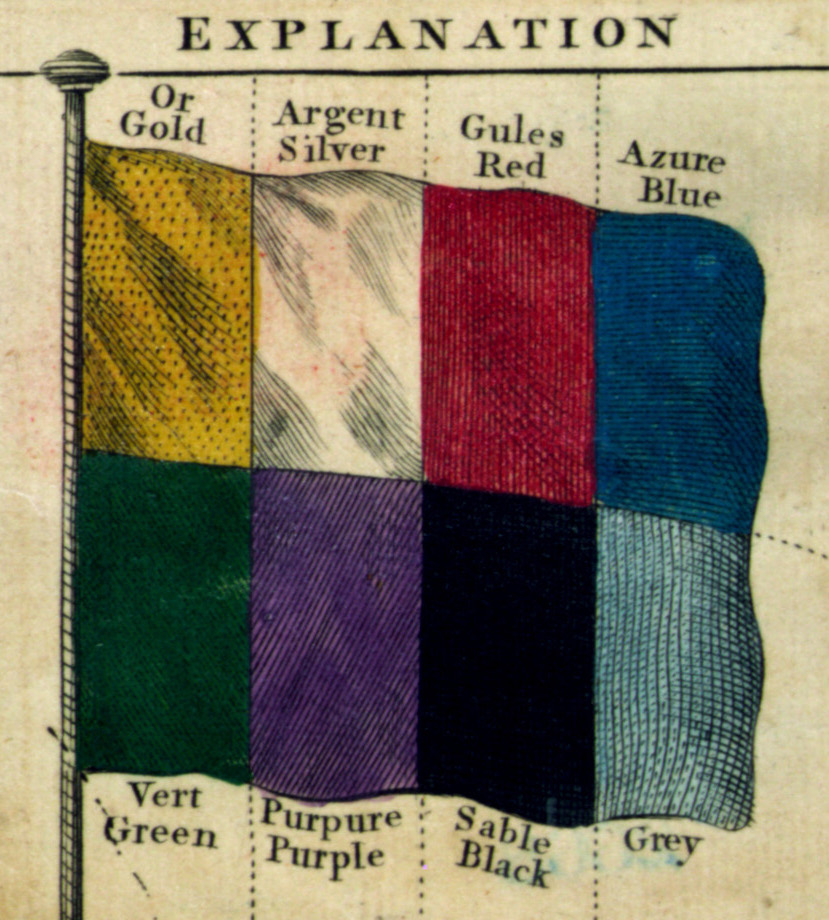
An explanation of the heraldic tinctures with their common names

Simple divisions of the field are considered to be beside each other, not one on top of the other, so the rule of tincture does not apply. A field party or patterned of a colour and a metal may have a charge of either colour or metal placed upon it. Likewise, a charged divided party or patterned of a colour and metal may be placed on either a colour or a metal field.

Fimbriation, the surrounding of a charge by a thin border, is often used to circumvent what would otherwise be a violation of the rule. In French heraldry a divise is a thin band added just beneath a chief to prevent violations, which is similar to the fillet in English heraldry. Boutell exempts bordures from the rule of tincture.

The rule of tincture does not apply to the claws, horns, hooves, and tongues of animals. Fox-Davies wrote that, "A lion rampant and any other beast of prey is usually represented in heraldry with the tongue and claws of a different colour from the animal. If it is not itself gules, its tongue and claws are usually represented as of that colour, unless the lion be on a field of gules. They are then represented azure, the term being 'armed and langued' of such and such a colour." Furthermore, Fox-Davies wrote that "the distinction between white and silver is marked, and a white label upon a gold lion is not metal upon metal." The same is true of white upon argent or yellow upon Or, when blazoned as such, even though argent and Or are commonly depicted as white and yellow respectively in heraldry.

Another violation which is usually not worried about is a green mount on a blue field representing the sky, and some of the methods of depicting the sea, waves or the like are similarly treated. A vert (green) trimount also appears in the coat of arms of Hungary (shown below), against in this case a field gules (red). The rule of tincture should preclude this use of a vert (green) trimount. However, it has been argued by some that the mount vert or trimount issues from the base of the shield rather than being a charge on it, causing the rule not to apply.

Marks of cadency, marks of distinction, augmentations, and abatements are also exempted from the rule. Similarly, a baronet is entitled to display a canton or inescutcheon argent charged with a hand couped gules regardless if such a mark violates the tincture rule. According to Fox-Davies, the rule of tincture also does not apply to crests or supporters, except in such cases as the crest or supporter itself is treated as a field and charged with one or more objects.

== Violations ==
One of the armes à enquérir, often erroneously said to be the only example, is the armorial bearings attributed to the Kingdom of Jerusalem.

The rule of tincture is so closely followed in Great Britain and France that arms that violate the rule are called armes fausses or armes à enquérir. Likewise, in Italian heraldry violations are referred to as per inchiesta. Any violation is presumed to be an invitation to inquire how the armorial bearings came to include a violation of the tincture rule.

An example of "colour on colour" is the arms of Albania (shown below), with its two-headed eagle sable (black) on a field gules (red). However, some writers in Central and Eastern European heraldry consider sable to have properties of both a metal and a colour, not exclusively a colour as it is in Western Europe, so that black-on-colour combinations are not uncommon.

This rule is perhaps most often violated by a chief, leading some commentators to question whether the rule should apply to a chief, or even whether a chief should be considered a charge at all rather than a division of the field. These violations usually occur in the case of landscape heraldry and augmentations. French civic heraldry, with its frequent chiefs of France (i.e. "Azure, three fleurs-de-lys or", anciently "Azure, semée-de-lys or"), often violates this rule when the field is of a colour.

The coat of arms appearing on the famous tapestry of The Lady and the Unicorn (Paris, c.1500) was until recently attributed by specialists to the older branch of the family Le Viste, Jean IV Le Viste, but it curiously blatantly breaks the rules of French heraldry. A new study of the tapestry suggests the probability of the intervention of a descendant of the younger branch, Antoine II Le Viste, as a sponsor of the tapestry, and indicates that the incorrect superposition of colours could have been a mere difference.

In French heraldry, the term cousu ("sewn") is sometimes in blazon used to get around what would otherwise be a violation of the rule; though this is used generally, occasionally a distinction is drawn between the cousu of colour on colour and the soudé ("soldered") of metal on metal, though this has fallen from fashion to a large degree.

== Gallery ==
The historical coat of arms of Samogitia may date back to the 14th century, several centuries before the rule was codified.

The coat of arms of Albania is based on a design that dates back to the 15th century, three centuries before the rule of tincture was widely adopted.

The historical arms of Galicia and Lodomeria display a raven proper on a colour, which would be exempt, but also has a gules fesse on an azure field, which is not.

The arms of Szczecin are exempt from the rule of tincture because the crowned griffin's head is of a colour and metal.

Coat of arms of Hungary, with a trimount vert on a field gules.

Coat of arms of Slovakia, based on that of Hungary, with a trimount azure on a field gules

The arms of Trøndelag place a cross Or on an argent field, violating the rule of tincture by placing metal on metal.

Coat of arms of the Sitwell family, blazoned as "Barry of eight or and vert, three lions rampant sable". The rule of tincture does not apply to a varied field.

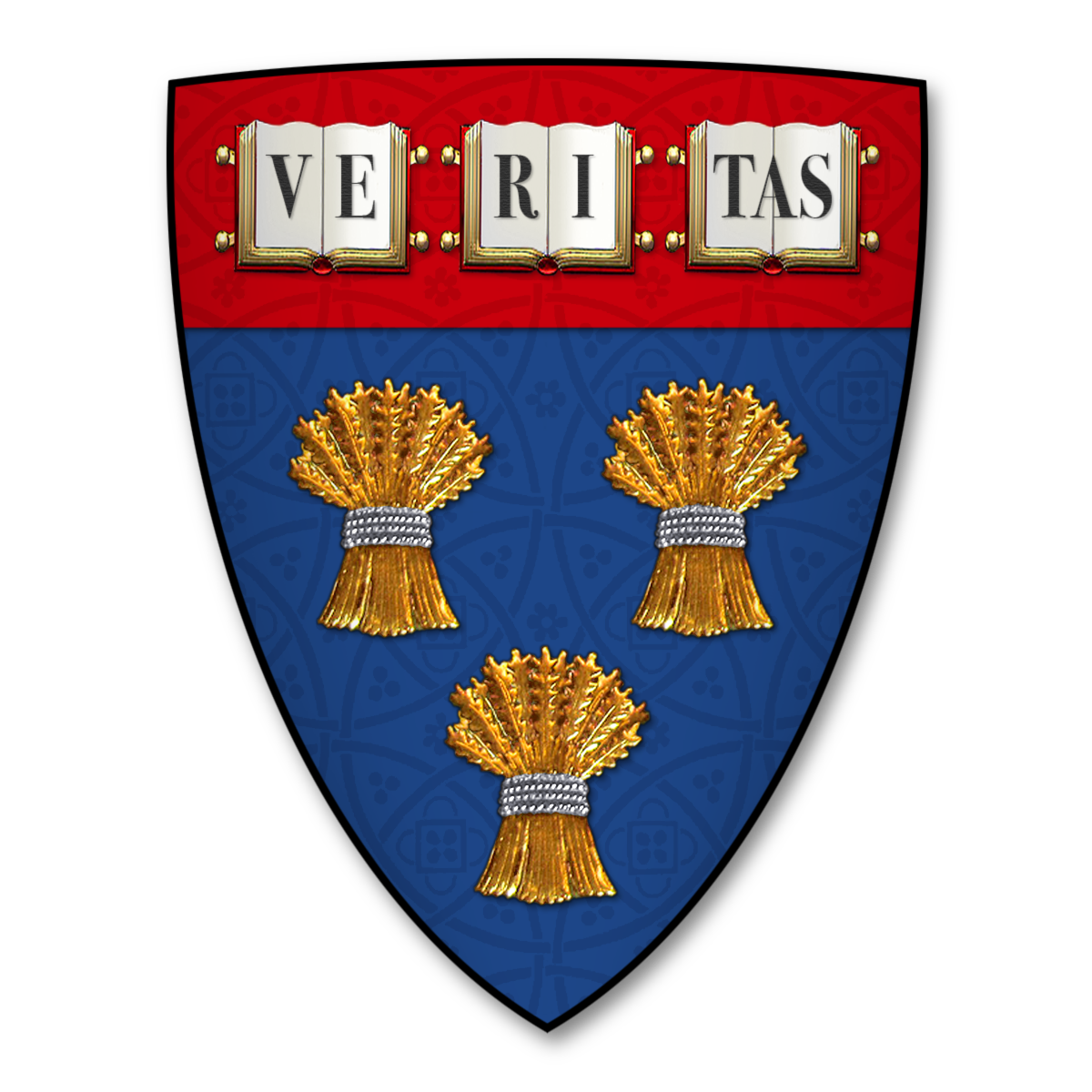
The now-retired arms of Harvard Law School use a chief gules on a field azure. Chiefs are the most commonly found violation to the rule of tincture.

== Sources ==
- Balfour Paul, James (1893). An Ordinary of Arms Contained in the Public Register of All Arms and Bearings in Scotland. William Green and Sons.
- Boutell, Charles and A. C. Fox-Davies (2003). English Heraldry. Kessinger Publishing. ISBN 0-7661-4917-X.
- Fox-Davies, Arthur Charles and Graham Johnston (1978). A Complete Guide to Heraldry. New York: Bonanza Books. ISBN 0-517-26643-1.
- Heim, Bruno Bernard (1994). Or and Argent. Gerrards Cross, UK: Van Duren. ISBN 0-905715-24-1.
- Llwyd of Denbigh, Humphrey (c1568). Dosbarth Arfau.
- Neubecker, Ottfried (1997). Heraldry: Sources, Symbols and Meaning. London: Tiger Books International. ISBN 1-85501-908-6.
- Spener, Philip Jacob (1690). Insignium Theoria. Frankfurt. Library of Congress record.
- Woodcock, Thomas and John Martin Robinson (1988). The Oxford Guide to Heraldry. Oxford: Oxford University Press. ISBN 0-19-211658-4.
