= Burgundy (color) =

Purplish, dark-red color

- European Union passports are usually burgundy in color (Danish passport shown here)

Color coordinates
- Hex triplet: #800020
- sRGB^{B} (r, g, b): (128, 0, 32)
- HSV (h, s, v): (345°, 100%, 50%)
- CIELCh_{uv} (L, C, h): (26, 79, 7°)
- Source: Maerz and Paul
- ISCC–NBS descriptor: Purplish red (pR)
- B: Normalized to [0–255] (byte)

Burgundy is a purplish, dark-red color. The name comes from the Burgundy wine in France. The word "burgundy" is not usually capitalized.

Terms describing akin shades, with overlapping RGB ranges, include wine red, crimson, maroon and mulberry. The color burgundy is also similar to Bordeaux (Web color code #4C1C24), Merlot (#73343A), Berry (#A01641), and Redberry (#701f28).

Burgundy is made of 50% red, 0% green, and 13% blue. The CMYK percentages are 0% cyan, 100% magenta, 75% yellow, and 50% black.

The first recorded use of "burgundy" as a color name in English was in 1881.

== Variations ==
=== Vivid burgundy ===
Vivid Burgundy

Color coordinates
- Hex triplet: #9F1D35
- sRGB^{B} (r, g, b): (159, 29, 53)
- HSV (h, s, v): (349°, 82%, 62%)
- CIELCh_{uv} (L, C, h): (35, 91, 7°)
- ISCC–NBS descriptor: Vivid red
- B: Normalized to [0–255] (byte)

In cosmetology, a brighter tone of burgundy, called vivid burgundy, is used for coloring hair.

=== Old burgundy ===
Old Burgundy

Color coordinates
- Hex triplet: #43302E
- sRGB^{B} (r, g, b): (67, 48, 46)
- HSV (h, s, v): (6°, 31%, 26%)
- CIELCh_{uv} (L, C, h): (22, 11, 18°)
- ISCC–NBS descriptor: Dark reddish brown
- B: Normalized to [0–255] (byte)

The color old burgundy is a dark tone of burgundy. The first recorded use of old burgundy as a color name in English was in 1926.

== See also ==
- Auburn (color)
- RAL 3005 Wine red
- Wine (color)
- Wine color, various colors of wine
