= Gore (heraldry) =

Heraldic charge consisting of two connected inward curves

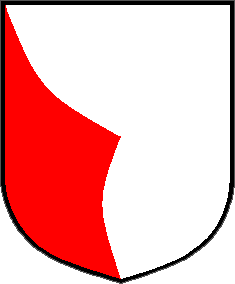
A gore. The blazon of this shield is argent, a gore gules.

In heraldry, a gore is a charge formed by two inwardly curved lines starting from the dexter chief (the viewer's upper left) corner and the middle base point and meeting in the fess point (lower center).

== Background ==
Traditionally, the image is formed with two inwardly curved lines starting from the dexter chief corner and the middle base point and meeting in the fess point (lower center).

The same charge upon the sinister side of the shield (for the viewer, the right side) is called a gore sinister. A gore sinister tenné was considered to be an abatement of arms imposed upon the bearer for cowardice in the face of the enemy, though there is no record of its actual use.
