= Bleu celeste =

Tincture

- Class: Non-standard colour
- Non-heraldic equivalent: Sky blue

Monochromatic designations
- Hatching pattern

Poetic designations

Blue celeste tincture

Bleu celeste (/ˌbluː səˈlɛst/, "sky blue") is a rarely occurring and non-standard tincture in heraldry (not being one of the seven main colours or metals or the three staynard colours). This tincture is sometimes also called ciel or simply celeste. It is depicted in a lighter shade than the range of shades of the more traditional tincture azure, which is the standard blue used in heraldry.

Generally considered to be European rather than English or Scottish, after the First World War it started to appear in England in arms and badges relating to the Royal Air Force, though it is still doubtful if any more than a dozen examples could be found in British heraldry, and most British heralds consider it unheraldic. While in the post-World War I period bleu-celeste is depicted as a darker shade, in prior times it was depicted as very light, and has even been treated as a metal, as azure charges have been placed on a bleu celeste field, and vice versa.

Regardless, bleu celeste is still used by heraldic authorities, such as Britain's College of Arms in London, with one example of the arms of Jacob Flamberg being granted in 2016 using bleu celeste in the blazon for the field, mantling and charge, in each case per pale/party with sable.

"Per pale Bleu Celeste and Sable on a Fess wavy between three Plum Trees eradicated Argent a Wolf courant per pale Sable and Bleu Celeste langued and armed Gules" and "Party Bleu Celeste and Sable doubled Argent"

Bleu celeste can also be seen in the arms of Israel and Peru and also in the arms of former Canadian Governor General Ray Hnatyshyn. In the arms of the University of Natal Athletic Union the azure is defined as "sky blue".

== Light blue ==
The supporters of the arms of the London Borough of Richmond upon Thames: On either side a Griffin Gules armed and beaked Azure each supporting an Oar proper the blade of the dexter Dark Blue and that of the sinister Light Blue.

In addition to bleu celeste, there is also an apparently unique example in British heraldry of the use of "light blue" in the Municipal Borough of Barnes, through which the Oxford versus Cambridge boat race passes on the Thames. The arms show the respective blades of the teams' oars, coloured dark Oxford blue and light Cambridge blue, and may be blazoned thus:

Azure, on a saltire Or between four ostrich feathers argent, two oars in saltire proper, the blade of that to the dexter dark blue and that to the sinister light blue.

When in 1965 that borough merged with its neighbours to form the Borough of Richmond upon Thames, the coloured oars were transferred to the supporters in the arms of the new borough.

== See also ==
- Columbia blue
- Carolina blue
- Sky blue
- Tekhelet
- Tincture (heraldry)
