= Stain (heraldry) =

In heraldry, non-standard tincture or colour

In heraldry, a stain (sometimes termed stainand colour or staynard colour) is one of a few non-standard tinctures or colours (namely murrey, sanguine, and tenné), which are only known to occur in post-medieval heraldry and may be used as part of a rebatement of honour. However, in heraldic practice almost none of these rebatements are in fact found; and in British heraldry the stains find only exceptional use, other than for purposes of livery.

== Murrey ==
Murrey in color & hatching

Murrey (deriving from late Middle English, via Old French from Medieval Latin moratus, from morum 'mulberry') is mulberry-coloured, or reddish purple. The murrey colour used in coats of arms & armorials should be clearly darker than purpure and stand out from it, to approximately the same extent that sanguine is darker than Gules and brunâtre from tenné. A good comparison between the two tinctures could be obtained from comparing the murrey in the coat of arms of the University of Wales, with the lion purpure adorning the coat of arms of the Kingdom of León.

== Sanguine ==
Sanguine in color & hatching

Sanguine (deriving from Middle English, from French sanguin(e) 'of blood', from Latin sanguineus 'of blood', from sanguis, sanguin- 'blood') is a brownish red, or blood-red colour. It is due to be darker than Gules, the regular red, from approximately the same extent as murrey to purpure, and brunâtre from tenné.

It can also be used for the depiction of animals said écorché ('scorched') in French heraldry, although this is very rarely used among the already rare occurrences of blazons depicting bleeding animals, on which the regular Gules is used instead.

== Tenné ==
Tenné in color & hatching

Tenné (deriving mid-16th century from an obsolete French variant of Old French tané) (sometimes termed tawny) is an orange-tawny colour, though orange is considered distinct in continental European and African heraldic traditions. Called tanné in modern and actual French heraldry, it refers to the leather tanning process and to the color the finished product is said to have, hence the name tanné ('tanned'). Being the initial shade of brown available by itself in heraldry, its hatching form naturally took the shape of red and green lines mixed together. Tenné is expected to be slightly darker than Gules, clearly darker than orange, but lighter than brunatre (dark brown), sanguine (dark red), murrey (dark purple) & sable (black).

== Historical examples ==
Flag of the Second Spanish Republic (1931–1939)

- The University of Wales, established in 1893, adopted a coat of arms blazoned: Argent on a fesse murrey three medieval lamps Or all within a bordure of the second charged with eight mullets of the third.
- The flag of the Second Spanish Republic, adopted in 1931, was a tricolor of gules, or, and murrey (Spanish: roja, amarilla y morada).

== See also ==
- Orange (heraldry)

== Bibliography ==
- Fox-Davies, A. C. (1909). A Complete Guide to Heraldry. (2004 edition) Whitefish, MT: Kessenger Publishing. ISBN 1-4179-0630-8 LCCN 09-23803
