= Fimbriation =

Small stripe of colour around common charges or ordinaries, in heraldry and vexillology

The coat of arms of New South Wales uses white fimbriation

In heraldry and vexillology, fimbriation is the placement of small stripes of contrasting colour around common charges or ordinaries, usually in order for them to stand out from the background, but often simply due to the designer's subjective aesthetic preferences, or for a more technical reason (in heraldry only) to avoid what would otherwise be a violation of the rule of tincture. While fimbriation almost invariably applies to both or all sides of a charge, there are very unusual examples of fimbriation on one side only. Another rather rare form is double fimbriation (blazoned "double fimbriated"), where the charge or ordinary is accompanied by two stripes of colour instead of only one. In cases of double fimbriation the outer colour is blazoned first. The municipal flag of Mozirje, in Slovenia, show an example of fimbriation that itself is fimbriated.

Fimbriation may also be used when a charge is the same colour as the field on which it is placed. A red charge placed on a red background may be necessary, for instance where the charge and field are both a specific colour for symbolic or historical reasons, and in these cases fimbriation becomes a necessity in order for the charge to be visible. In some cases, such as a fimbriated cross placed on a field of the same colour as the cross, the effect is identical to the use of cross voided, i.e. a cross shown in outline only.

According to the rule of tincture, one of the fundamental rules of heraldic design, colour may not be placed on colour nor metal on metal. (In heraldry, "metal" refers to gold and silver, frequently represented using yellow and white respectively. "Colour" refers to all other colours.) Sometimes, however, it is desired to do something like this, so fimbriation is used to comply with the rule.

Flag of South Africa, showing yellow and white fimbriation

In vexillology that is not specifically heraldic, the rules of heraldry do not apply, yet fimbriation is still frequently seen. The reason for this is largely the same as the reason for the heraldic rule of tincture: that is, the need for visibility — the separation of darker colours by white or yellow is an aid to the visual separation of the darker colours. A notable example of a flag which uses fimbriation is the national flag of South Africa which is fimbriated in white above and below the central green area, and in yellow between it and the triangle at the hoist.

Though fimbriation is, heraldically, intended to be used to separate areas that are both colours (by the use of a metal) or both metals (by the use of a colour), occasionally flags may be found which use fimbriation in non-standard ways. One example of this is the flag of the Faroe Islands, which separates a red cross from a white field with blue fimbriation. Another example of this non-standard fimbriation is one flag of the United Tribes of New Zealand, which separates areas of blue and red with black fimbriation. The flag of Uzbekistan also uses this form of "pseudo-fimbriation" - it adds a thin red band between a colour and a metal, separating blue (above) and green (below) from a central white stripe.

Some 15 to 20 countries use fimbriation on their national flags. National flags that use fimbriation include those of Trinidad and Tobago, North Korea, Botswana, Kenya and - most famously - the British Union Flag. On this last flag the fimbriation is unusual, as a white fimbriation separates a blue field from a red cross (representing England) but also from a divided red and white saltire (the red representing Ireland and the white representing Scotland). The white fimbriation along the white part of the saltire - possibly unique in vexillology - is responsible for the famous "lopsidedness" of the Union Jack, giving it the appearance of having a red saltire fimbriated more widely on one side than the other.

== Flags using fimbriation ==
Flag of Åland (Finland)

Flag of American Samoa (United States)

Flag of Botswana

Flag of Burundi

Flag of the Democratic Republic of the Congo

Flag of Eswatini

Flag of the Faroe Islands (Denmark)

Flag of the Gambia

Flag of Iceland

Flag of Kenya

Flag of Mississippi (United States)

Flag of Mozambique

Flag of Namibia

Flag of New Zealand

Flag of North Korea

Flag of Norway

Flag of Saint Kitts and Nevis

Flag of the Solomon Islands

Flag of South Africa

Flag of South Sudan

Flag of Suriname

Flag of Tanzania

Flag of Trinidad and Tobago

Flag of the United Kingdom

Flag of Uzbekistan

Flag of Vanuatu
