= La Neuville-Roy =

- Commune
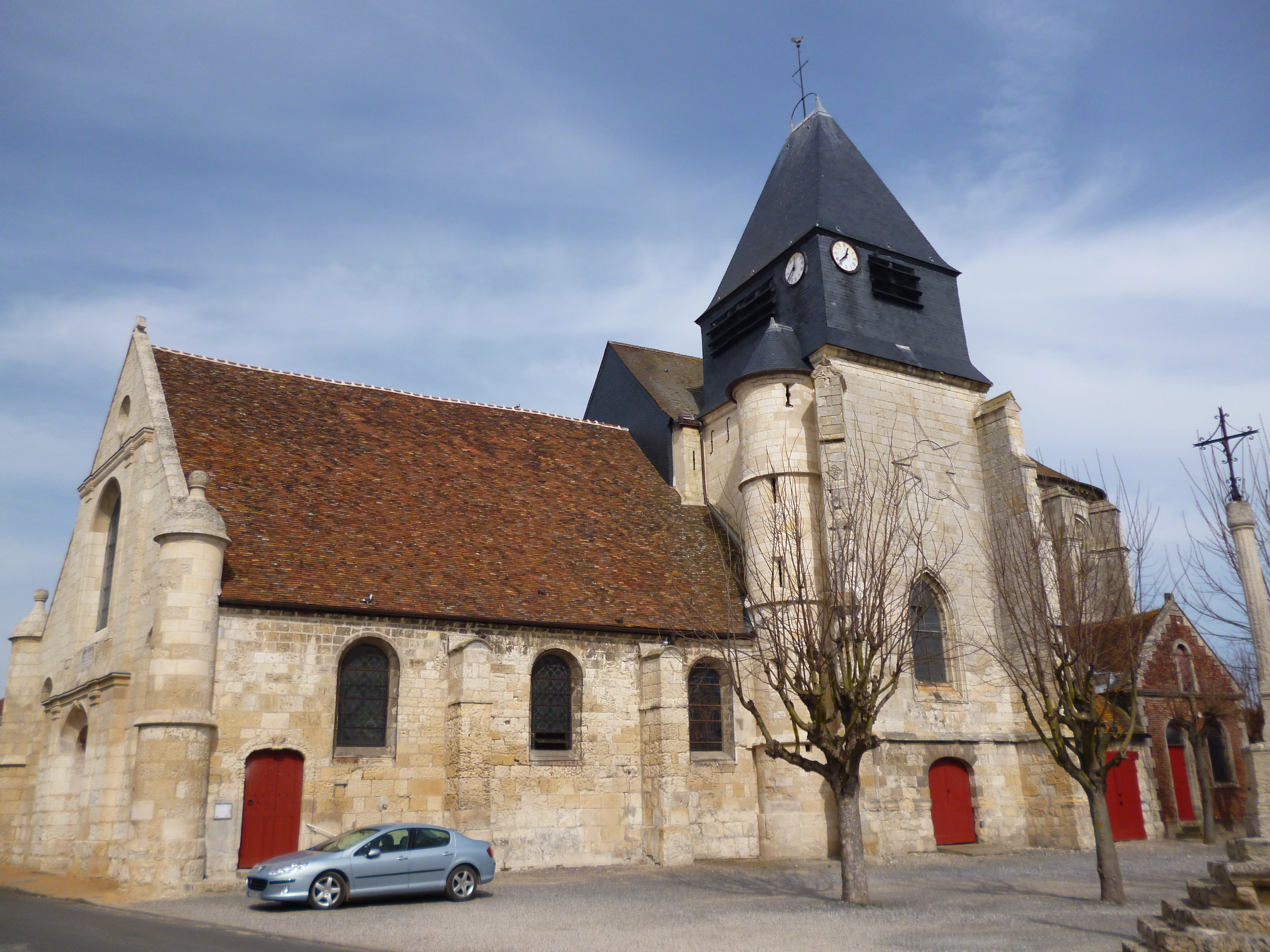
- The church in La Neuville-Roy
- Location of La Neuville-Roy
- Location within France Location within Hauts-de-France
- Coordinates: 49°28′58″N 2°34′41″E
- Country: France
- Region: Hauts-de-France
- Department: Oise
- Arrondissement: Clermont
- Canton: Estrées-Saint-Denis
- Intercommunality: Plateau Picard

Government
  - Mayor (2020–2026): Thierry Michel
- Area^{1}: 12.49 km^{2} (4.82 sq mi)
- Elevation: 110 m (360 ft)
- Highest elevation: 119 m (390 ft)
- Lowest elevation: 68 m (223 ft)
- Population (2023): 897
  - Density: 71.8/km^{2} (186/sq mi)
- Time zone: UTC+01:00 (CET)
  - Summer (DST): UTC+02:00 (CEST)
- INSEE/Postal code: 60456 /60190
- ^{1} French Land Register data, which excludes lakes, ponds, glaciers > 1 km^{2} (0.386 sq mi or 247 acres) and river estuaries.

La Neuville-Roy (French pronunciation: [la nøvil ʁwa]) is a commune in the Oise department in northern France.

The commune was formerly called Laneuvilleroy and was officially renamed La Neuville-Roy on 26 August 2004.

== See also ==
- Communes of the Oise department
