= Abatement (heraldry) =

Defacement of a coat of arms

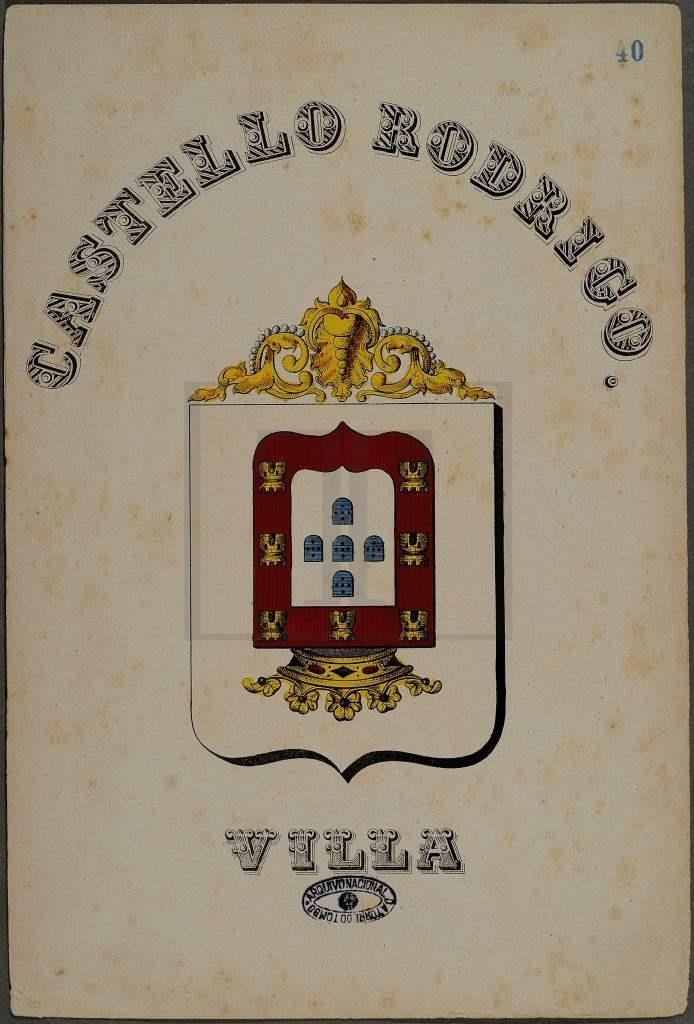
The old coat of arms of the Portuguese town of Castelo Rodrigo, consisting of the coat of arms of Portugal inverted for the town's treachery in the 1383–1385 Crisis

An abatement (or rebatement) is a modification of a coat of arms, representing a less-than honorable augmentation, imposed by an heraldic authority (such as the Court of Chivalry in England) or by royal decree for misconduct. The practice of inverting the entire escutcheon of an armiger (a holder of a coat of arms) found guilty of high treason has been attested since the Middle Ages and is generally accepted as reliable, and medieval heraldic sources cite at least one instance of removing an honourable charge from a coat of arms by royal decree as an abatement of honour. Other abatements of honour implied by the addition of dishonourable stains and charges, appearing in late 16th-century texts, have never been reliably attested in actual practice. Additionally, as many heraldic writers note, the use of arms is not compulsory, so armigers are more likely to relinquish a dishonored coat of arms than to advertise their dishonor.

== Inverted arms ==
The earliest mention in heraldic writing of a dishonorable display of arms (and, according to Fox-Davies, the only one reliably attested in actual use; see historical examples below) was inverting the entire shield, first documented by Johannes de Bado Aureo in his heraldic treatise Tractatus de armis (c. 1394). Contemporary accounts of executions for treason describe the traitor being marched to his execution in a paper tabard displaying his inverted arms, and other accounts tell of displaying the inverted arms of prisoners, released on parole, who refuse to pay their ransom.

Note that inverted arms can also indicate the death of the holder, and do not necessarily indicate dishonour.

== Theoretical abatements ==
Eight other abatements were introduced in the late 16th century, each prescribing a specific charge in a specific stain for a specific offense; though the charges themselves were uncommon but no less honourable than any other charge (if colored in any standard tincture or fur), it was only when displayed in the prescribed position and stain that these charges were supposed to be considered dishonourable.

Leigh (1562) enumerated the nine abatements thus:

1. Point dexter parted tenné, for false claims of valor
2. Point champaine tenné, for killing a prisoner who has demanded quarter (ie, asked for mercy)
3. Plain point sanguine, for one who lies to his sovereign
4. Point in point sanguine, for cowardice
5. Gusset sanguine borne to dexter, for adultery, or to sinister for a drunkard [a truncation of the shield]
6. Gore sinister tenné, for cowardice in the face of the enemy
7. Delf [shovelful of earth] tenné, for revoking a challenge
8. Inescutcheon reversed sanguine, for any man who "discourteously entreateth eyther maid or widow against her will, or flieth from his Soveraignes banner"
9. The entire escutcheon inverted, for treason

Scottish herald Thomas Innes of Learney mentioned abatements in marital situations: "The law of arms provides for abating the arms of an adulterer by two gussets sanguine, and where the bearing of arms is necessary this, and one gusset (they will be close-gussets) for non-adulterous divorcees, are, at least in Patents, applied in the case of divorcees."

Several notable modern heraldists have asserted that the execution of this system of abatements has never been attested in fact, and that the whole system was in all likelihood a theoretical exercise created by heralds for the purpose of discouraging armigers from committing dishonourable acts.

== Breaking or erasing charges ==
A lion couard is said to denote dishonor or cowardice.

As another form of abatement, some coats of arms were reportedly modified through breaking or cutting, reversing, or altogether erasing some existing charges, at least as they occur in patents, though the armiger's actual display of these defaced arms has not been documented and is unlikely.

In French heraldry the term diffamé is used to denote a lion or other animal whose tail is cut off, or may refer more broadly to arms which have been altered to signify loss of honor. A lion with its tail between its hind legs is termed "couard" (coward), and has also been cited as a mark of infamy.

Heraldic lions are traditionally depicted with male genitals, and a recent trend toward omitting the genitals has been controversial, prodding claims that emasculated lions have also been an historical form of abatement. Commenting on the newly castrated lion in the arms of the Nordic Battle Group in 2007, Vladimir Sagerlund, heraldic artist at the Swedish National Archives since 1994, was critical of the politically motivated decision, stating, "once upon a time coats of arms containing lions without genitalia were given to [imposed upon] those who betrayed the Crown." The Times in London, however, noted a growing recent trend toward heraldic "castration", pointing to the lions passant on the royal coat of arms of England, as well as the lions rampant on those of Norway, Finland, Belgium, Luxembourg and Scotland, all of which have recently been depicted without genitals. The Times concluded that "some crests are ambiguous, but the message remains clear: the lions are supposed to display courage and nothing else." Obviously such modifications of arms are clearly not intended as an abatement in modern times, but rather a refinement of the depiction of charges and the like to comport with modern values (eg, non-sexism). Further, no known examples of castrated lions have been found in medieval heraldry, so it may be that (heraldic) emasculation was not such a common or major deal even historically.

== Reported historical examples ==
A few examples of historical abatements of arms have been recorded, though none of these reflect the addition of stained ordinaries as detailed above. Rather, these include broken chevrons, disarmed lions, and reversed or erased charges.

One of these rare historical examples was Amery of Pavy, who was appointed governor of Calais by King Edward III of England in 1347, and whose arms were abated by royal decree in 1349 after the failed French siege of Calais on the last day of December 1348, which resulted from Sir Amery's attempt to sell Calais to Sir Geffrey Charney, the French governor of nearby Saint-Omer, for 20,000 crowns. As stated by Sir George Mackenzie: "And Edward the Third of England ordained two of six stars which a gentleman had in his arms to be effaced, because he had sold a seaport of which he was made governor." Pursuivant of arms John Guillim, writing circa 1610, gave the story in considerable detail, adding that Sir Amery's arms were also inverted for his treachery. Guillim further explained that this humiliation is not inherited by the traitor's heirs, up to and including capital crimes, except in cases of high treason.

An example of a lion diffamée is that of Jean d'Avesnes who insulted his mother, Margaret II, Countess of Flanders, in the presence of King Louis IX. He is supposed to have seen the lion in his arms diffamée (i.e. the tail removed) and morné (i.e. the teeth and claws removed).

== See also ==
- Augmentation of honour
- Bend sinister (heraldry)
- Gore (heraldry)
- Gusset (heraldry)
- Stain (heraldry)
- Shame pole
