= Fountain (heraldry) =

Roundel with wavy white and blue stripes

A fountain is depicted like this in heraldry. A roundel barry wavy Argent and Azure.

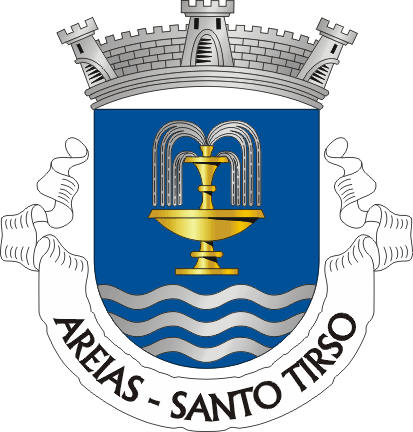
This charge, seen in continental heraldry (above, used in a Portuguese communal coat of arms), must be called a naturalistic fountain in English blazons

Fountain or syke is in the terminology of heraldry a roundel depicted as a roundel barry wavy argent and azure, that is, containing alternating horizontal wavy bands of silver (or white) and blue. Traditionally, there are six bands: three of each tincture.

Because the fountain consists equally of parts in a metal and a colour, its use is not limited by the rule of tincture as are the other roundels. The fountain may be made in any heraldic tinctures, but unless otherwise stated, it is silver/white and blue.

If the blazon of a coat of arms contains the word fountain, it is not a natural, water-gushing fountain which should be depicted but a roundel like this.

== Examples ==
The arms of former town of Anjalankoski, Finland

The canting arms of Fontenay-le-Fleury, France, displays a fountain in gold and red and fleurs-de-lis

The canting arms of Il-Fontana, Malta

Arms of County Leitrim, Ireland, with three fountains

Arms of Götene Municipality in Sweden

Arms of Nairobi, Kenya
