= Orange (tincture) =

Heraldic tincture

In heraldry, orange is a tincture, rarely used other than in Catalan, South African, French municipal and American military heraldry. As a colour, Orange should be used against metals in order not to contravene the rule of tincture. Orange is distinct not only from Gules (red), but also from Tenné (or Tanné), which originated as the light-brownish colour of tanned leather, and from Carnation, used for the depiction of white human skin.

Orange was not allocated a pattern in the system of hatching developed in the early 17th century, but later received one in the form of a series of vertical lines of dots and dashes (a hybrid of the vertical lines used to represent Gules, and the dots used to represent Or).

The orange colour used in heraldry should be rich and deep enough to be clearly distinguished from both metals, Argent (white) and Or (yellow), and from Gules (red), Tenné (light brown) and Carnation (flesh-colour).

== Gallery ==
Arms of commune Lamorlaye, France.

Coat of arms of the Lagouanelle-Dély family.

Arms of the commune Tavel, Gard, France.

Arms of the commune Monchy-sur-Eu, France.

Arms of the commune Margny-les-Compiègne, France

Arms of Bellefontaine, France.

Arms of Le Sap, France

Arms of Brullioles, Rhône, France.

Coat of arms of Armenia, bearing an escutcheon orange overall.

Arms of Saint-Honoré, Québec.

Arms of Anthy-sur-Léman, French Savoy.

Arms of Hugleville-en-Caux, Normandy, featuring a leaf orange.

Arms of Saint-Martin-du-Manoir, Normandy.

Coat of arms of La Chapelle-du-Bois-des-Faulx, Eure, featuring an orange flower.

Arms of Sorquainville, Normandy, featuring a cow argent with spots orange.

Faultive arms of Andelu, Yvelines, France, featuring a roundel orange.

Arms of Camps-la-Source, Provence, featuring the Cross orange on the lilies of France.

Arms of Coutarnoux, Burgundy, featuring a castle orange.

Arms of Lichères-près-Aigremont, in Burgundy

=== On flags ===
==== Current national ====
Flag of Armenia

Flag of Bhutan

Flag of the Cherokee Nation

Flag of Côte d'Ivoire

Flag of Ireland

Flag of the Marshall Islands

Flag of Niger

Flag of Sri Lanka

Flag of Zambia

==== Current governmental ====
Royal Standard of the Netherlands

Netherlands Coast Guard flag

Flag of the Royal Netherlands Air Force

Governmental flag of the Royal Netherlands Army

Flag of the United States Federal Aviation Administration

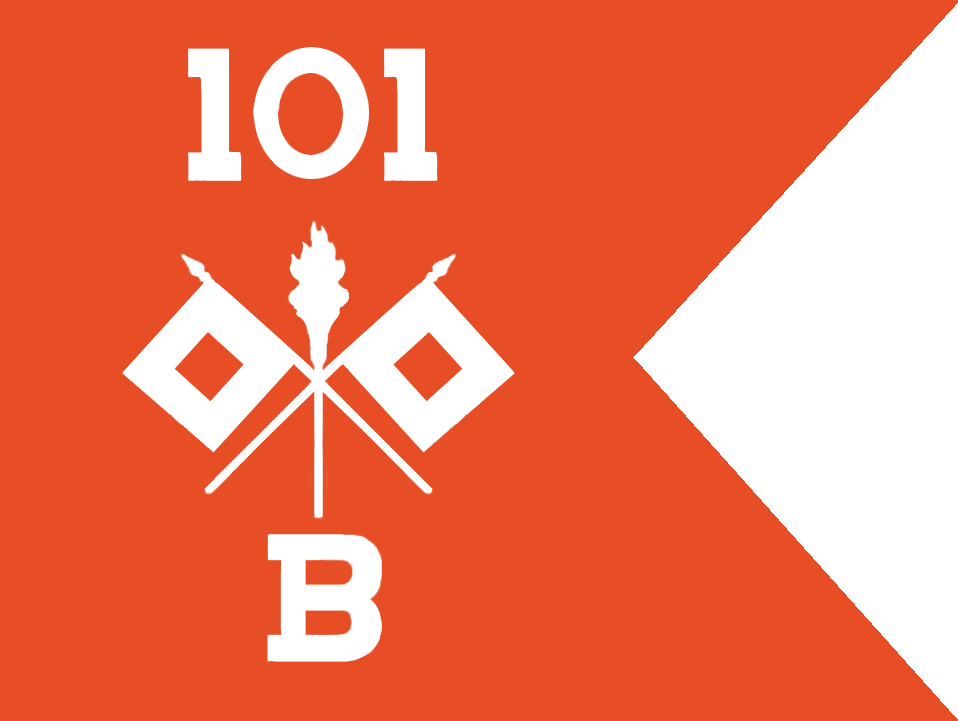
Guidon of the United States Army Signal Corps

==== Historic national ====
Prince's Flag (Prinsenvlag), Netherlands

Flag of the Duchy of Nassau (1806-1866)

Flag of the former Orange Free State (1857 to 1902)

Flag of South Africa (former, 1928-1982)

Flag of the President of South Africa (former, 1984–1994)

Flag of the former Republic of Anguilla (1967–1969)

Flag of the Maratha Empire

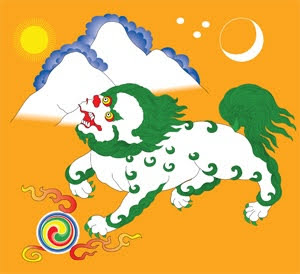
Flag of Tibet (former, 1920-1925)

==== Current subnational ====
Flag of the Tierra del Fuego Province, Argentina

Flag of the Northern Territory, Australia

Flag of the Department of Vaucluse, Provence-Alpes-Côte d'Azur, France

Flag of Bali, Indonesia

Flag of Fukushima Prefecture, Japan

Flag of Nagano Prefecture, Japan

Flag of Mandalay Division, Myanmar

Flag of Akwa Ibom State, Nigeria

Flag of Sokoto State, Nigeria

Flag of Azad Kashmir, Pakistan

Flag of New Ireland Province, Papua New Guinea

Flag of Cojedes State, Venezuela

==== Current municipal ====
Flag of Ashkelon, Israel

Flag of Kfar Saba, Israel

Flag of Rishon LeZion, Israel

Flag of Fukushima, Fukushima, Japan

Flag of Ora, Gunma, Japan

Flag of the city of Nara, Nara Prefecture, Japan

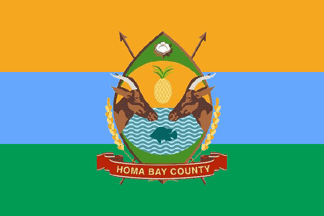
Flag of Homa Bay County, Kenya

Flag of Cusco, Peru

Flag of Lima, Peru

Flag of Orania, South Africa

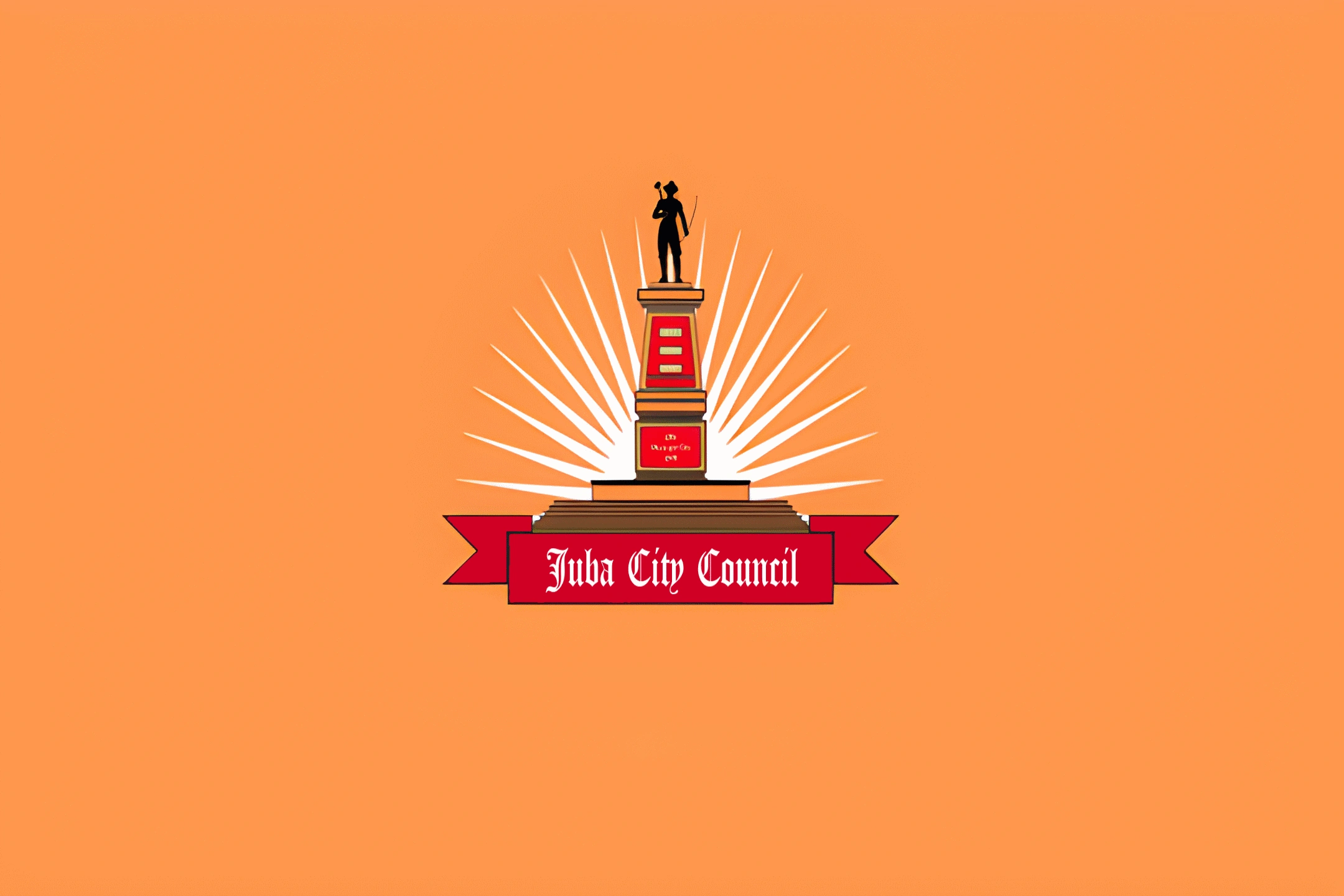
Flag of Juba, South Sudan

Flag of Orange County, California, US

Flag of San Jose, California, US

Flag of Miami, Florida, US

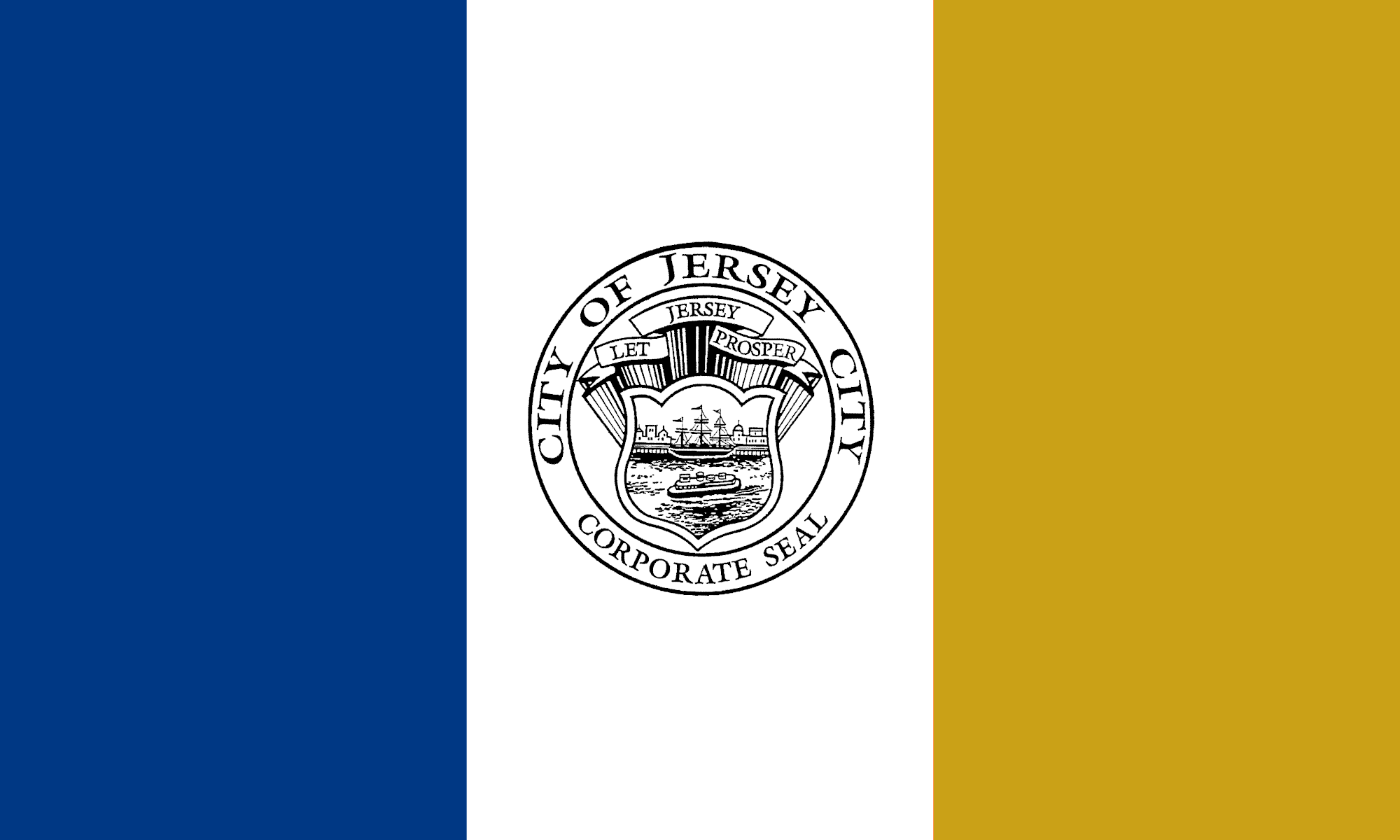
Flag of Jersey City, New Jersey

Flag of Albany, New York, US

Flag of Nassau County, New York, US

Flags of New York City, New York, US

Flag of Borough of the Bronx, New York City, New York, US

Flag of the Borough of Manhattan, New York City, New York, US

Flag of Schenectady County, New York

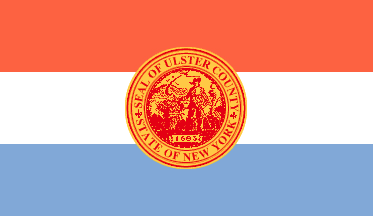
Flag of Ulster County, New York

Flag of Westchester County, New York

==== Current social and political ====
Buddhist flag

Flag of Buddhism in Thailand

A flag of the Chagossians

Flag of the Christian Democratic Union of Germany

Flag of the Social Democratic Party of Portugal

Flag of the Orange Order

Flag of the Orange Order in Canada

Rainbow flag (LGBT)

Wiphala

==== Other ====
House flag of the former South African Marine Corporation (1969-2020)

Whitney Smith's Flag of Antarctica
(proposed)

== See also ==
- Orange (colour)
- Tenné
