= Maruéjols-lès-Gardon =

- Commune
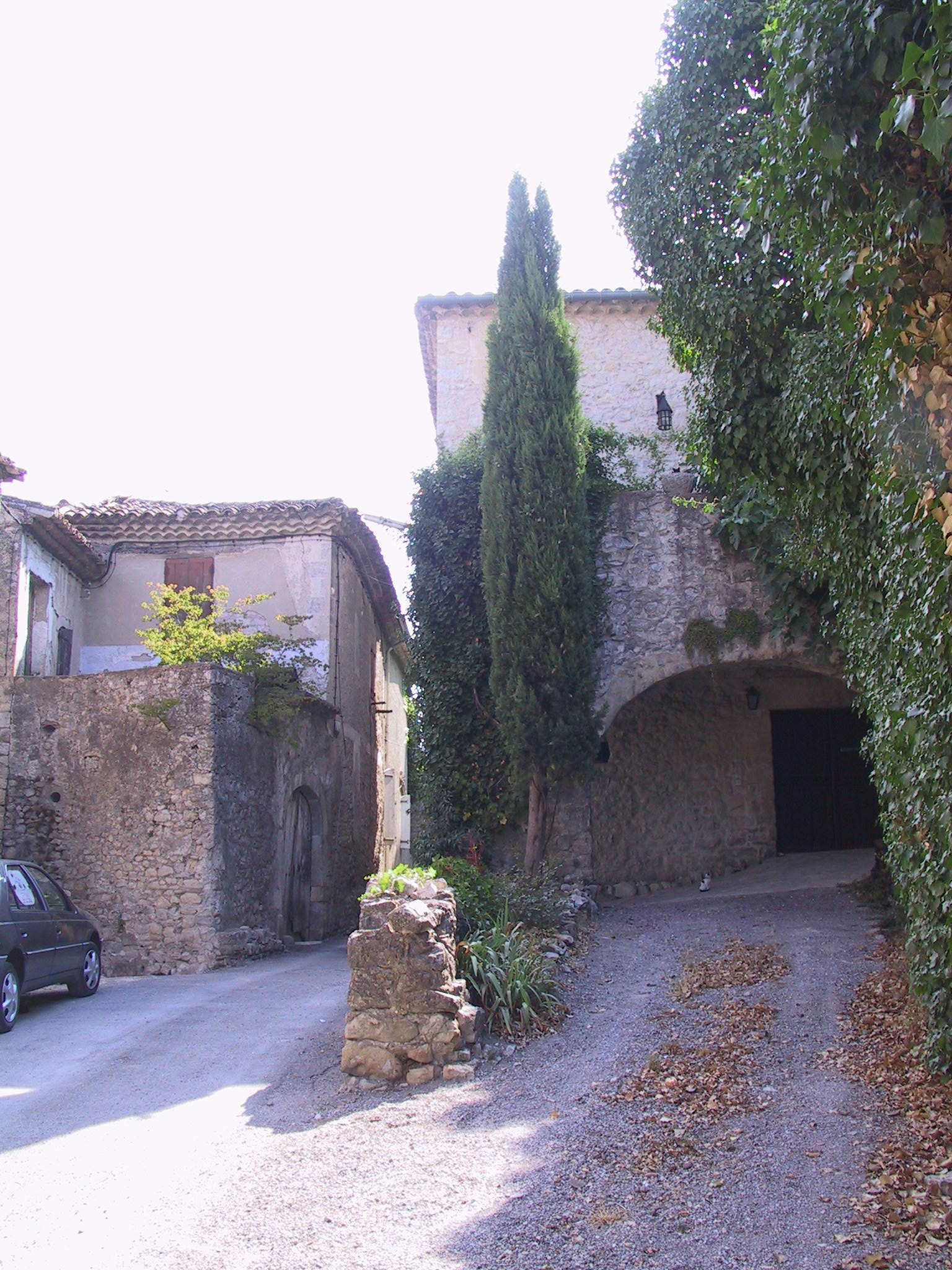
- A view of Maruéjols

- Coat of arms
- Location of Maruéjols-lès-Gardon
- Location within France Location within Occitanie
- Coordinates: 44°00′23″N 4°07′54″E
- Country: France
- Region: Occitania
- Department: Gard
- Arrondissement: Le Vigan
- Canton: Quissac
- Intercommunality: Piémont Cévenol

Government
  - Mayor (2020–2026): Freddy Felix
- Area^{1}: 3.82 km^{2} (1.47 sq mi)
- Elevation: 101 m (331 ft)
- Highest elevation: 220 m (720 ft)
- Lowest elevation: 84 m (276 ft)
- Population (2023): 259
  - Density: 67.8/km^{2} (176/sq mi)
- Time zone: UTC+01:00 (CET)
  - Summer (DST): UTC+02:00 (CEST)
- INSEE/Postal code: 30160 /30350
- ^{1} French Land Register data, which excludes lakes, ponds, glaciers > 1 km^{2} (0.386 sq mi or 247 acres) and river estuaries.

Maruéjols-lès-Gardon is a commune in the Gard department in southern France.

== Population ==
Historical population
Year	Pop.	±% p.a.
1968	152	—
1975	143	−0.87%
1982	149	+0.59%
1990	161	+0.97%
1999	144	−1.23%
2007	179	+2.76%
2012	247	+6.65%
2017	243	−0.33%
2023	259	+1.07%
Source: INSEE

== See also ==
- Communes of the Gard department
