= Flaunch =

Heraldic charge consisting of two mirrored circular arcs

Argent flaunches gules

In heraldry, a flaunch (/flɔːntʃ/; also called flanches or flanks) is among the ordinaries or subordinaries, consisting of two arcs of circles protruding into the field from the sides of the shield. The flaunch is never borne singly.

Plain flaunches are seen in the coats of Hulbert Paul Lindahl Silver and Gillian Patricia Birtwhistle. They may be of different tinctures, as in the coat of the Free State Women's Agricultural Union (South Africa) where they are orange/tenny and azure.

Flaunches may touch each other, as in the coat of Bradley Hook.

Like any ordinary, they may

- be charged with other things, as in the English coats of Harlow District Council and Forest of Dean District Council.
- have colourings other than plain ones, as in the English coat of Hoylake Urban District Council and the Canadian one of the Central Saanich (British Columbia) Police Service.
- have ornamented edges, as in the Welsh coat of Maesteg Town Council.

A very rare variation is square flaunches, as in the coat of Sheila-Marie Suzanne Cook and the coat of the US Coastguard Cutter Sequoia. Parker's glossary, s.v. Flaunches, cites two similar coats for Mosylton or Moselton with square flaunches.

== Diminutive ==
While supposedly the diminutives of flaunches are flasques and voiders (which likewise cannot be borne singly), these exist only very rarely in modern heraldry, and in practice cannot be distinguished from flaunches. An example occurs in the coat of Liddell-Grainger of Ayton (second quarter for Liddell), "Argent fretty gules; two voiders or;..." (Scots Public Register, volume 38, page 3).

== As a debruisement ==
Some early heraldic writers say that the illegitimate son of a noblewoman must bear her arms with "a surcoat"; that is, on (large) flaunches around a blank center.

== Gallery ==
Flag of Kenya

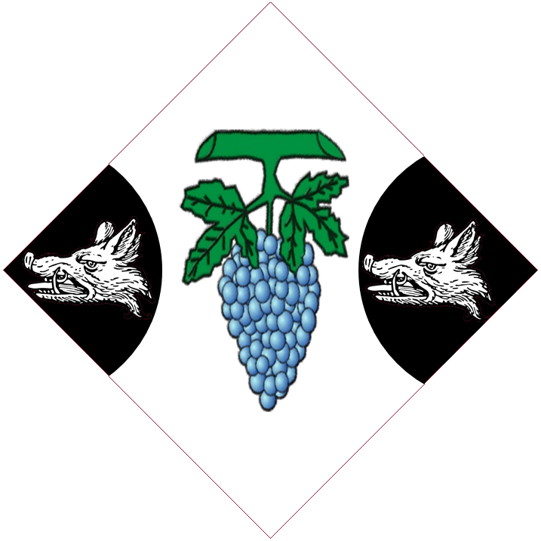
Arms of Mary Anne Disraeli, Viscountess Beaconsfield: it contains two flaunches sable each charged with a boar's head erased argent
