= Purpure =

Heraldic tincture

- Class: Colour
- Non-heraldic equivalent: Purple

Monochromatic designations
- Hatching pattern
- Tricking abbr.: p., pu., purp.

Poetic designations
- Heavenly body: Mercury
- Jewel: Amethyst
- Virtue: Temperance

In heraldry, purpure (/ˈpɜːrpjʊər/) is a tincture, equivalent to the colour purple, and is one of the five main or most usually used colours (as opposed to metals). It may be portrayed in engravings by a series of parallel lines at a 45-degree angle running from upper right to lower left from the point of view of an observer, or else indicated by the abbreviation purp.

Banner used during the reign of Alfonso VII of León (1105-1157)

Purpure has existed since the earliest periods, for example in the purpure lion of the arms of León; at that time, it was painted in a greyer shade. However, it has never been as common as the other colours, and this has led to some controversy as to whether it should be counted among the common colours. In French heraldry, the colour is usually excluded from the common colours as well as considered "ambiguous" (could be either colour or metal), and Finnish heraldry restricts its use to certain additaments.

There is at least one instance of it being blazoned as "Imperial Purple". One of the most expensive colours to acquire in ancient times, Tyrian purple was used in the war banner of Byzantine Emperor Komnenos: Purpur (porphyr red) a double-headed eagle displayed Or.

== Poetic meanings ==
The different tinctures are traditionally associated with particular heavenly bodies, precious stones, virtues, and flowers, although these associations have been mostly disregarded by serious heraldists. Purpure is associated with:

- Of jewels, the amethyst
- Of heavenly bodies, Mercury (however, Western alchemy associates the amethyst with Jupiter). The planet Mercury is further associated with the element mercury or "quicksilver" in traditional alchemical/occultistic lore.
- Of virtues, temperance

== Gallery ==
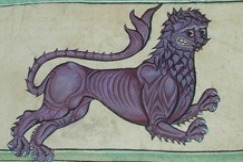
Arms of the Kingdom of León, displayed in the Tumbo A manuscript.

Arms of Mauves-sur-Loire city (Loire-Atlantique)

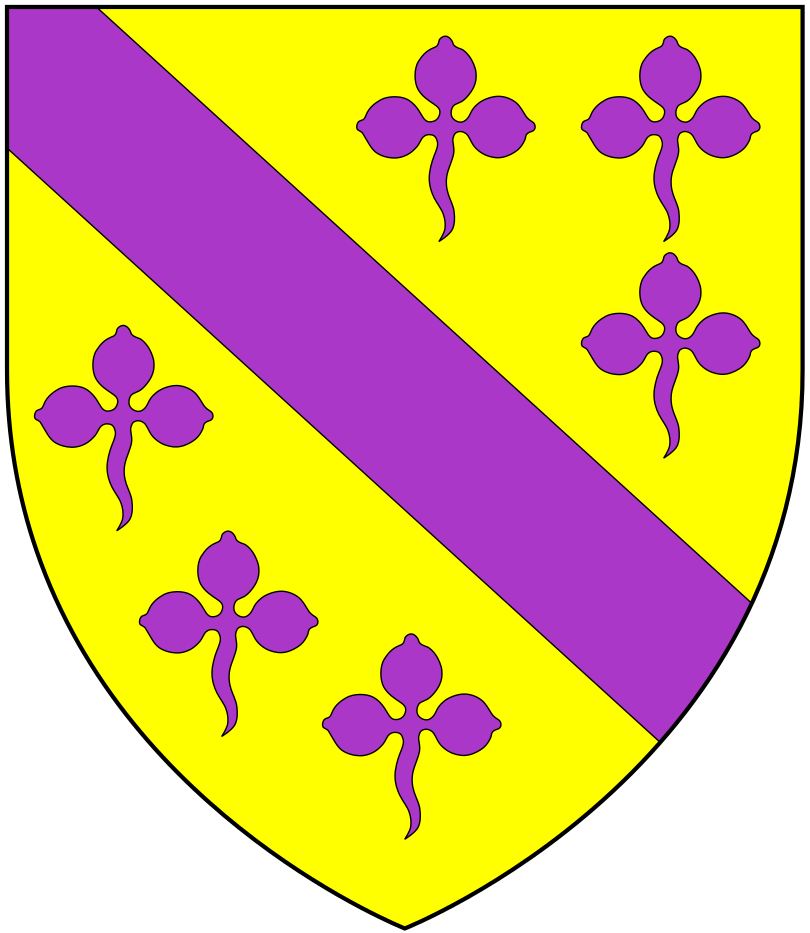
Arms of Hakewill of Exeter, Devon.

Coat of arms of the former Dutch municipality of Zijpe.

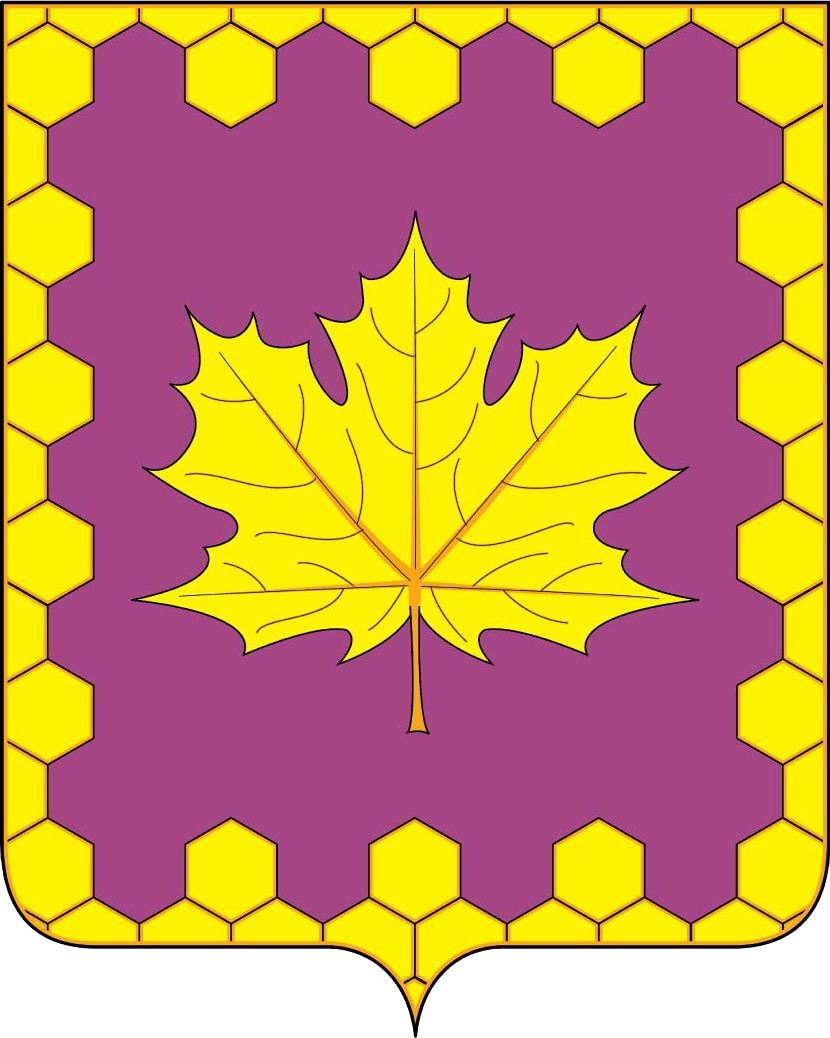
Coat of Arms of Klyonovskoe settlement (Moscow, Russia).

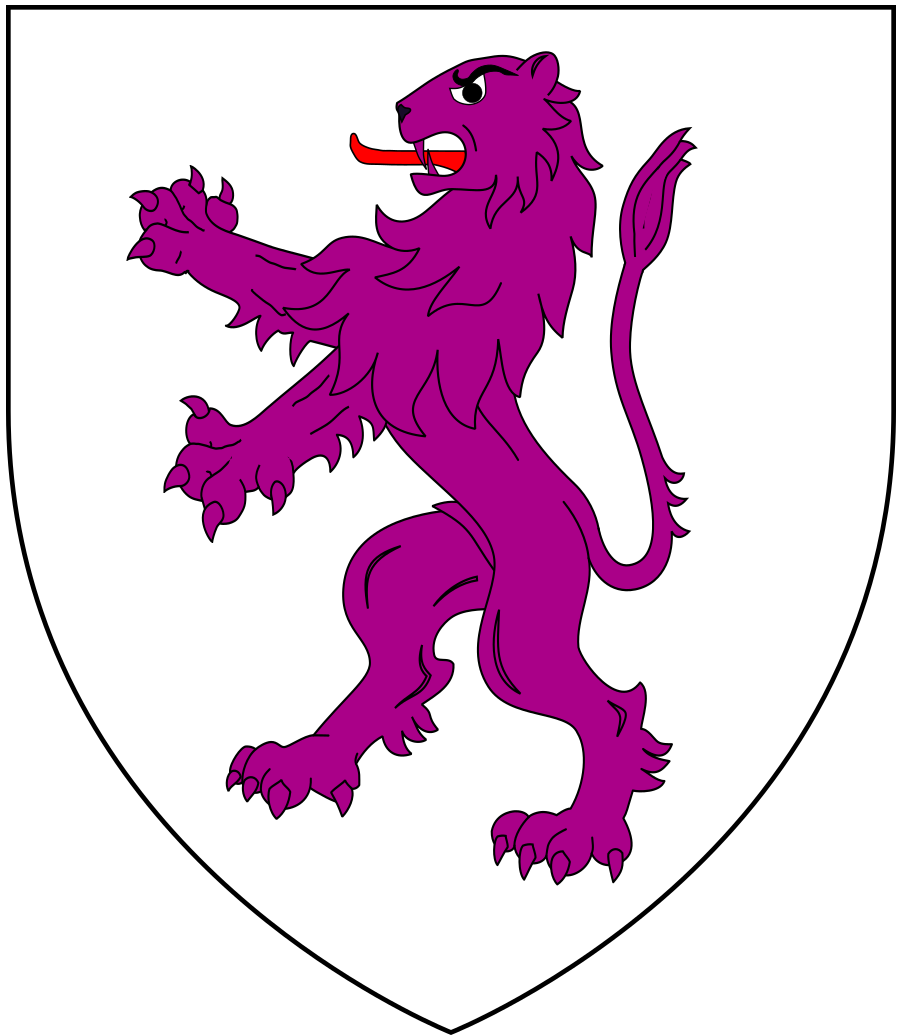
Arms of Dene of Newton St Petrock, Devon.

Arms of British MP Jo Cox, installed in the House of Commons of the United Kingdom

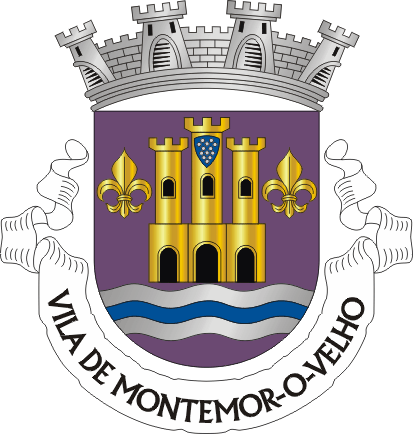
Arms of the Portuguese municipality of Montemor-o-Velho

Arms of Cardinal Luis Ladaria Ferrer

Coat of arms of Kingdom of León

Coat of arms of Castile and León

== See also ==
- Born in the purple ("Porphyrogennetos")
- Tyrian purple
