= Battle of Calais =

Battle of the Hundred Years' War

- Part of the Hundred Years' War
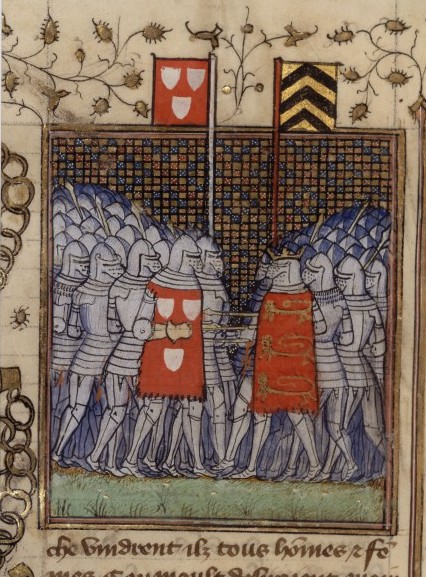
- Geoffrey de Charny (left) and King Edward III of England (right)
Date	1 January 1350
Location	Calais, France 50.9580°N 1.8530°E
Result	English victory

Belligerents
Kingdom of France	Kingdom of England

Commanders and leaders
Geoffrey de Charny (POW)	King Edward III Edward the Black Prince

Strength
5,500	At least 900

Casualties and losses
At least 400	Light

The Battle of Calais took place in 1350 when an English force defeated an unsuspecting French army which was attempting to take the city. Despite a truce being in effect the French commander Geoffrey de Charny had planned to take the city by subterfuge, and bribed Amerigo of Pavia, an Italian officer of the city garrison, to open a gate for them. The English king, Edward III, became aware of the plot and personally led his household knights and the Calais garrison in a surprise counter-attack. The French were routed by this smaller force, with significant losses and all their leaders captured or killed.

Later that day, Edward dined with the highest-ranking captives, treating them with royal courtesy except for Charny, whom he taunted for having abandoned his chivalric principles both by fighting during a truce and by attempting to purchase his way into Calais rather than fight. As Charny was considered a paragon of knightly behaviour, the accusations struck deep, and were frequently repeated in subsequent English propaganda, as Charny was to write several authoritative books on chivalry.

== Background ==
Since the Norman Conquest of 1066, English monarchs had held titles and lands within France, the possession of which made them vassals of the kings of France. Following a series of disagreements between Philip VI of France (r. 1328–1350) and Edward III of England (r. 1327–1377), on 24 May 1337 Philip's Great Council in Paris agreed that the lands held by Edward in France should be taken back into Philip's hands on the grounds that Edward was in breach of his obligations as a vassal. This marked the start of the Hundred Years' War, which was to last 116 years.

After nine years of inconclusive but expensive warfare, Edward landed with an army in northern Normandy in July 1346. He then undertook a large-scale raid through Normandy, including the capture and sack of Caen, to the gates of Paris. After retreating in the face of Philip's large and increasing army, the English turned to fight at the Battle of Crécy, where the French were defeated with heavy loss. Edward needed a defensible port where his army could regroup and be resupplied from the sea. The Channel port of Calais suited this purpose. It was also highly defensible: it boasted a double moat; substantial city walls; and its citadel in the north-west corner had its own moat and additional fortifications. It would provide a secure entrepôt into France for English armies. Calais could be easily resupplied by sea and defended by land.

Edward's army laid siege to the port in September 1346. With French finances and morale at a low ebb after Crécy, Philip failed to relieve the town, and the starving defenders surrendered on 3 August 1347. It was the only large town successfully besieged by either side during the first thirty years of the Hundred Years' War.

Following further inconclusive military manoeuvres by each side for four weeks, and given that both sides were financially exhausted, emissaries despatched by Pope Clement VI found willing listeners. Negotiations began in early September and by the 28th the Truce of Calais, intended to bring a temporary halt to the fighting, had been agreed. This strongly favoured the English, confirming them in possession of all of their territorial conquests. It was to run for nine months to 7 July 1348, but was extended repeatedly over the years until it was formally set aside in 1355. The truce did not stop ongoing naval clashes between the two countries, nor small-scale fighting in Gascony and Brittany.

=== Amerigo of Pavia ===
Calais was vital to England's effort against the French for the rest of the war, it being all but impossible to land a significant force other than at a friendly port. Edward had succeeded in 1346 due to a fortunate combination of circumstances. Earlier, in 1340, Edward's forces had to fight a French fleet larger than his to gain access to the port of Sluys to disembark his army. Possession of Calais also allowed the accumulation of supplies and matériel prior to a campaign. The town had an extremely strong standing garrison of 1,200 men, virtually a small army, under the command of the captain of Calais. He had numerous deputies and specialist under-officers. These included Amerigo of Pavia, (Note: So called by Alfred Burne and Michael Prestwich. He is referred to as Aimeric by Jonathan Sumption; Aymery by Froissart; and Aimery by Kaeuper and Kennedy. There are other variations.) who was employed as Calais's galley master from April 1348. He had command of a tower overlooking Calais's harbour, which contained an entrance into the town's citadel.

Geoffrey de Charny was a senior and well-respected Burgundian knight in French service. In 1346, freshly returned from a crusade in the east, he assisted the King's son during a campaign in south-west France. (Note: The future King John II (r. 1350–1364).) In 1347, when the French army had approached Calais to relieve it, the English were found to be so strongly entrenched that to attack them was hopeless; Charny was one of the senior knights sent by Philip to formally challenge Edward to bring his army out and fight in the open field. Confounded, the French marched away in humiliation and the next day Calais surrendered. In July 1348, as a member of the King's Council, Charny was put in charge of all French forces in the north east. The truce at an end, his forces harassed the English to little effect. Both monarchs were exasperated at the fruitless expense of the war and the truce was renewed.

Amerigo had served the French and Charny arranged for him to be approached with a view to betraying Calais in exchange for a bribe. The truce facilitated contact and Charny reasoned that, as a man of low status, Amerigo would be more susceptible to avarice and as a non-Englishman, he would have fewer scruples regarding treachery. In mid-1349 Charny came to an agreement with him to open the gate under his control, so as to deliver up Calais, in exchange for 20,000 écus (approximately £4,700,000 in 2025 terms (Note: UK Retail Price Index inflation figures are based on data from Clark, Gregory (2017). "The Annual RPI and Average Earnings for Britain, 1209 to Present (New Series)". MeasuringWorth. Retrieved 28 October 2018. To give a very rough idea of earning power, an English foot-soldier could expect to earn £1 in wages for, usually seasonal, military service in approximately three months.)) and they met to personally seal the agreement. Contemporary English and French chroniclers, who usually exalt Charny, sarcastically report this as him having "gone shopping" (marchander) for Calais.

According to most accounts, Edward heard of the plot from others and agreed to spare Amerigo the punishment for treason (being hanged almost to the point of death, emasculated, disembowelled, beheaded and chopped into four pieces) on condition that he go along with Edward's counter-plan. One of the three versions of his 14th-century Chronicles published by Jean Froissart states that Amerigo voluntarily betrayed Charny. There is agreement that Edward first heard of the plot on or a little before 24 December, and the contemporary sources agree that he interviewed Amerigo at Havering near London on 24 December. Edward responded rapidly, gathering 900 men – 300 men-at-arms and 600 archers – and sailed for Calais with Amerigo. To maintain secrecy the expedition was carried out under the titular command of Sir Walter Manny, previously the first captain of Calais. Amerigo's brother was held in England to ensure Amerigo's cooperation.

=== French preparations ===
By that point, Charny had gathered a force of some 5,500 men at Saint-Omer, 25 miles (40 km) from Calais. This consisted of 1,500 men-at-arms, including most of the senior military figures of north-east France, and 4,000 infantry. They would be opposed by the 1,200-strong garrison of Calais, plus several hundred other English inhabitants who could be called to arms in an emergency. Charny needed a large force to avoid being repulsed by the strong garrison once he entered the town. The gate controlled by Amerigo was too difficult of approach to be used by such a large force, although it provided easy access to the harbour for ship's crews. Worse, the gate could be reached only on foot at low tide along a narrow beach, up against the town walls. Even to get as far as Amerigo's gate would be difficult; Calais was surrounded by a broad belt of marshes, and the few roads through them were controlled by English blockhouses.

The French came up with a plan to set off on New Year's Eve, when the hours of darkness would be close to their maximum, low tide would be shortly before dawn, and the English sentries and garrisons might be caught celebrating or sleeping. The blockhouses would be bypassed and Calais reached before dawn. The bulk of the French would wait not far from the town, while a force of 112 men-at-arms entered through Amerigo's gate at night. Some would secure the citadel, while others made their way through the sleeping town to the Boulogne Gate, one of the main gates. The gatehouse would be seized, the gate opened and the majority of Charny's force, led by the mounted men-at-arms, would enter and bring overwhelming force to bear on the garrison by surprise.

The leader of the group to enter through Amerigo's gate was Oudart de Renti, a French knight who had been banished, joined the English and been given a command in the army of 20,000 Flemings who supported Edward's siege of Calais. In 1347 he was pardoned by Philip, turned his coat again and was appointed by Charny because of his detailed knowledge of the area around Calais, and to give him an opportunity to redeem his honour.

== Battle ==
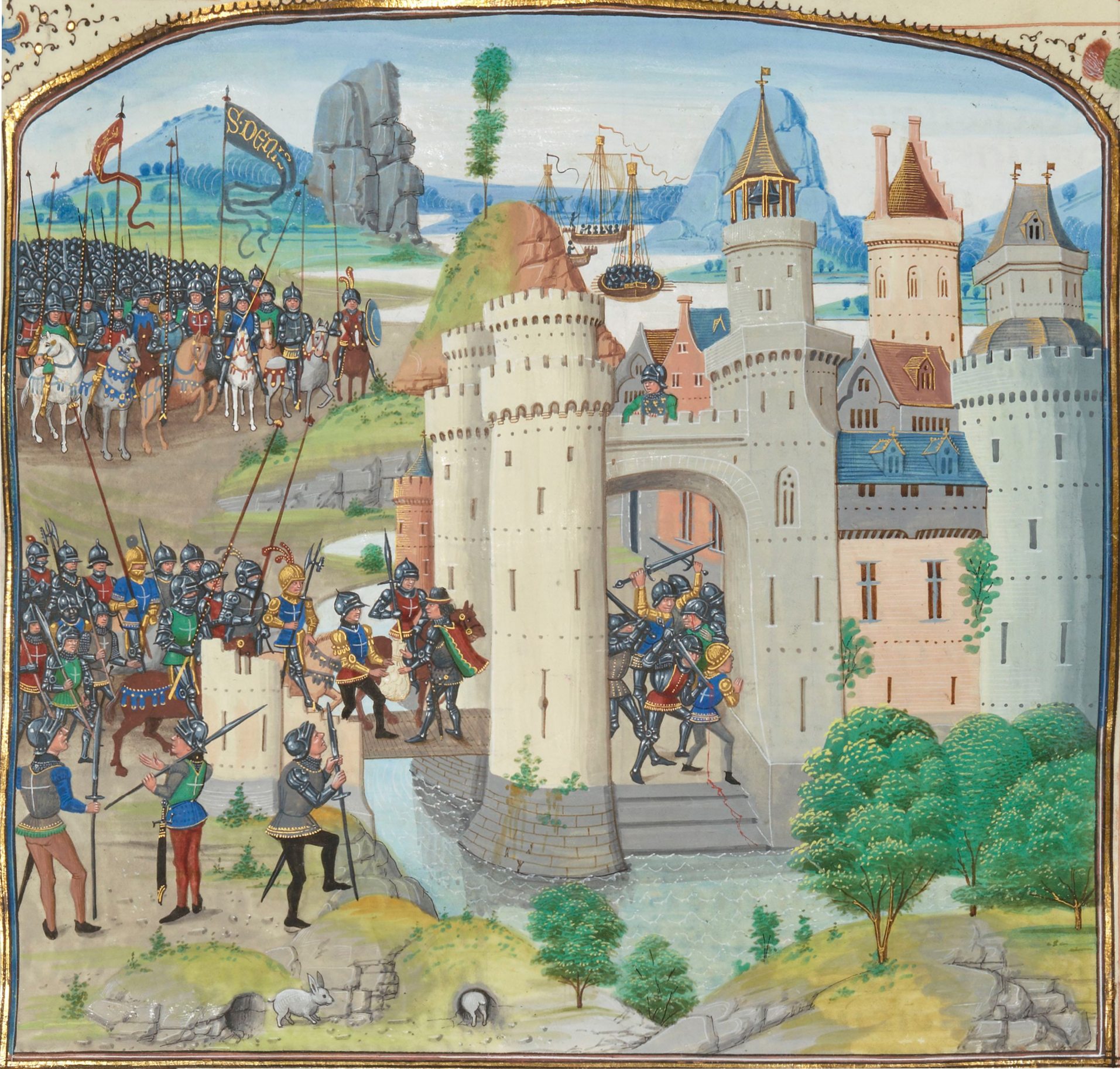
The battle of Calais, from Froissart's Chronicles

Charny's force marched for Calais on the evening of 31 December 1349. (Note: Kaeuper and Kennedy (1996) review the sources for the date of the attack; some give 30 December 1349.) The blockhouses were circumvented and the French assembled close to Calais. A little before dawn the advance party approached Amerigo's gate-tower. The gate was open, and Amerigo emerged to greet them. He exchanged his son for the first installment of his bribe and led a small group of French knights into the gatehouse. (Note: Some sources state that Amerigo's son had already been surrendered to Charny.) Shortly a French standard was unfurled atop the tower of the gatehouse and more French crossed the drawbridge over the moat. Suddenly the drawbridge was raised, a portcullis fell in front of the French and sixty English men-at-arms surrounded them. All of the French who had entered the gatehouse were captured. (Note: Chroniclers of the time give conflicting accounts of the details. Kaeuper and Kennedy (1996) provide a summary.)

At the sound of a trumpet the Boulogne Gate was opened and Edward, in plain armour and under Walter Manny's banner, led out his household troops, supported by a detachment of archers, and attacked the French. With a cry of "Betrayed!" a large part of Charny's force fled. Charny hastily organized his remaining troops and held off the initial English attack, and Edward was given a hard fight. Edward's eldest son, the Black Prince, led his own household knights out of the north gate, the Water Gate, and along the beach, past the citadel, and into a position on the French force's exposed left flank. As Edward and Charny's forces fought, members of the Calais garrison, who had not been privy to the plan, were hastily arming themselves and steadily reinforcing Edward's hard-pressed group. How many of the garrison joined Edward and the Black Prince's 900 men before the fighting ended is not known.

Charney's force still outnumbered the English, but broke when the Black Prince's force attacked. More than 200 men-at-arms were killed in the fighting. Thirty French knights were taken prisoner. As was common, none of the contemporary sources record the number of casualties among the socially inferior French infantry. (Note: For example, none of the fifteen contemporary and near-contemporary sources cited by Harari give any information regarding non-knightly casualties.) In the battles of the time, non-knightly captives were usually killed on the spot, partly from aristocratic contempt for the non-knightly, and partly from a disinclination to care for prisoners who could not be ransomed. An unknown number of fugitives drowned as they fled through the marshes. Total French casualties are not certain; "several hundred" according to the historian Yuval Harari. As no Englishman of note was killed, English casualties are not recorded. The King and his son had been in the fore of the fighting. Among the English nobility involved were the Earl of Suffolk, Lord Stafford, Lord Montagu, Lord Beauchamp, Lord Berkeley, and Lord de la Warr. Among the French captured were Charny, with a serious head wound, Eustace de Ribemont and Oudart de Renti – three of the leading French commanders in Picardy; Pépin de Wierre was killed.

== Aftermath ==
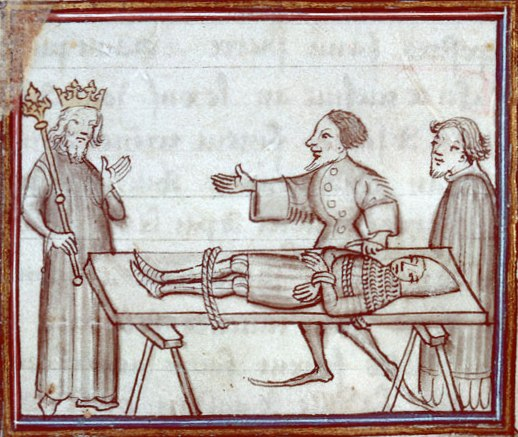
Geoffrey de Charny, wounded and a prisoner of Edward III, after his attempt to take control of Calais (miniature from a manuscript of Fleurs des chroniques, late 14th century)

Knightly prisoners were considered the personal property of their captors, who would ransom them for large sums. As he had fought in the front rank, Edward claimed many of the prisoners as his own, including Charny, whose captor he rewarded with a gratuity of 100 marks (Note: A medieval English mark was an accounting unit equivalent to two-thirds of a pound sterling.) (approximately £80,000 in 2025 terms). That evening Edward, who was always conscious of the image he presented, invited the higher-ranking of the captives to dine with him, revealing that he had fought them incognito. He made pleasant conversation with all but Charny, whom he taunted with having abandoned his chivalric principles both by fighting during a truce and by attempting to purchase his way into Calais rather than fight. The detailed defences of Charny's actions later published suggest that the charges had merit by the standards of the time.

Charny was considered a paragon of knightly honour, was acknowledged by contemporaries as a "true and perfect Knight", and was the author of several books on chivalry. He was also the keeper of the Oriflamme, the French royal battle banner; the requirements of this office included being "a knight noble in intention and deed ... virtuous ... and chivalrous". The accusations struck deep and were astute blows in the active propaganda war between the two countries. The modern historian Jonathan Sumption reports that the whole affair was so embarrassing that French participants were said to have "maintained a tight-lipped silence" regarding their roles in it. Whether Charny had acted in an unknightly manner in attempting to purchase his way into Calais was still being debated in the 19th century.

Ribeaumont was promptly released on parole, so Philip should have a first-hand account of the débâcle. Ribeaumont later voluntarily travelled to England to surrender himself until his ransom was paid. Most of the prisoners were paroled on a promise not to fight until they had redeemed themselves. Charny had to wait eighteen months until his ransom was paid in full, for his release. The amount is not known, but King John II (r. 1350–1364), Philip's son and successor after his father's death during Charny's imprisonment, made a partial contribution of 12,000 écus (approximately £2,000,000 in 2025 terms). During his captivity Charny wrote much of his famous Book of Chivalry (Livre de chevalerie), in which he warns against turning to "cunning schemes" as opposed to actions which are "true, loyal and sensible".

Amerigo was allowed to keep the instalment of his bribe he had received from Renti. He soon returned to Italy and went on a pilgrimage to Rome. The fate of his hostaged son, who was carried off into French captivity in the nearby town of Guînes, is not known.

=== Charny's revenge ===
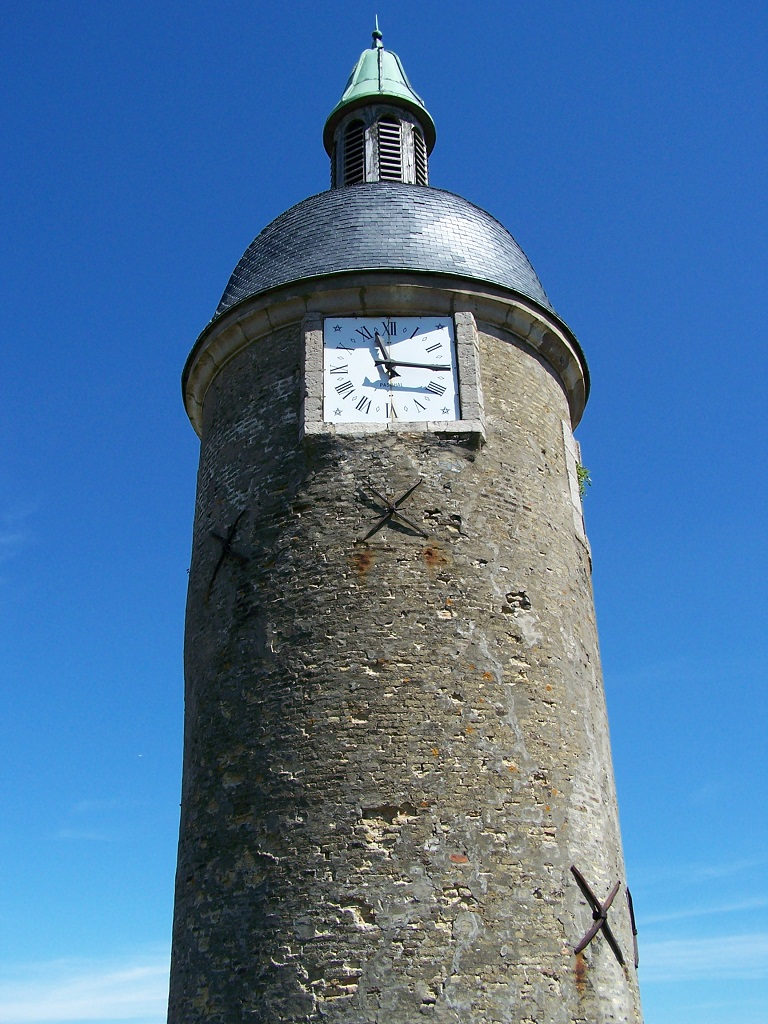
The keep at Guînes in 2007

In late 1350 Raoul, Count of Eu, the Grand Constable of France, returned after more than four years in English captivity. He was on parole from Edward personally, pending the handover of his ransom. This had been set at an exorbitant 80,000 écus, too high for Raoul to afford. It had been agreed that he would instead hand over the town of Guînes, which was in his possession. This was a common method of settling ransoms. Guînes had an extremely strong keep, and was the leading fortification in the French defensive ring around Calais. English possession would go a long way to securing Calais against more surprise assaults. Guînes was of little financial value to Raoul, and it was clear that Edward was prepared to accept it only in lieu of a full ransom payment because of its strategic position.

Angered by the attempt to weaken the blockade of Calais, the new French king, John II, promptly had Raoul executed for treason. The perceived interference of the crown in a nobleman's personal affairs, especially one of such high status, caused an uproar in France. Charny had served under Raoul during his first military campaigns and was related by marriage, but his views on the situation are not known. The English made much of this in their diplomatic and propaganda campaigns.

In early January 1352 a band of freelancing English soldiers seized Guînes by a midnight escalade. The French were furious, the acting-commander was drawn and quartered for dereliction of duty at Charny's behest, and a strong protest was sent to Edward. He was thereby put in a difficult position because of the flagrant breach of the truce. Retaining Guînes would mean a loss of honour and a resumption of open warfare, for which he was unprepared. He ordered the English occupants to hand it back.

The English parliament was scheduled to assemble the following week. Several members of the King's Council made fiery, warmongering speeches and the parliament was persuaded to approve three years of war taxes. Reassured that he had adequate financial backing, Edward changed his mind. By the end of January the Captain of Calais had fresh orders: to take over the garrisoning of Guînes in the King's name; and thus the war resumed.

The English had been strengthening the defences of Calais with the construction of fortified towers or bastions at bottlenecks on the roads through the marshes to the town. With the war resumed Amerigo had returned to English service. It was felt that his service at Calais had earned him a position of responsibility, but he was not trusted enough to be assigned to any place where a betrayal would be a devastating blow. He was placed in charge of a new tower at Fretun, 3 miles (4.8 km) south west of Calais.

The main French effort of this round of fighting was against Guînes. Geoffrey de Charny was again put in charge of all French forces in the north east. He assembled an army of 4,500 men, against the English garrison of 115. He reoccupied the town, but in spite of fighting described as savage, he failed to take the keep. In July the Calais garrison launched a surprise night attack on Charny's army, killing many Frenchmen and destroying their siege works.

Shortly after, Charny abandoned the siege and marched his army to Fretun where it launched a surprise attack during the night of 24/25 July. Assailed by an entire French army, the night watch fled. According to one near-contemporary account by Jean Froissart, Amerigo was found still in bed, with his English mistress. Charny took him to Saint-Omer, where he disbanded his troops. Before they departed they gathered, together with the populace from miles around, to witness Amerigo being tortured to death with hot irons and quartered with an axe; his remains were displayed above the town gates. Charny neither garrisoned nor slighted Fretun, to reinforce his view that his argument was a personal one with Amerigo, which entitled Charny to attack the tower to capture him; and that he had acted with honour in leaving it to be reoccupied by the English.

Charny was killed in 1356 at the Battle of Poitiers, when the French royal army was defeated by a smaller Anglo-Gascon force commanded by the Black Prince, and John was captured. Charny fell holding the Oriflamme, thereby fulfilling his keeper's oath to die before giving up the banner. Calais remained in English hands until 1558.

== Notes, citations and sources ==
=== Sources ===
- Burne, Alfred (1999) [1955]. The Crecy War. Ware, Hertfordshire: Wordsworth Editions. ISBN 978-1840222104.
- Contamine, Philippe (1973). "L'Oriflamme de Saint Denis" [The Oriflamme Saint Denis]. Annales (in French). 31 (6): 1170–1171. OCLC 179713536.
- DeVries, Kelly (1998) [1996]. Infantry Warfare in the Early Fourteenth Century: Discipline, Tactics, and Technology. Woodbridge, Suffolk; Rochester, New York: Boydell Press. ISBN 978-0851155715.
- Froissart, John (1844). The Chronicles of England, France and Spain. London: William Smith. OCLC 91958290.
- Gribit, Nicholas (2016). Henry of Lancaster's Expedition to Aquitaine 1345–46. Woodbridge, Suffolk: Boydell Press. ISBN 978-1783271177.
- Harari, Yuval N. (2007). "For a Sack-full of Gold Écus: Calais 1350". Special Operations in the Age of Chivalry, 1100–1550. Woodbridge, Suffolk: Boydell Press. pp. 109–124. ISBN 978-1-84383-292-8.
- Harding, V. (2002). The Dead and the Living in Paris and London, 1500–1670. Cambridge: Cambridge University Press. ISBN 978-0521811262.
- Jaques, Tony (2007). Dictionary of Battles and Sieges. Westport, Connecticut: Greenwood Publishing Group. ISBN 978-0313335372.
- Kaeuper, Richard (2013). "Introduction". In Charny, Geoffroi de (ed.). A Knight's Own Book of Chivalry. Philadelphia: University of Pennsylvania Press. pp. 1–45. ISBN 978-0812208689.
- Kaeuper, Richard W. & Kennedy, Elspeth (1996). The Book of Chivalry of Geoffroi de Charny: Text, Context, and Translation. Philadelphia: University of Pennsylvania Press. ISBN 978-0812233483.
- King, Andy (2002). "According to the Custom Used in French and Scottish Wars: Prisoners and Casualties on the Scottish Marches in the Fourteenth Century". Journal of Medieval History. 28 (3): 263–290. doi:10.1016/S0048-721X(02)00057-X. ISSN 0304-4181. S2CID 159873083.
- King, Andy (2017). "'Then a Great Misfortune Befell Them': the Laws of War on Surrender and the Killing of Prisoners on the Battlefield in the Hundred Years' War". Journal of Medieval History. 43 (1): 106–117. doi:10.1080/03044181.2016.1236502. S2CID 159619516.
- Oman, Charles (1998) [1924]. A History of the Art of War in the Middle Ages: 1278–1485 A.D. London: Greenhill Books. ISBN 978-1853673320.
- Ormrod, W. Mark (1990). Edward III. New Haven, Connecticut: Yale University Press. ISBN 978-0300055061.
- Prestwich, M. (2005). J.M. Roberts (ed.). Plantagenet England 1225–1360. Oxford: Clarendon Press (published 15 September 2005). ISBN 978-0-19-822844-8.
- Sumption, Jonathan (1990). Trial by Battle. The Hundred Years' War. Vol. I. London: Faber and Faber. ISBN 978-0571200955.
- Sumption, Jonathon (1999). Trial by Fire. The Hundred Years' War. Vol. II. London: Faber and Faber. ISBN 978-0571138968.
- Tuchman, Barbara W. (1978). A Distant Mirror, the Calamitous 14th Century. New York: Alfred A. Knopf. ISBN 978-0307291608.
- Wagner, John A. (2006a). "Armies, Command of". Encyclopedia of the Hundred Years War. Woodbridge, Suffolk: Greenwood. pp. 19–21. ISBN 978-0313327360.
- Wagner, John A. (2006b). "Calais, Truce of (1347)". Encyclopedia of the Hundred Years War. Woodbridge, Suffolk: Greenwood. pp. 74–75. ISBN 978-0313327360.
- Wagner, John A. (2006c). "Crécy, Battle of (1346)". Encyclopedia of the Hundred Years War. Woodbridge, Suffolk: Greenwood. pp. 105–107. ISBN 978-0313327360.
- Wagner, John A. (2006d). "Hundred Years' War, Causes of". Encyclopedia of the Hundred Years War. Woodbridge, Suffolk: Greenwood. pp. 157–159. ISBN 978-0313327360.
- Wagner, John A. (2006e). "Hundred Years' War, Phases of". Encyclopedia of the Hundred Years War. Woodbridge, Suffolk: Greenwood. pp. 160–164. ISBN 978-0313327360.
- Wagner, John A. (2006f). "John II, King of France (1319–1364)". Encyclopedia of the Hundred Years War. Woodbridge, Suffolk: Greenwood. pp. 179–181. ISBN 978-0313327360.
- Wagner, John A. (2006g). "Philip VI, King of France (1293–1350)". Encyclopedia of the Hundred Years War. Woodbridge, Suffolk: Greenwood. pp. 250–252. ISBN 978-0313327360.
- Whetham, David (2009). Just Wars and Moral Victories: Surprise, Deception and the Normative Framework of European War in the Later Middle Ages. History of Warfare. Vol. 55. Leiden: Brill. ISBN 978-9004171534.
