= Oudart I de Renti =

14th-century French nobleman

- Born: c. 1310; Artois, France
- Died: c. 1370; France

Sir Oudart I de Renti (Note: Also Odard or Odart de Renty.) (died c. 1370), Lord of Embry, Curlu, Affringues, and Vaudringhem was a French nobleman.

== Biography ==
Oudart was a child of Baudouin I de Renty, Lord of Renty and Gertrude de Flavy, Dame of Aix-en-Boulonnais. He was banished from France, having been a follower of Robert de Artois and afterwards was actively involved with the English and Flemish. After being defeated, leading a Flemish army in 1347, he was pardoned by King Philip VI of France switching allegiance back to the French.

Renti joined with other French nobles in an attempt in 1349 to recapture Calais by bribing Amerigo of Pavia, an Italian officer of the city garrison, to open a gate for them. Oudart lead the force which entered Amerigo's gate. Having entered the gatehouse, the drawbridge was suddenly raised, a portcullis fell in front of the French and sixty English men-at-arms surrounded them. Amerigo had betrayed the French to King Edward III of England. Oudart and all of the French who had entered the gatehouse were captured. The ensuing battle outside the gates of Calais, resulted in the deaths of many of the French and a number were also captured, including the French commander Geoffrey de Charny.

Oudart was appointed the governor of Tournai in 1364 and also pledged his support behind Bertrand du Guesclin, Constable of France who called for the expulsion of the English from France in 1370.

== Marriage and issue ==
He married Jeanne Catherine, daughter of François, Lord of Azincourt and Clotilde de Cavron, Dame de La Loge, they are known to have had the following issue.

- Oudart II de Renti (died 25 October 1415), married Jeanne de Bournonville, had issue.
- Marie-Isabeau de Renti (died 1377), married Hugues de Ricametz, had issue.
- Jean de Renti (died 25 October 1415).
