= Château de Calais =

Château de Calais was a 13th century castle constructed to defend the port of Calais, France. It was razed to the ground in 1558, after being recaptured from the English by the French and a citadel built on its ruins.

== History ==
The castle was built in 1229, by Philip I, Count of Boulogne, to the north west of the port, consisting of a square courtyard, surrounded by six towers with a donjon.

King Edward III of England captured the town and castle after a siege in 1347. The English foiled by ambushing an unsuspecting French force which was attempting to take the city by stealth in 1349. The French commander, Geoffrey de Charny, had attempted to bribe Amerigo of Pavia, an officer of the garrison, to open a tower gate for them.

Thomas of Woodstock, 1st Duke of Gloucester, uncle of Richard II of England was imprisoned in Calais in 1397 and was assassinated.

Philip the Good, Duke of Burgundy laid siege to Calais between June and July 1436 with a force of Flemish militia, that was unsuccessful.

After recovering the region of Calais from the English in 1558, led by Francis, Duke of Guise, the French razed the castle. King François II ordered the construction of a citadel on the site of the castle ruins, with construction commencing in 1564.
