= Eustace de Ribemont =

14th-century French nobleman

- Arms of Eustace: De gueules fretté d'or, au canton d'or chargé d'un léopard de sable (Gules, fretty of six or, on a canton or, a leopard sable).
- Died: 19 September 1356; Poitiers, France

Sir Eustace de Ribemont (died 19 September 1356) was a French nobleman, who was the French standard-bearer in 1346.

== Biography ==
Eustace was lord of Ribemont in Tierasche, Picardy. He fought in the Hundred Years' War, where he fought during the battle of Calais in 1350. The French knight Geoffroi de Charny, bribed Amerigo de Pavia of the Calais garrison to open a gate for the French forces. Ribemont was engaged in combat by King Edward III of England, who fought incognito, whom Ribemont knocked down a couple of times during the fight and was later captured. He was later released without ransom for his bravery.

He was the French standard-bearer at the battle of Poitiers on 19 September 1356, where he was killed.
