= Braine (surname) =

Braine is a surname. Notable people with the surname include:

- Bernard Braine (1914–2000), British politician
- Daniel L. Braine (1829–1898), American naval admiral
- David Braine (philosopher) (born 1940), British philosopher
- David Braine (athletic director) (born 1943), athletic director
- Jehan de Braine (c. 1200–1240), Count of Macon and Vienne
- John Braine (1922–1986), English novelist
- Martin Braine (1926–1996), British, American psychologist
- Pierre Braine (1900–1951), Belgian footballer
- Raymond Braine (1907–1978), Belgian footballer
- Richard Braine (actor) (born 1956), British actor
- Richard Braine (politician) (born 1968), British politician, leader of the UK Independence Party (UKIP)
- Robert Braine (1896–1940), American composer
