= Braine =

Braine may refer to:

== People ==
- Braine (surname)

== Places ==
- Braine, Aisne, a commune in the department of Aisne, France
- Braine-l'Alleud, a municipality in the province of Walloon Brabant, Belgium
- Braine-le-Château, a municipality in the province of Walloon Brabant, Belgium
- Braine-le-Comte, a municipality in the province of Hainaut, Belgium
- Canton of Braine, administrative region of France
- Braine Castle, Castle in Belgium

== Other uses ==
- USS Braine (DD-630), an American naval ship
