= Pépin de Wierre =

14th-century French nobleman

- Coat of arms: Argent, a saltire gules, charged with four bezants or, between four lions sable, armed and langued gules.
- Successor: Robert (son)
- Died: 1350; Calais, France
- Occupation: French Nobleman

Sir Pépin de Wierre (Note: Also Pépin de Biere, or Were, Wiere and Werie).) (died 1350), Lord of Maison-Ponthieu, was a French nobleman.

== Biography ==
Wierre joined with other French nobles in an attempt in 1349 to recapture Calais by bribing Amerigo of Pavia, an Italian officer of the city garrison, to open a gate for them. Having entered the gatehouse, the drawbridge was suddenly raised, a portcullis fell in front of the French and sixty English men-at-arms surrounded them. Amerigo had betrayed the French to King Edward III of England. The ensuing battle outside the gates of Calais, resulted in the deaths of Wierre and many of the French and a number were also captured, including the French commander Geoffrey de Charny.

He was succeeded by his son Robert.
