= Citadel of Calais =

16th-century citadel in Calais, France

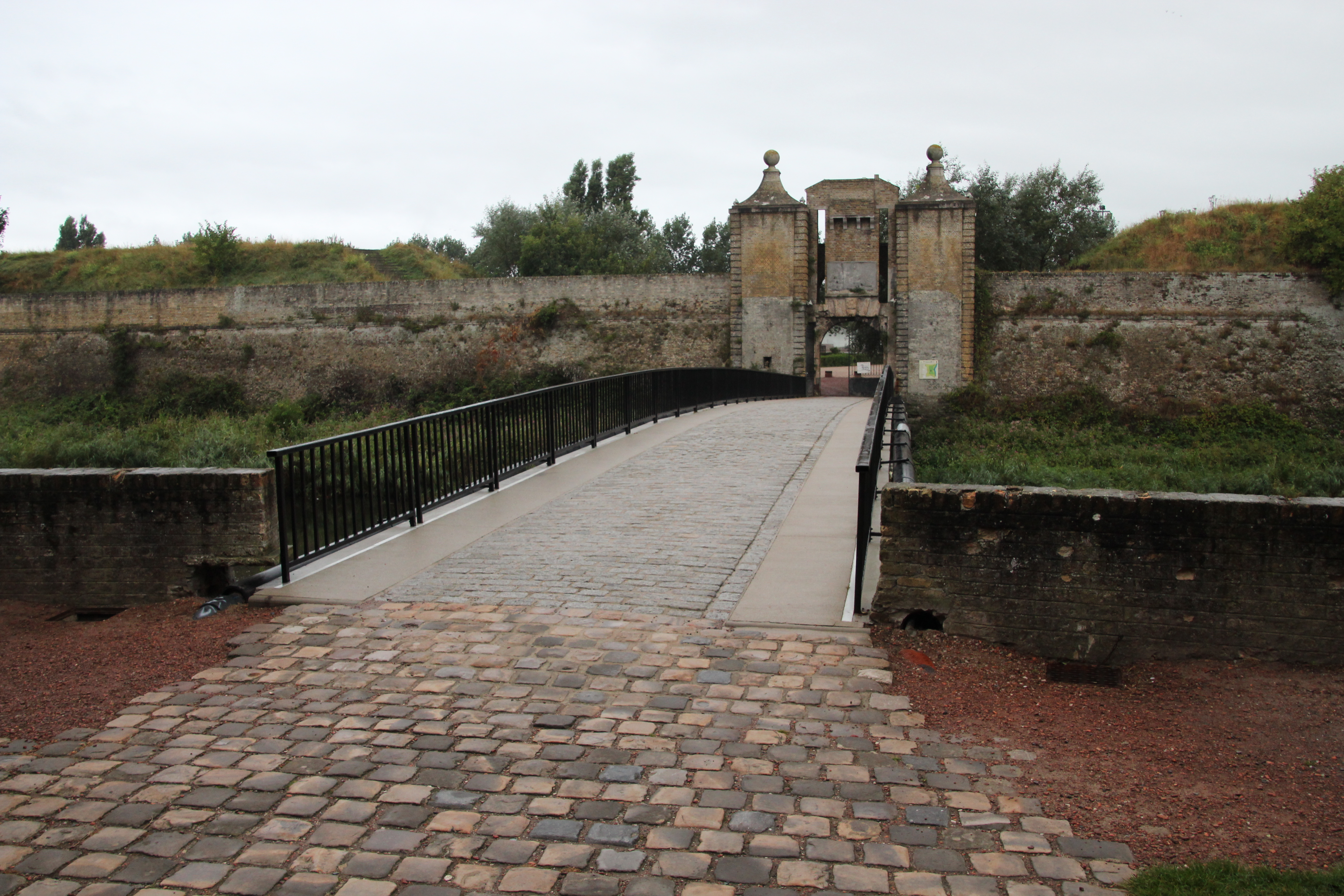
- La Porte de Neptune, which provides access from the east into the Citadel of Calais
- Interactive map of Citadel of Calais
- Location: Calais, Pas-de-Calais, Hauts-de-France
- Coordinates: 50°57′25″N 1°50′31″E

The Citadel of Calais is a fortress that was initially constructed in the 16th century on the ruins of a medieval castle dating from the 13th century and whose purpose was to defend the city of Calais.

== Origins ==
At the end of 1558, upon recovering the region of Calais from England with the aid of Francis, Duke of Guise, it became a priority for all the succeeding kings of France to ensure that Calais would forever remain a part of the Kingdom of France. This priority was also influenced by the city's geographical location and, especially, its proximity to the Spanish Netherlands and England.

To that end, the ancient medieval castle constructed in 1229 which defended Calais, (and which also served as the site of the assassination of the uncle of Richard II, the Duke of Gloucester), and which formed a square fort of six towers with a donjon located northwest of the city, was razed to build on its ruins a new citadel, better suited to the necessities of war during time period.

It was King François II who decided to build the new citadel on the site of the ancient castle. In order to do this, an entire neighborhood was razed. Among the destroyed buildings included hotels, where during English control English lords once stayed, and the church of St. Nicholas. Only the Escalles Hotel, which served as the lodgings for the new commander of the citadel, was spared.

The first stone was laid in 1564, the same year when England recognised Calais as French territory after the French gave Queen Elizabeth I 120,000 crowns as barter. The Italian Giacomo Castriotto and Jean Errard of Bar-le-Duc were two engineers who participated in the work. Errard, who also designed the citadels of Amiens and Doullens, was the creator of the half moon of the Hermitage at the gate of the citadel which is now known as Neptune's Gate. The castle consisted of four towers. A medieval part of the city wall which connected the Carrée Tower and the Pavée Tower still exists today. You can also enter the citadel after passing through the half-moon entrance of the Porte de Secours - Rescue Door, then through the Porte de Boulogne .

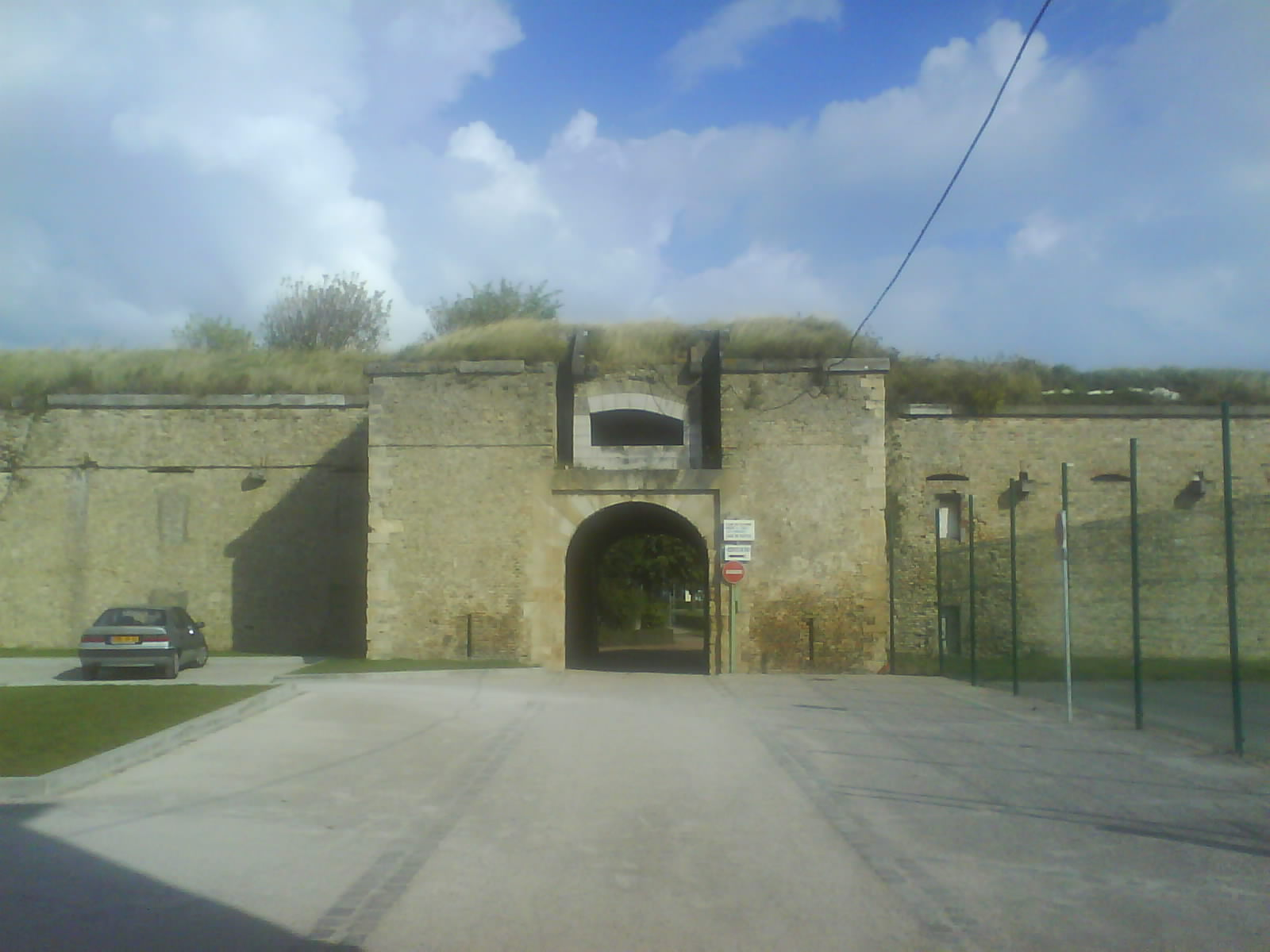
The Porte de Boulogne, which provides access from the south into the Citadel of Calais

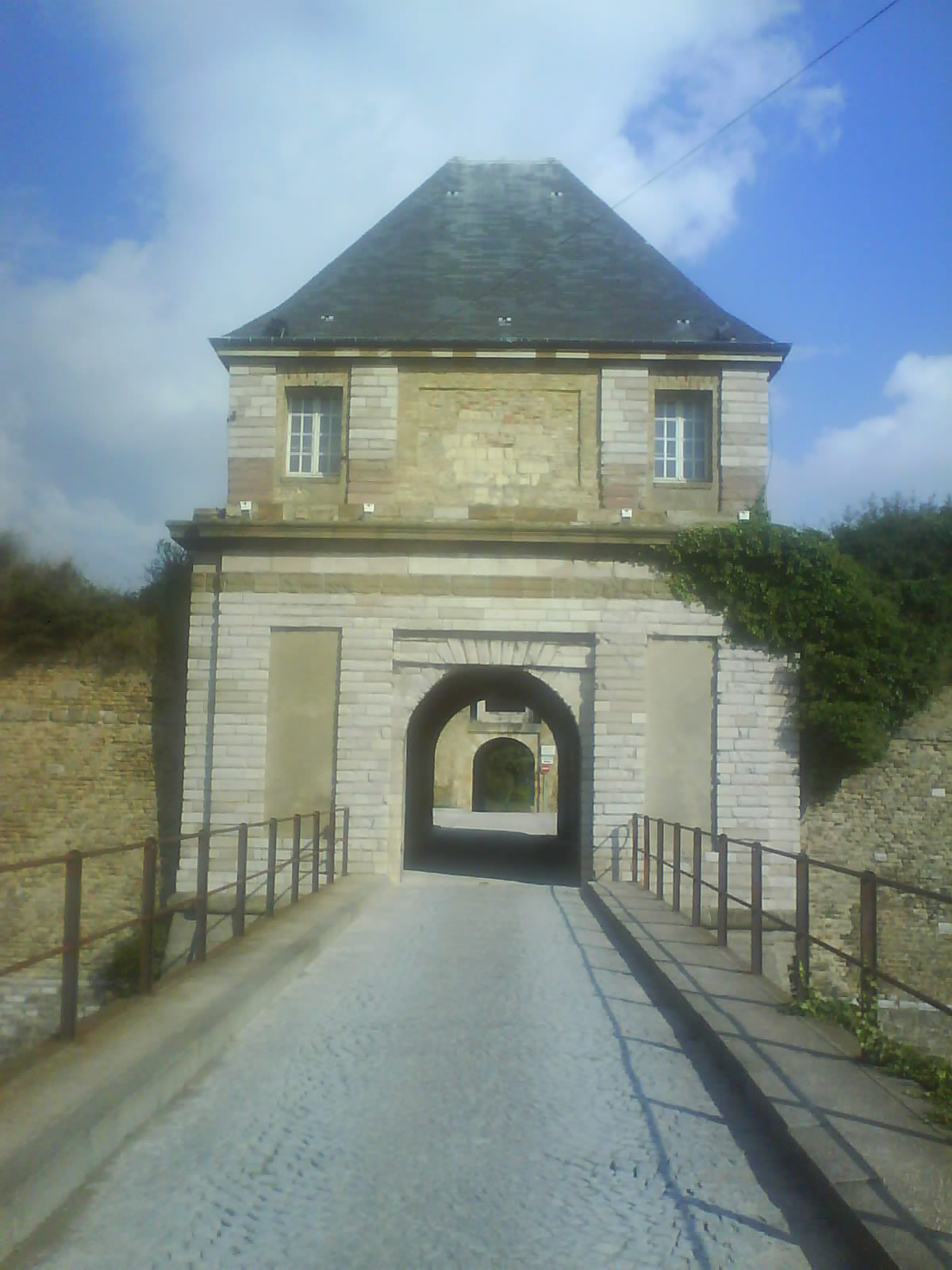
The Porte de Secours, and the Porte de Boulogne visible within its arch.

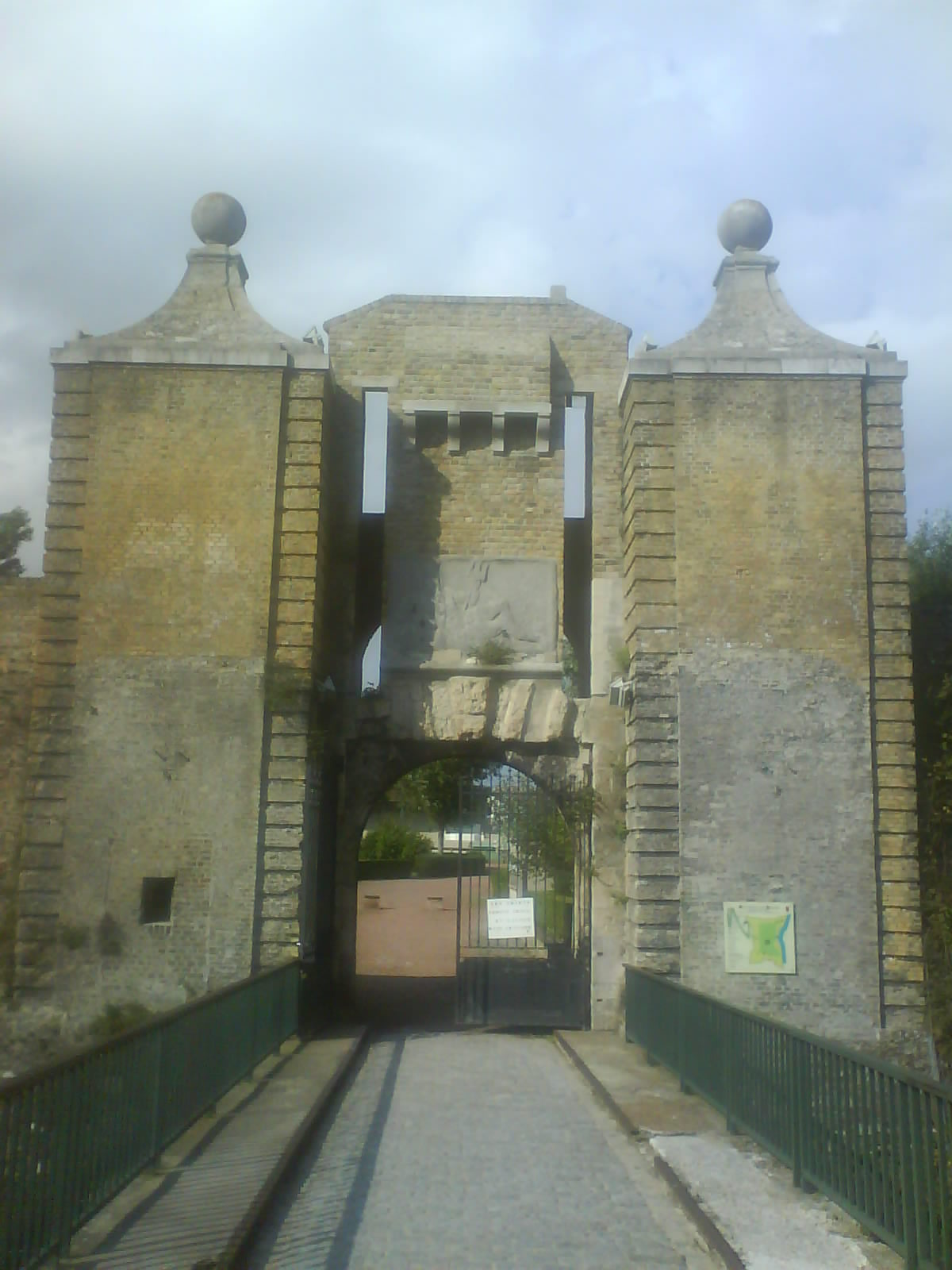
The Porte de Neptune, which provides access from the east into the Citadel of Calais

== Baptism by fire ==
Thirty years after the commencement of building, a conflict between France and Spain placed the citadel into the heart of conflict. On April 24, 1596, after Fort Risban and Fort Nieulay had already fallen, the inhabitants of Calais found refuge at the Citadel of Calais in order to flee from the troops of the Albert VII, Archduke of Austria, Governor of the Flanders. However, the hollow wall, because it was filled with sand, fell under the fire of cannons. The northeastern stronghold, assaulted by the enemy, fell in turn despite the fierce resistance led by Michel Patras de Campaigno, nicknamed "the black knight". On April 25, 1596, the Kingdom of France lost Calais.

History accounts for a real massacre and pillage of the city by the Spaniards who were looking for gold and silver. The city remained under Spanish control until May 1598, the date of the Treaty of Vervins, which returned Calais to the crown of France.

== Residence of governors ==
Restored to France, Calais and its citadel served as the official residence of the governors of Calais until 1636. Above all, these governors were the object of attentive care on the part of the monarchs of France because of Calais' geographically privileged location.

In 1605, in memory of the church that was destroyed for construction of the citadel, the name of St. Nicholas was given to a small church that was built inside the ramparts. Many marriages, deaths and baptisms were celebrated there until the French Revolution, when the church was converted into a food store. The fortifications were increased under Henri IV.

== Richelieu ==
In May 1632, upon hearing information about a plot to sell Calais to England, Louis XIII and Cardinal Richelieu visited Calais and planned to make the entire city a gigantic fortress with a large military port. Richelieu's works were smaller than planned: a large arsenal containing a large courtyard surrounded by several buildings to store arms and wheat, three underground housing complexes for soldiers in case of bombing, wheat mills and bread ovens. A column, which incorporates the bust of Richelieu, was also erected in the courtyard. The work was carried out by the Marquis de Saint-Chamond, Melchior Mitte de Chevrieres who constantly asked for funds for the work, while the finances of the state were spent on the troops at war against Lorraine.

== Vauban ==
In 1658, the reconquest by Louis XIV of Gravelines and Dunkirk reduced the strategic importance of the city of Calais. Nevertheless, during his stays in Calais, Louis XIV confided to Vauban his interest in the rehabilitation of the fortifications of the city, namely the citadel, Fort Risban and the reconstruction of Fort Nieulay, one of the very rare forts-écluses in France. The King returned a few years later, to see the completed work by his famous military engineer.

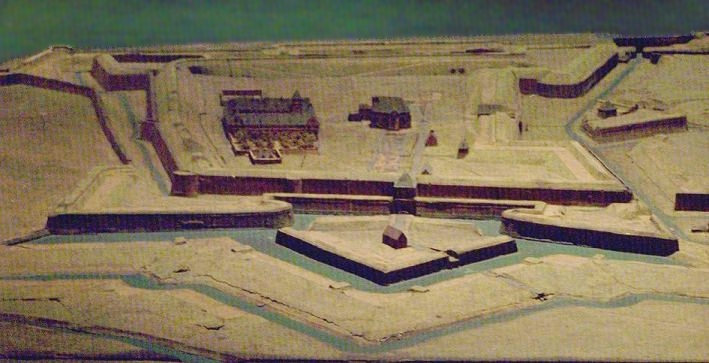
The Citadel of Calais, southern view on a relief map of the city, 17th century

A Royal French Navy officer, Claude de Forbin was imprisoned for three weeks in 1691 for shooting at a Mr. Fervaquet, who owed Forbin 500 books and who insulted Forbin in the street.

== 18th century ==
During the French Revolution, some wanted to raze the citadel, claiming that it could serve as a base of support for counter revolutionaries.

Before being transferred to the Tour du Guet, the citadel is where Claude Chappe performed the first tests of his semaphore telegraph.

== 19th century ==
In the 19th century, the citadel had a barracks with a capacity of 1,000 troops, two tanks, many underground bunkers, powder magazines, grocery stores and stables. The southern rampart, built in the Middle Ages, was doubled to include stables and, in wartime, to house troops. A semi-circular vaulted powder magazine, designed in the Séré de Rivières system style of Raymond Adolphe Séré de Rivières, was built under the bastion of the old port at the end of the 19th century.

== World War II ==
The first bombs fell on Calais on May 10, 1940, and then on May 21, 1940. The citadel was placed in a state of defence. The Porte de Neptune and the Porte de Boulogne were closed and a command post was installed in the southwest. On the 24th, while the Germans encircled the city, attacks occurred. The 25th was a dark day during which heavy artillery of the enemy fell on the citadel: the stables burned with all their horses, the barracks collapsed to a large extent, and the emergency stations were overwhelmed. A fire at an oil depot on the west side burned into the Calais sky all day long. Despite the destruction, the defenders rejected the German surrender ultimatum. On the 26th, the casemates trembled under the deluge of bombs falling on the citadel.

The Germans attacked the ramparts with flamethrowers, and went through gaps that began to appear. For lack of ammunition, at 16:30, fighting stopped, making the Germans masters of the place, after a siege that lasted 36 hours. A German officer said, "The citadel did not surrender, it was conquered with arms in hand." More than one building was standing, but all would be razed in the aftermath of the conflict. Many of the defenders of Calais were shot.

== Monuments preserved ==
The porte de Boulogne or porte de secours dating from the end of the 16th century (and remodeled in the 19th century) and the porte de la Ville or the Hermitage dating from the beginning of the 17th century were inscribed as an historic monuments on February 15, 1939. The ditches and curtain walls of the citadel as well as the half-moon defending the entrance to the city were listed as a historic monument on April 27, 1990.

== Peaceful combat ==
In the 1960s, the citadel was converted into a sports stadium and school, including athletic fields for football, rugby, tennis courts, shooting stands, and archery. The S.O.C., Stade Olympique de Calais, resides there, and the reserve of the Calais RUFC, played its games and trained there, before the move to the new Stade de l'Épopée, leaving free, for reserve, the facilities of the Stade Julien-Denis. The citadel is now known as the Stade du Souvenir.

== See also ==
- Siege of Calais

== Bibliography ==
- Le Siège de Calais (Desjonquieres ed.).
- Albin Michel. Les Bourgeois de Calais. Essai sur un mythe historique.
- Calais et l'Histoire - Dépliant publicitaire de 1974 syndicat d'initiative de Calais.
- Calais city history
- Histoire de Calais (Des Beffrois ed.).
- Calais Réalités - Hebdomadaire d'information.
