= Siege of Calais =

Siege of Calais may refer to:

- Siege of Calais (1346–1347), the siege and capture of Calais by the English during the Hundred Years' War
- Siege of Calais (1349), the failed siege by Sir Geoffroi de Charny on December 31, 1348
- Siege of Calais (1436), the failed siege of Calais by Philip the Good, Duke of Burgundy
- Siege of Calais (1558), the siege and capture of the town by the French in the reign of Queen Mary of England
- Siege of Calais (1596), the capture of the town by the Spanish on behalf of the French Catholic League during the French civil war of 1585-98
- Siege of Calais (1940), siege and capture by the Germans during World War II
- Operation Undergo, the Allied siege and capture of Calais in 1944
- L'assedio di Calais, 1836 opera by Gaetano Donizetti about the 1346 siege
