= Braine Castle =

Castle in Braine-le-Château, Belgium

Coordinates: 50.683°N 4.267°E

- Wallonia, Belgium
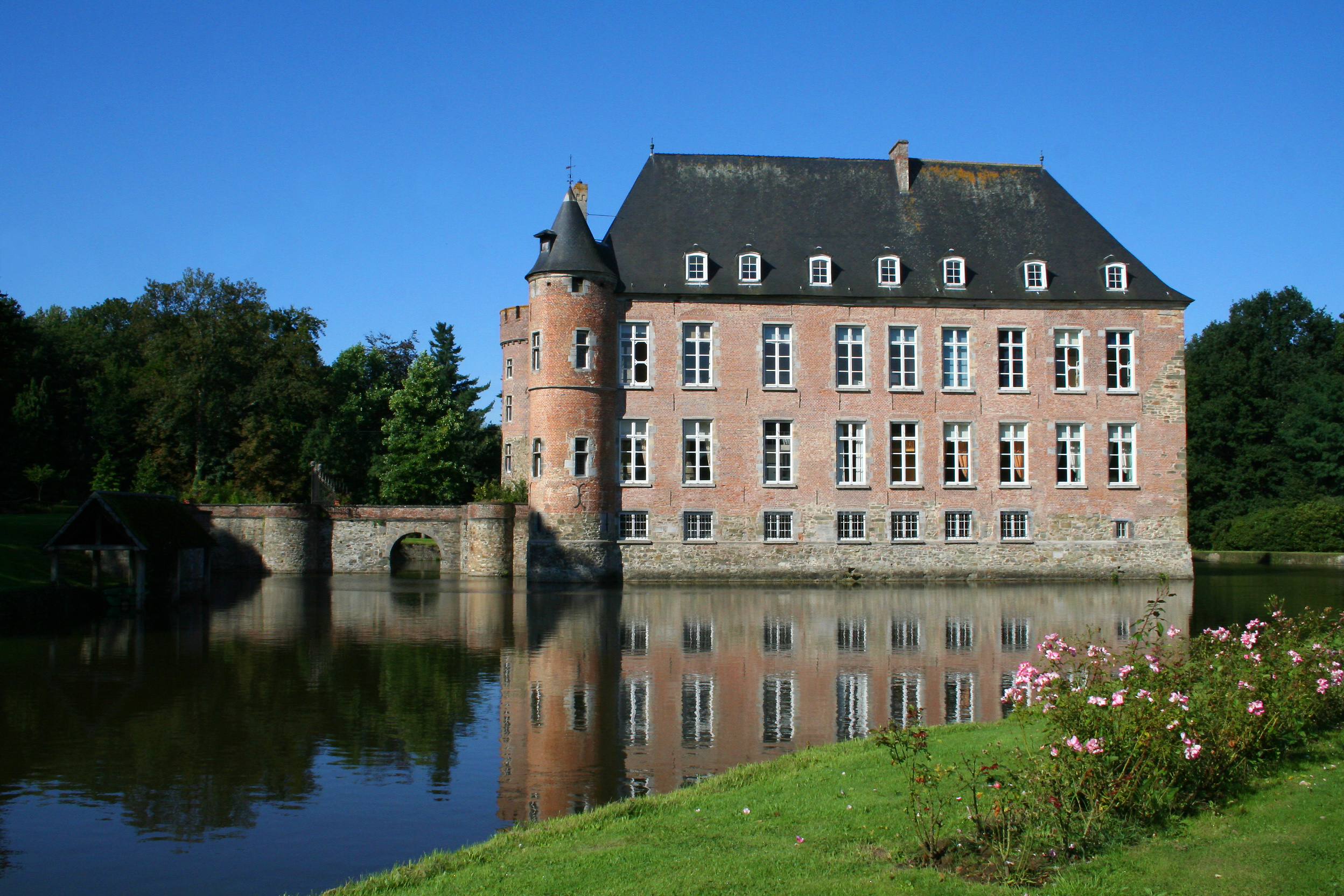

Site information
- Type: Castle

Braine Castle (French: Château de Braine) is a castle in Braine-le-Château, Walloon Brabant, Wallonia, Belgium.

In 649 the Abbess of Mons St. Waudru ceded her "land of Ittre", including Braine, to the Chapter of Mons. Accordingly, Braine had an odd political status since it remained a small enclave of the County of Hainaut within the County of Leuven, part of the Duchy of Brabant. Braine-le-Château was owned by several feudal families. The domain was bought by Jean de Hornes in 1434 and by Lamoral II Claudius Franz, Count of Thurn and Taxis in 1670.

Braine-le-Château is named after a castle (château) built in the place called "Les Monts". In the 11th–12th century, two twinned big artificial hills (mottes) were erected on the top of a spur dominating a village set up on the rivier Hain. Such a twin structure is very infrequent north of the river Loire.
The castle of Braine existed until 1722 but was rebuilt in different places according to the increase of the village. In the beginning of the 13th century, the lords of Trazegnies, owners of the domain, left the spur and built a squarish castle in the middle of a marshy area; the castle was surrounded by a triple barrier made by the marshes, the rivers and the moats. The castle, located in the heart of the village, was used to control the road Nivelles-Halle. In the 16th century, the castle was made less defensive and more pleasant to live in by suppressing the southern wing and increasing the size of the windows, allowing the sun to light the rooms. The castle was burned in 1667 and revamped in 1681, with the addition of a monumental gate. Count Eugène Gaspard de Robiano purchased the castle in 1835 and his descendants still live there.

== See also ==
- List of castles in Belgium
