= David Whetham =

British military ethicist and academic

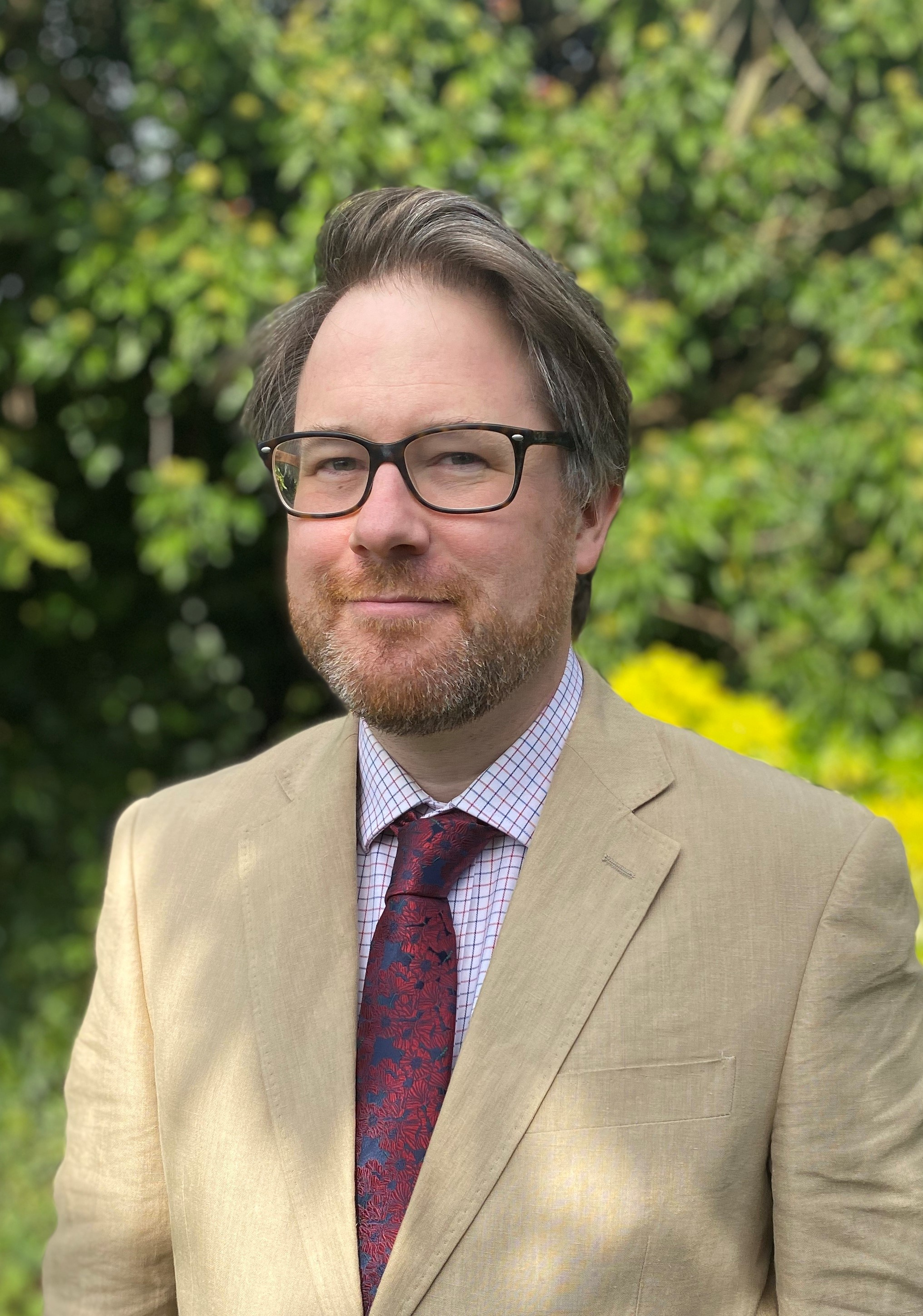
David Whetham

David Glenn Whetham is Professor of Ethics and the Military Profession in the Defence Studies Department of King’s College London.

His teaching and research over the last ten years has been primarily focused on understanding the impact of technology on the normative environment, and improving the provision of military ethics education and training both in the UK and internationally.

== Early life and education ==
Whetham was born in Winchester, Hampshire, and attended secondary school at Wootton Bassett. He completed a B.A. in Philosophy at the London School of Economics, focusing on political philosophy and international relations. He later obtained a master's degree in War Studies from King’s College, London, before gaining a Ph.D. in War Studies. While completing his PhD, Whetham worked as a taxi driver, a BBC researcher and with the OSCE in Kosovo, supporting the 2001 and 2002 elections, before joining King’s as a permanent member of staff in 2003. He was awarded his personal chair in 2018.

== Professional career ==
Primarily based at the Joint Services Command and Staff College at the UK Defence Academy, Whetham coordinates or delivers the military ethics component of courses for between two and three thousand British and international officers a year, as well as engaging in wider activities supporting military ethics education in the UK and internationally. Whetham has been a regular visiting lecturer in military ethics for both the Baltic Defence College in Tartu, Estonia, the Royal Brunei Armed Forces Command and Staff Course, the Colombian War College and the Irish Command and Staff School. He has had Visiting Fellowships at the US Naval Academy, Annapolis (2011), the Centre for Defence Leadership and Ethics in Canberra (2009), and with the University of Glasgow (2014–16), conducting ESRC-funded research into ‘Moral Victories: Ethics, Exit Strategies and the Ending of Wars’. He is currently a PLuS Alliance Fellow, coordinating research activities with King's strategic partners at University of New South Wales and Arizona State University, and a Professorial Visiting Fellow at the University of New South Wales, Canberra. He was appointed as the Jeffrey Grey Distinguished Visiting Fellow at the Australian Defence College in 2023. Whetham was co-founder and remains Vice President of the European Chapter of the International Society for Military Ethics (Euro ISME), which coordinates the promotion of best practice in military ethics education and practices, and holds an annual conference for military practitioners, academics and defence policy-makers.

Whetham is Director of the King's Centre for Military Ethics, established in 2015 with the aim of conducting research into military ethics in order to develop and promote best practice in its education and application. The Centre produces disruptive tools such as the Military Ethics Education Playing Cards to promote military ethics education in innovative ways as well as distance and blended learning materials for both the individual and institutional level, free at the point of delivery. He was awarded a British Academy Mid Career Fellowship in 2017-18 to promote the Centre’s work in producing educational and training materials. Whetham has authored over 60 books, journal articles or chapters. His books include: Ethics, Law and Military Operations (Palgrave, 2010), Just Wars and Moral Victories (Brill, 2009), with Andrea Ellner & Paul Robinson (Eds), When Soldiers Say No: Selective Conscientious Objection in the Modern Military (Ashgate: 2014), and with Deane-Peter Baker and Roger Herbert, The Ethics of Special Ops: Raids, Recoveries, Reconnaissance, and Rebels (Cambridge University Press, 2023).

He has appeared as an expert witness twice on the BBC Radio 4's Moral Maze, on the subjects of Loyalty (Nov 2014) and the 75th Anniversary of D-Day (June 2019). In 2020 Whetham was appointed as an Assistant Inspector-General of the Australian Defence Force to contribute to the Afghanistan Inquiry into allegations of war crimes committed by Australian military personnel. The report was released at a press briefing by the Defence Chief General Campbell in November 2020.

In 2025, Whetham was appointed Honorary Colonel Royal Military Police Army Reserve, by approval of His Majesty The King, succeeding Colonel Simon D’O Duckworth OBE DL. This appointment took effect on 1 April and is initially of three years’ duration.

== Personal life ==
Whetham married in 2003 and has two children. In his spare time, he is a Magistrate on the Wiltshire bench, fences with the medieval longsword and epée, and plays the trombone with the 41 Degrees Big Band.
