= Elspeth Kennedy =

British academic and medievalist

Elspeth Mary Kennedy, MA, DPhil, FSA (6 August 1921 – 10 March 2006) was a British academic and a prominent medievalist. She is best known as the editor and author of works on medieval French literature.

== Early life and education ==
Elspeth Kennedy was born in Berkshire. Her academic career was delayed by World War II, during which she worked for the government — in 1940, while still 18 years of age she began working for MI5, domiciled initially at Wormwood Scrubs and later at Bletchley Park. Because the work, though essential, was repetitive, Kennedy studied Russian in her spare time, and initially laid plans to become a Russian historian. However, when she engaged a tutor to prepare her for entrance to Oxford, the tutor's enthusiasm for French medieval history swayed Kennedy in that direction.

Kennedy attended Somerville College, Oxford, from 1945 to 1947 on a scholarship. She went on to do research, and 1948 embarked on her life's main theme, the Lancelot en prose.

== Academic career ==
Kennedy became a lecturer in French at the University of Manchester in 1953. She became a Fellow of St Hilda's College in 1966 and remained there until her retirement in 1986. She was an Emeritus Fellow of St Hilda's until her death in 2006.

"Her undergraduates loved her, and many became her research students; in French departments across the world there are professors and lecturers who are medievalists because they were inspired by Elspeth's tutorials."

Kennedy was President of the Society for the Study of Medieval Languages and Literature (1984–88), President of the International Arthurian Society (1987–89), and editor of the international journal Medium Aevum ("Middle Ages") from 1990 until 2002. She was a member of the Lancelot committees of the Royal Academy of the Netherlands and of the Huygens Instituut of the Royal Netherlands Academy of Arts and Sciences.

Kennedy received the French Prix Excalibur.

== Bibliography ==
- A Knight's Own Book of Chivalry: Geoffroi de Charny (trans.; intro. Richard W. Kaeuper) (University of Pennsylvania Press, 2005), ISBN 0-8122-1909-0
- The Book of Chivalry of Geoffroi de Charny: Text, Context and Translation (with Richard W. Kaeuper) (University of Pennsylvania Press, 1996), ISBN 0-8122-3348-4
- Shifts and Transpositions in Medieval Narrative: A Festschrift for Dr Elspeth Kennedy (ed. Karen Pratt) (Brewer, 1994), ISBN 0-85991-421-6
- Lancelot of the Lake (intro.; trans. and notes Corin Corley) (Oxford World's Classics, 1989), ISBN 0-19-281756-6
- Lancelot and the Grail: A Study of the Prose Lancelot (Clarendon Press, 1986), ISBN 0-19-815811-4
- Lancelot do Lac: The Non-cyclic Old French Prose Romance (2 vols., ed.) (OUP, 1980), ISBN 0-19-812064-8
- Social and Political Ideas in the French Prose Lancelot: A Note on The Breton Lays Mediumaevum Vol XXVI (with Rachel Bromwich) (Dawson, 1965)
