= Martin Braine =

Martin D. S. Braine
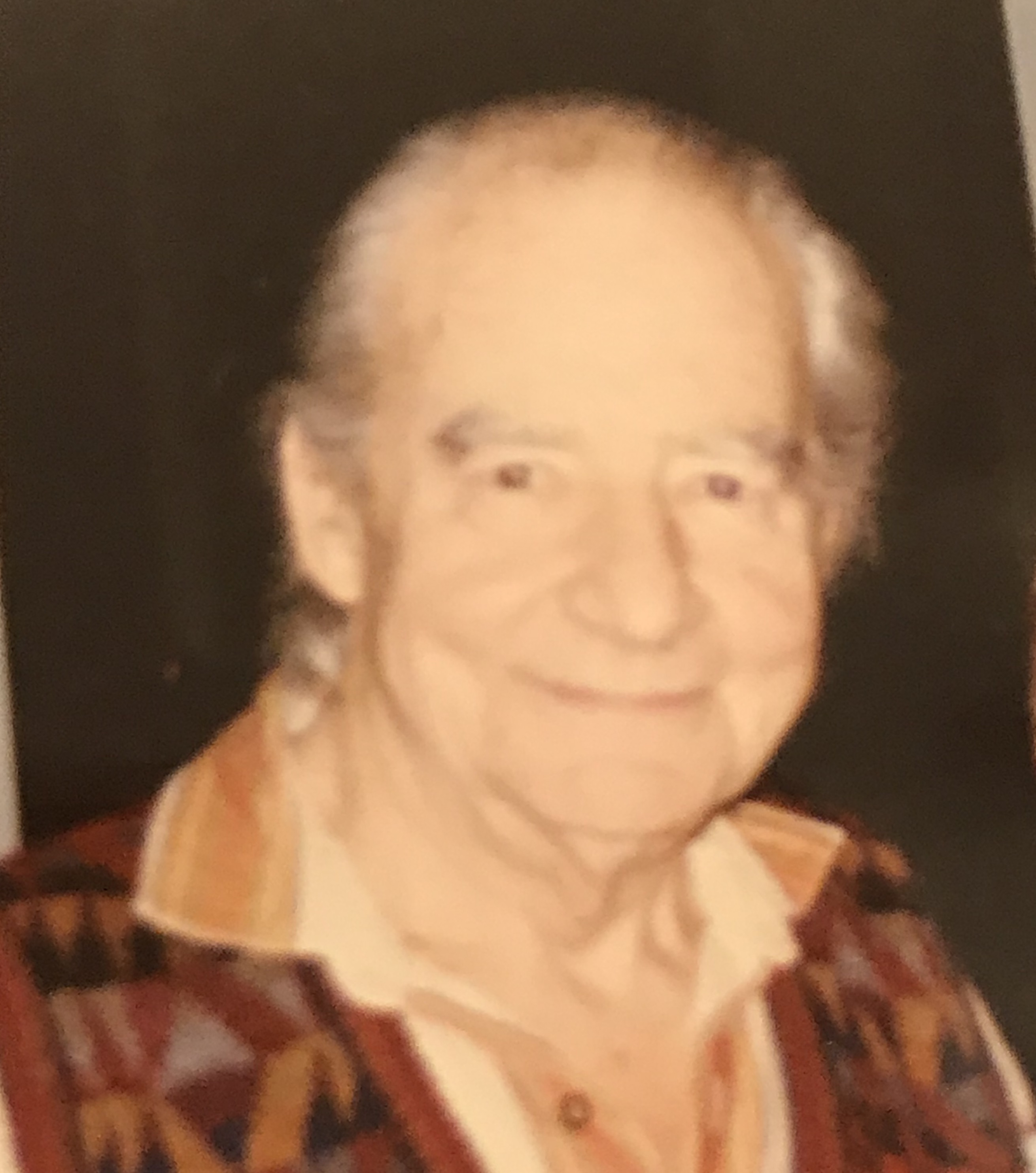
- Born: June 3, 1926; Kuala Lumpur, Malaysia
- Died: April 6, 1996 (aged 69); New York, New York, US
- Spouse: Lila Braine
- Children: 2
- Awards: Guggenheim Fellow (1965)

Academic background
- Education: Birmingham University (BS); University of London (BS); New York University (PhD)

Academic work
- Discipline: Psychologist
- Sub-discipline: Language development
- Institutions: University of California, Santa Barbara; New York University

Martin Dimond Stewart Braine (June 3, 1926 – April 6, 1996) was a British-American cognitive psychologist known for his research on the development of language and reasoning. He was Professor of Psychology at New York University at the time of his death.

Braine was well known for his research on mental logic. He theorized that people naturally make deductive inferences based on their knowledge of natural language terms like if, all, any, and not. Such terms are understood through an intuitive logic that supports commonsense reasoning, but may also produce reasoning fallacies or errors. This natural mental logic was viewed as distinct from the standard logic of mathematicians and philosophers in terms of the inferences it licensed. In contrast to Philip Johnson-Laird and others who suggested that people rely on mental models as opposed to logic when reasoning, Braine took the position that people rely on both mental logic and mental models, with the former closely tied to processes of linguistic comprehension.

Braine edited the volumes Categories and Processes in Language Acquisition by Yonata Levy and Izchak Schlesinger, and Mental Logic with David O'Brien.

== Biography ==
Braine was born in Kuala Lumpur on June 3, 1926. He was the son of Edith Braine, a teacher, and Charles Dimond Conway Braine, a civil engineer. His younger brother was the British philosopher David Dimond Conway Braine.

Braine received his B.S. degree in mechanical engineering in 1946 at University of Birmingham in England. He subsequently attended the University of London where he received a B.S. in psychology. In London he attended lectures by Jean Piaget, which influenced his later research on the development of logical reasoning.

Braine continued his education at New York University where he received his Ph.D. in psychology in 1957 under the supervision of Elsa Robinson. Braine worked at SUNY Downstate Medical Center and later at Walker Reed Army Medical Center as a researcher before joining the faculty of the Department of Psychology at the University of California, Santa Barbara. He was awarded a Guggenheim Fellowship in 1965. Braine moved to New York University in 1971 where he remained for the duration of his career.

Braine married Lila (Rosensveig) Ghent in 1960. Lila Braine was a professor of psychology at Barnard College, Columbia University. They had a son Jonathan in 1961 and a daughter Naomi in 1964. Braine died of cancer in New York City on April 6, 1996.

== Research on Language Development ==
Braine conducted research on child language development and engaged in the empiricism-nativism debate. Prior to Noam Chomsky's arguments for innate linguistic universals, there was a strong belief that the structures of language were learned from the input. Braine offered a compromise position that language acquisition was a process of mapping utterances onto a syntax of thought, supported by semantic primitives and a mental logic.

Braine proposed that when learning language, young children use "limited scope" formula to produce their first word combinations, with each formula consisting of a relational term with a slot to be filled (e.g. all gone ____). Braine's view that toddlers learn the combinatorial properties of words on an item-by-item basis paved the way for usage-based, lexicalist approaches to grammatical development. Other work focused on learners' acquisition of grammatical gender categories and their reliance on probabilistic cues to acquire grammatical structure. Braine's research emphasized how linguistic patterns are discovered and strengthened through use and repetition.

== Representative Publications ==
- Braine, M. D. S. (1963). On learning the grammatical order of words. Psychological Review, 70(4), 323–348.
- Braine, M. D. S. (1963). The ontogeny of English phrase structure: The first phase. Language, 39(1), 1–13.
- Braine, M. D. S.(1978). On the relation between the natural logic of reasoning and standard logic. Psychological Review, 85(1), 1-21.
- Braine, M. D. S., & Brooks, P. J. (1995). Verb argument structure and the problem of avoiding an overgeneral grammar. In M. Tomasello & W. E. Merriman (Eds.), Beyond names for things: Young children's acquisition of verbs (pp. 353–376). Hillsdale, NJ: Erlbaum.
- Braine, M. D. S., & O'Brien, D. P. (1991). A theory of if: A lexical entry, reasoning program, and pragmatic principles. Psychological Review, 98(2), 182–203.
- Braine, M. D. S., & Rumain, B. (1981). Development of comprehension of “or”: Evidence for a sequence of competencies. Journal of Experimental Child Psychology, 31(1), 46–70.
- Braine, M. D. S., & David P. O'Brien (eds.) (1998). Mental Logic, Mahwah, New Jersey London: Lawrence Erlbaum Associates.
