= PLuS Alliance =

Educational model

PLuS Alliance describes the educational cluster model formed by three academic research universities in different parts of the world, aiming to undertake cross-border research collaborations to tackle globally-important issues related to social justice, health, innovation and sustainability

The PLuS Alliance is a collaborative effort of three universities: King's College London, Arizona State University, and the University of New South Wales. Together these three institutions comprise a body of over 15,000 staff, 150,000 students and more than one billion dollars in research funds.

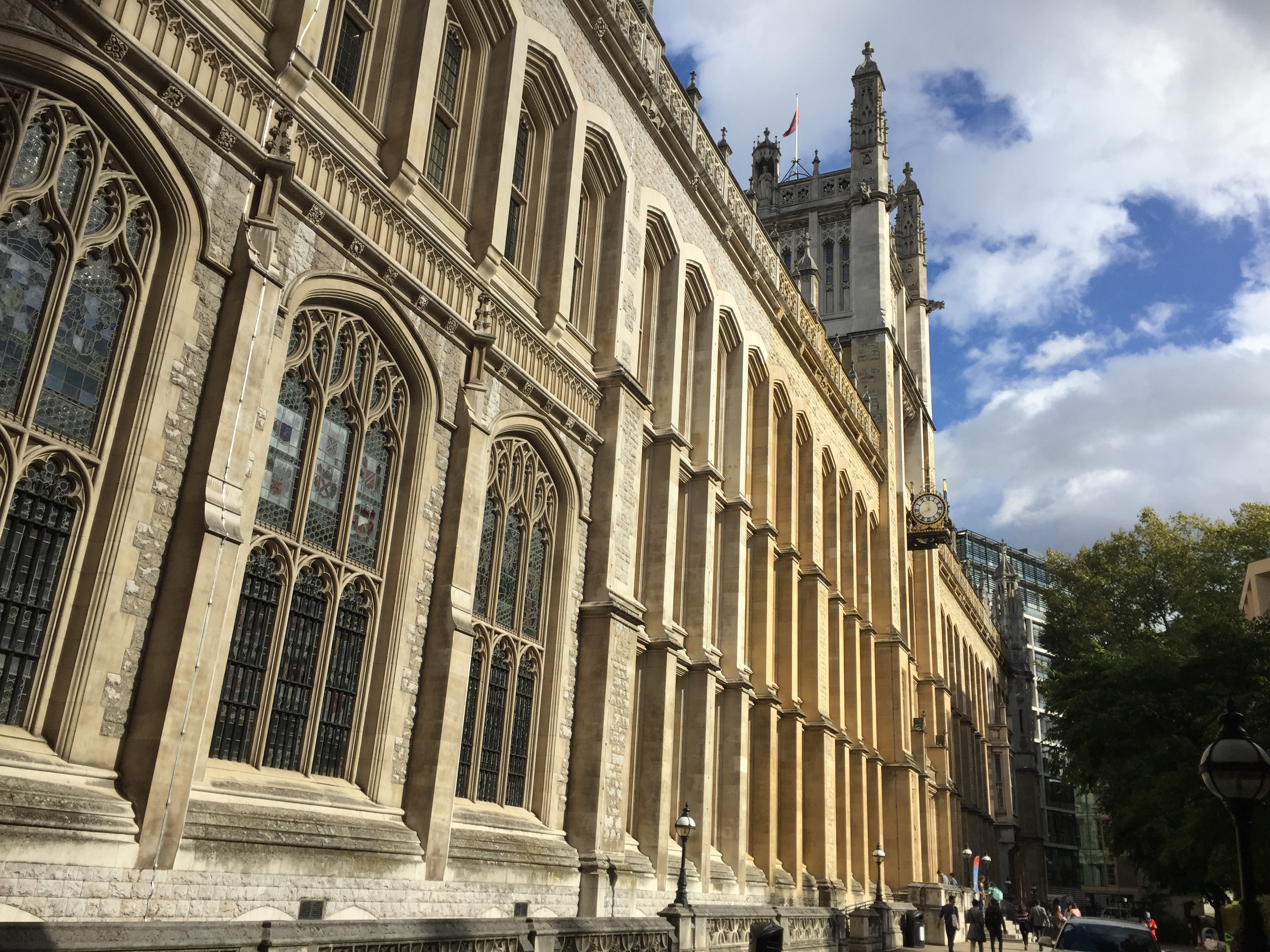
King's College London

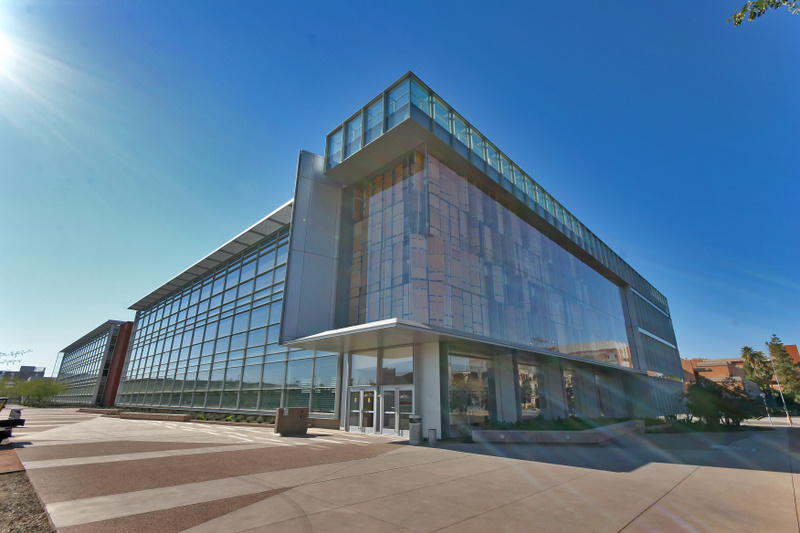
Arizona State University

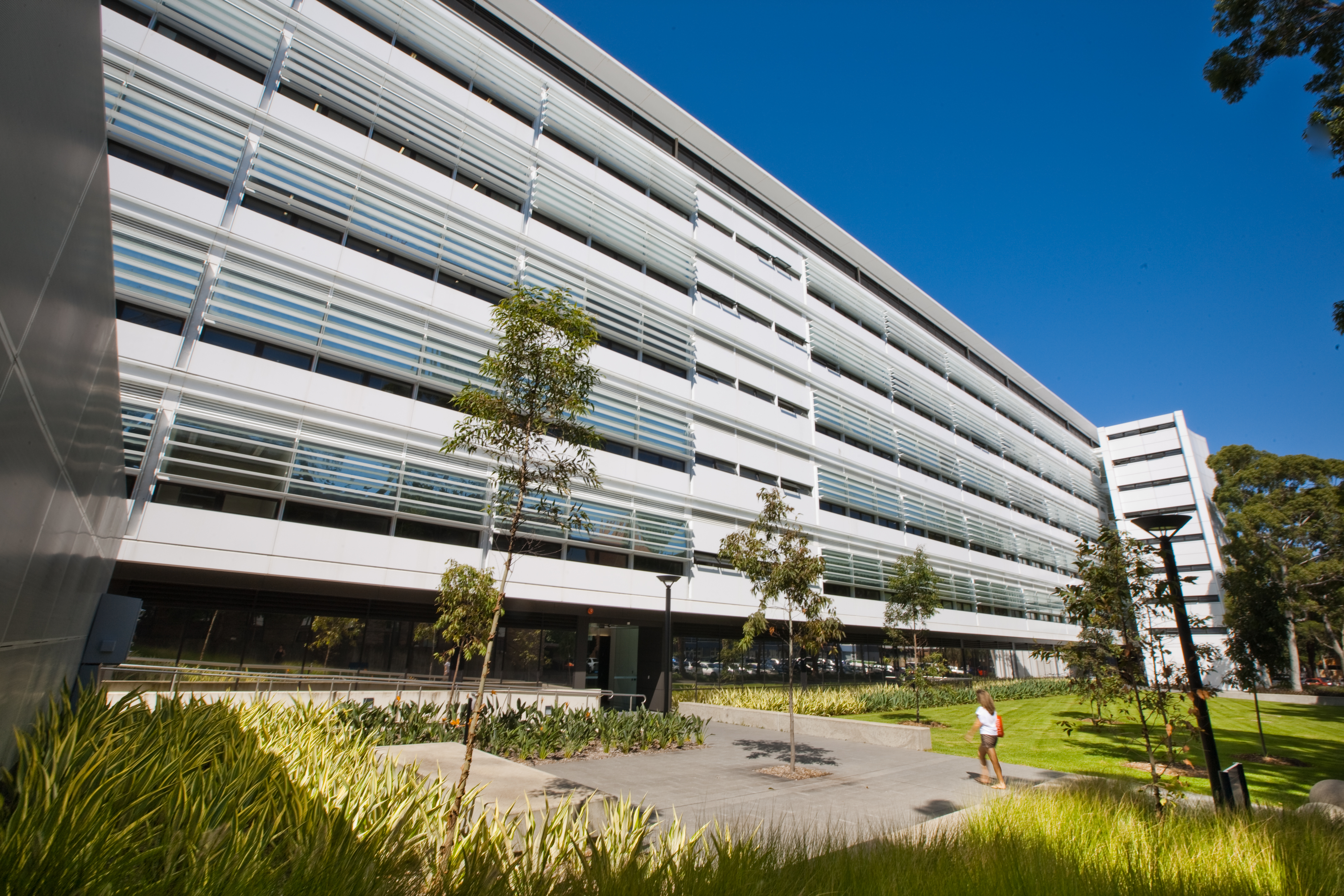
University of New South Wales

== See also ==
- King's College London
- Arizona State University
- University of New South Wales
