= Robert Braine =

American composer (1896–1940)

Robert Braine (1896–1940) was an American composer. A native of Ohio, he studied at the College of Music in Cincinnati. He worked as a recital accompanist and as an organist; he also edited for a time, and was a staff pianist for NBC in New York City. He composed three operas, Virginia, Diane, and The Eternal Light; he also wrote Top Hole, a musical comedy. He composed a handful of chamber works and some orchestral pieces. Of the latter, 1928's S.O.S. has been claimed as the first classical work written specifically for radio broadcast.
