= David Braine (philosopher) =

British analytic philosopher (1940–2017)

- Born: 2 September 1940
- Died: 17 February 2017 (aged 77); Aberdeen Royal Infirmary, Aberdeen
- Resting place: Pluscarden Abbey, Elgin, Scotland
- Occupation: Analytic philosopher
- Parents: Charles Dimond Conway Braine (father); Edith Braine (mother)

David Dimond Conway Braine (2 September 1940 – 17 February 2017) was a British analytic philosopher with interests in analytic philosophy of religion and metaphysics, who sought to marry the techniques and insights of analytical philosophy and phenomenology to the metaphysics of classical Thomism.

== Biography ==
Braine attended Magdalen College, Oxford University, where he was influenced by the analytic philosopher Elizabeth Anscombe. At Oxford, he completed Honour Moderations in Physics (1959) and degrees in history (B.A.1962; M.A. 1965) and Philosophy (B.Phil. 1965). From 1965 to 1989, he was a lecturer in the School of Divinity, History and Philosophy at the University of Aberdeen.

Braine was the son of Edith Braine, a teacher, and Charles Dimond Conway Braine, a civil engineer. His older brother was the British-American psychologist Martin Braine.

Due to a car accident in 1977, he became paralyzed from the chest down. Braine was opposed to the legalization of euthanasia, and based some of that opposition on his own personal experience of living with a disability.

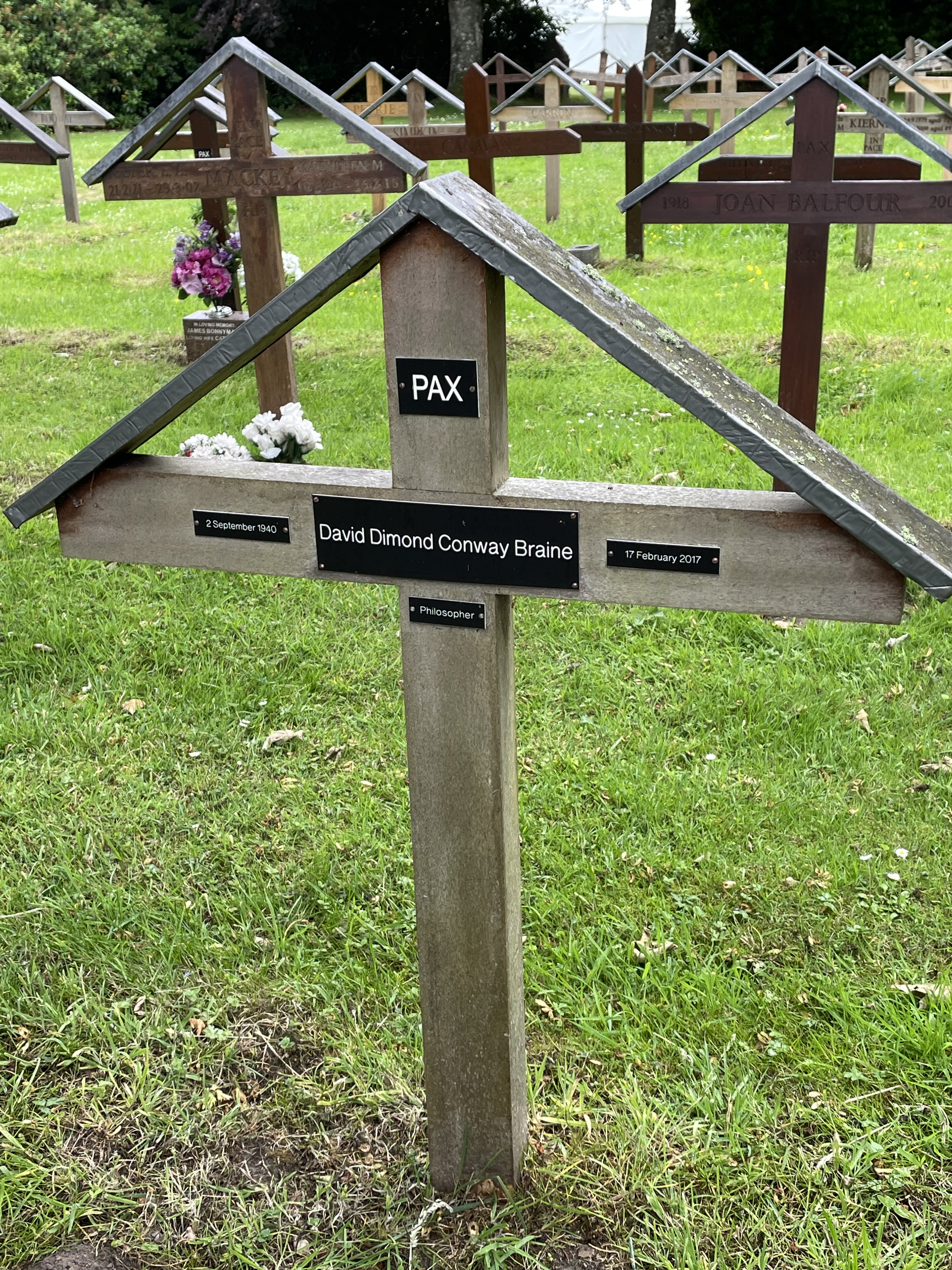
Memorial marker at Pluscarden Abbey

Braine is buried at Pluscarden Abbey, near Elgin, Scotland.

== Philosophical work ==
His The Reality of Time and the Existence of God set out to prove the existence of God from the fact that the world enjoys continuity in time. He argued that nothing in the world could be the cause of this continuity, whence God came into the picture.

His book The Human Person: Animal and Spirit attempts to provide a philosophical analysis of human beings which makes life after death possible. The book argues against dualism and materialism whilst defending the views of Thomas Aquinas.

Braine's work addressed issues including the nature of God's presence in the world, secondary causation, and the compatibility between an eternal God and the idea that God created time.

== Books ==
- David Braine, (1983), Medical Ethics and Human Life, Palladio.
- David Braine, (1988), The Reality of Time and the Existence of God, OUP.
- David Braine, (1992, 1993), The Human Person: Animal and Spirit, University of Notre Dame Press.
- David Braine, (2014), Language and Human Understanding: The Roots of Creativity in Speech and Thought, The Catholic University of America Press.
- David Braine and Harry Lesser (eds.), (1988), Ethics, Technology and Medicine, Avebury.

== Articles ==
=== Papers in Metaphysics ===
- David Braine, (1971), 'The Nature of Knowledge.', Proceedings of the Aristotelian Society, 72.
- David Braine, (1972), 'Varieties of Necessity.', Proceedings of the Aristotelian Society, Supplementary Volume, 46.

=== Papers in the Philosophy of Mind ===
- David Braine, (1994) 'Reply to David Cockburn's Discussion', Religious Studies.
- David Braine, (2002) 'The Active and Potential Intellects: Aquinas as a Philosopher in his own right.' In John Haldane (ed.), Mind, Metaphysics, and Value in the Thomistic and Analytical Traditions. University of Notre Dame Press.

=== Papers in Ethics ===
- David Braine, (1981), 'Why Abortion?', in Light in the Darkness, Unity Press, Mowbray.
- David Braine, (1988), 'Human animality: its relevance to the shape of ethics.' In David Braine and Harry Lesser (eds.) Ethics, Technology and Medicine, Avebury.
- David Braine, (1988), 'Human life: its secular sacrosanctness.' In David Braine and Harry Lesser (eds.) Ethics, Technology and Medicine, Avebury.
- David Braine, (1994), 'The Human and the Inhuman in Medicine; Review of Issues concerning Reproductive Technology.' In Luke Gormally (ed.) Moral Truth and Moral Tradition, Four Courts, Dublin.

=== Papers in the Philosophy of Religion ===
- David Braine, (1994), 'God, Eternity and Time', Evangelical Quarterly 66.
- David Braine, (1998), 'Cosmological Arguments', in Brian Davies (ed.), Philosophy of Religion, Cassell.
- David Braine, (1999), 'Philosophy and Cultures', Reflections on Fides et Ratio, no. 14, English trans. in L'Osservatore Romano (weekly English edition), 4 August.
- David Braine, (2006), 'Aquinas, God and Being'. In Craig Paterson and Matthew Pugh (eds.) Analytical Thomism: Traditions in Dialogue (Ashgate).

=== Papers in Theology ===
- 'Observations on the Trinity: a reply to Professor Lochman.' 1976. Theology, 1976.
- 'The Place of the Virgin Mary in Dogmatics.' 1984. Scottish Journal of Theology.
- 'The Inner Jewishness of St John's Gospel as the clue to the Inner Jewishness of Jesus.' 1998. Studien zum Neuen Testament und Seiner Umwelt, 13: 101–157.
- 'What Makes a Christology into a Christian Christology?' 1996. New Blackfriars 70.

=== Reviews ===
- David Braine, (1968), Review of Anselm's discovery: a re-examination of the ontological proof for God's existence by Charles Hartshorne. (La Salle, Open Court Publishing Co., USA, 1965) in Mind.
- David Braine, (1994), Review of From Existence to God by Barry Miller (Routledge, London, UK, (1992) in New Blackfriars 75: 228–30.
- David Braine, (1994), Review of Medicine, Money and Morals by Mark A. Rodwin (OUP, New York City, 1993) in 16 Sep issue of The Times Higher Education Supplement.
- David Braine, (2000), Review of Redirecting Philosophy: Reflections on the Nature of Knowledge from Plato to Lonergan by Hugo A. Meynell, Toronto: University of Toronto Press, 1998 in International Philosophical Quarterly, 40.
