= John of Horne (1380–1436) =

Belgian-Dutch nobleman (1380–1436)

John of Horne (Dutch: Jan van Hoorn; French: Jean de Hornes; c. 1380 – 22 August 1436), lord of Baucignies, was an Admiral of Flanders.

He was a son of Arnold of Horne and Joanna of Hondschoote. From his father he inherited the Lordships of Baucigny, Montcornet, Heeze and Leende. From his mother he inherited the Lordships Hondschoote, Houtkerque, Lokeren, Veurne and Sint-Winoksbergen. He also obtained Gaasbeek in 1434.

John of Horne was Seneschal of Brabant and Grand Chamberlain of both John the Fearless and Philip the Good. In 1420 he was knighted during the siege of Melun. He also became keeper of Castle Loevestein after the abdication of Jacqueline, Countess of Hainaut.

John of Horne is best known for his role in the 1436 Siege of Calais. Philip the Good besieged the English-held city and as Admiral of Flanders, it was John's task to block the harbor of Calais. He sank 5 to 6 ships laden with stone in the harbor entrance, but the people of Calais were able to approach these wrecks during low tide and dismantled them. Furthermore, John was forced to return his fleet to Holland because of bad weather. His failure to block the harbor contributed to the overall failure of the siege.

After the siege, Humphrey, Duke of Gloucester led an expeditionary army into Flanders and English pirates plundered the Flemish coast. Unable to stop these English raids, John of Horne was held accountable by the Flemish people and he was lynched in the dunes near Ostend.

John married Margareth de la Tremouille in 1410, and they had one son, Philip (1421).
