= Book of Chivalry =

Early 1350s book by Geoffroy of Charny

The Book of Chivalry (French: Livre de chevalerie) was written by the knight Geoffroi de Charny (c.1306-1356) sometime around the early 1350s. The treatise is intended to explain the appropriate qualities for a knight, reform the behavior of the fighting classes, and defend the chivalric ethos against its critics, mainly in clerical circles.

== Author and context ==
Geoffroi de Charny was intensely involved in the first phase of the Anglo-French conflict known as the Hundred Years' War. The first record of his campaigns against the English appear in 1337, and despite being captured twice, Charny grew in prestige from a minor member of the nobility to one of the most respected knights in France, especially under the kingship of Jean II of France. Jean created the Company of the Star in 1352, intending the chivalric order to outshine that of his rival, Edward III of England, who had shortly before created the Order of the Garter. Charny was promptly made a member of the Company of the Star, and it is believed that he wrote his Book of Chivalry in this context. However, the company began to lose members immediately due to losses on the battlefield, both in civil wars and against the English. In 1356, Jean II was captured during the Battle of Poitiers, leading to the complete breakdown of the order. It was in this same battle that Charny, along with many other French knights, died exemplifying the chivalric ethos that he described in his treatise.

== Major themes ==
Charny's book is unique in its focus. Unlike earlier works such as Vegetius' De Re Militari, or later ones such as Christine de Pizan's The Book of Deeds of Arms and of Chivalry, Charny's Book of Chivalry is not intended as a manual for how to conduct military operations. He approaches his subject from a conceptual basis, explaining the qualities associated with worthy knights. Moreover, although he does touch upon issues of courtliness, he is more preoccupied with the maintenance of knightly hardiness and war-readiness. For Charny, the essence of knighthood is prowess, and all of his various themes solidify the importance of this concept.

=== Levels of worthiness ===
Charny is unwilling to dismiss even slight displays of chivalry, but does insist on prioritizing deeds of arms. The worthiness of these deeds is assessed by the degree of danger, pain, and suffering that they entail. Thus, Charny begins his work by describing feats performed in tournaments and jousts, staged conflicts that could still be quite violent. Charny notes “Indeed they are worthy of praise; nevertheless, he who does more is of greater worth.” (This is a refrain repeated in various formats throughout the book.) Charny follows this section by describing feats done in real war, then arguing that the added danger gives such feats more intrinsic worth. A similar theme emerges throughout the book: those feats that involve less danger or are performed for shallow reasons are still chivalrous and worthy of honor, but deeds involving great peril and done for pure motives bring a knight greater glory and renown.

=== Responsibilities of rulers and great men ===
Charny is intensely concerned that the most powerful members of society set a positive example for the lower orders, and especially for young knights. After acknowledging that knights of higher social standing—the “valiant lords” of society—may receive greater renown than worthier poor knights, he defends this feature of chivalry by explaining that it is because a noble lord can patronize, inspire, and cultivate other knights in the ways of valor. Nevertheless, Charny emphasizes that such lords have greater demands upon their deportment because their fame ensures that any scandal associated with their names will produce more notoriety than with a lesser-known knight. Thus, the great lords in particular must be temperate in their eating habits, avoid gambling and greed, indulge only in honorable pastimes such as jousting and maintaining the company of ladies, keep any romantic liaisons secret, and—most importantly—only be found in the company of worthy men.

If Charny emphasizes the high moral standard expected of “great men,” his ideal monarch has an even higher caliber of morality to attain. In a section full of repetitive parallelisms, Charny argues that the ancestors of contemporary rulers were chosen from among the people, not for a life of ease and corruption, but for service, nobility, and piety.

=== Chivalric reform ===
Charny's advice for rulers and great men is one facet of a wider push for knightly reform. In particular, Charny criticizes what he sees as the growth in indolence and love of luxury. Many of his passages warn against the atrophying power of a pleasurable lifestyle, as well as the spiritual and physical advantages of a more spartan regime. Thus, he advises that knights be temperate in their eating habits, seek hard lodgings rather than soft beds at night, and most importantly, avoid luxurious cloths. In fact, he spends a lengthy section mocking at nobles who all but bared their private parts by wearing tight leggings under tunics that did not fully cover the offending areas. This “shameful” dress is exacerbated in Charny's view by an excessive love of jewels and fine cloth.

=== The role of women ===
Although he shows a lack of interest when it comes to courtly love, Charny does not entirely ignore the role of women, analyzing their effect upon and reception of knightly conduct. One of the primary roles he assigns to ladies is the ability to inspire great feats of arm in the knights who have pledged themselves to their love. Charny is convinced that such great ladies share the chivalric values of their men. Thus, a lady will feel pride when her lover is showered with praise and honor by his peers, but shame if he has not performed any great deeds. In fact, Charny argues that a noble lady should abandon any lover who fails in prowess, and that the unfortunate knight has no cause to resent this treatment, since it is his own fault. Lastly, Charny emphasizes that women have no recourse to chivalry in order to achieve honor, arguing the necessity for them to adorn themselves with the jewels and fine clothes so inappropriate for men. Only by dressing beautifully and behaving gracefully can women achieve social respect comparable to that of a chivalrous knight.

=== Knighting ceremony ===
Charny's treatise also contains one of the most detailed and straightforward descriptions of a dubbing ceremony. The day before the ceremony, a knight should make his confession, followed by a long bath and a short repose in a bed of clean white sheets. Afterward, he is to be dressed by other knights: new, clean white linens, followed by a red tunic, black hose, white belt, and a red cloak. The knight will keep vigil until the following morning, when he hears Mass and receives Communion. He then receives two gilded spurs and a double-edged sword. Finally, the knights in charge of dubbing him receive him with a kiss and a collee (a light blow). All of these stages are imbued with religious symbolism, adding a Christianizing layer to an essentially secular ceremony.

=== Orders of society ===
Charny also considers the role of knighthood within the larger context of society, discussing three other “orders” in Christendom: the order of marriage, monastic orders, and the priesthood. In discussing both the order of marriage and the monastic world, Charny follows his traditional formula of good-better-best when describing the relative worthiness of those entering into each state. It is good for a man to enter either order late in life, bad for him to enter the order in his middle years, but ideal for him to enter into it as a youth, since those who do so are more likely to be sincere in their commitment. One's motives for entering each state also affect the worthiness of the calling.

The order of priesthood Charny holds in rather higher esteem than the first two, claiming that those entering this order must learn its service in detail in their youth so that they can perform it faithfully. This office is so noble that priests should be entirely exempt from other offices.

=== Knightly virtue and salvation ===
Despite praising other orders of society, Charny considers knighthood to be the greatest of these orders. Drawing upon medieval ascetic ideals, Charny presents the life of the knight as a sort of passion of suffering and danger. He claims that the trials associated with the knight's lifestyle outshine even the harshest penances imposed upon monks, thus making it of greater spiritual worth. Moreover, the knight's life is full of peril and the possibility of dying any time, any place. Thus, Charny concludes his book by pointing out that awareness of their own mortality forced knights, more than any other sector of society, to be prepared at any moment to meet their Creator.
