= Siege of Calais (1436) =

- Part of Hundred Years' War (last phase)
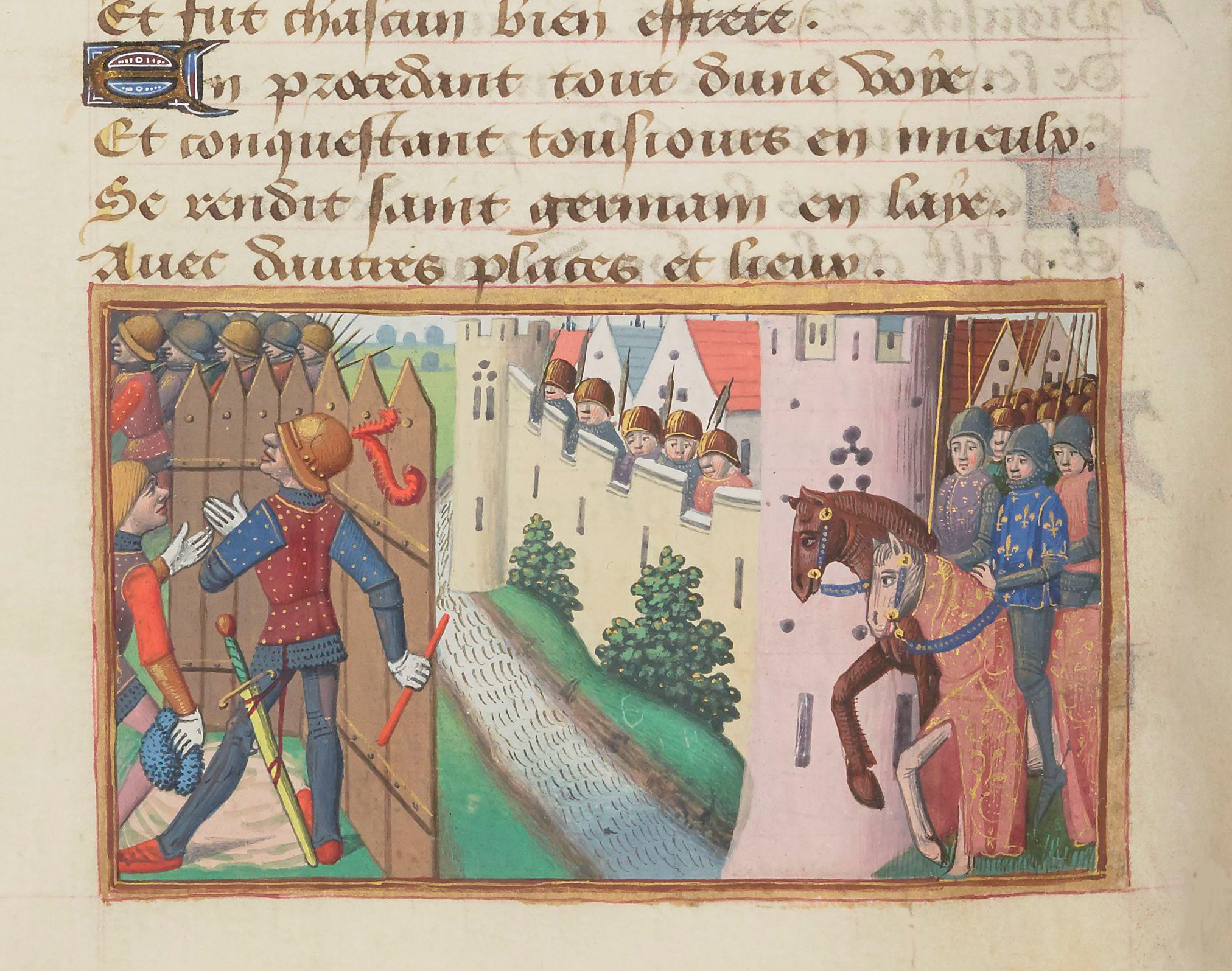
- Siege of Calais (illustration from Vigiles de Charles VII)
Date	9–29 July 1436
Location	Pale of Calais, English France 50.9481°N 1.8564°E
Result	English victory

Belligerents
Kingdom of England	Burgundian State

Commanders and leaders
Edmund Beaufort; Humphrey, Duke of Gloucester (relief)	Philip the Good; Jean II de Croÿ; John of Horne

Strength
2,000 (garrison); 10,000 (relief)	30,000

Casualties and losses
Unknown	Unknown

The siege of Calais between June and July 1436 was a failed siege of English-held Calais by Philip the Good, Duke of Burgundy, and Flemish militia.

== Prelude ==
England and Burgundy had been allies against France in the Hundred Years' War since 1419. But when the English walked out of peace talks during the Congress of Arras in 1435, the Duke of Burgundy stayed and concluded the Treaty of Arras with the French King on 21 September 1435, thus switching sides in the war. The Duke's betrayal caused an outrage among the English, and the London populace was allowed to plunder possessions of Flemish, Dutch and Picard merchants in the city, all subjects of the Duke of Burgundy. There was also an incursion in the Duke's territories by an English force of 2,000 men, who defeated 1,500 Flemish soldiers under Jean II de Croÿ in the Boulonnais.

Philip the Good reacted by declaring war on England. In this, he was supported by the Flemish cities, who saw their trade with England menaced.

== The siege ==
The obvious target of the Duke was Calais. He first conquered some smaller English strongholds, like Oye castle (where he hanged part of the garrison), Sangatte and Balinghem. In June he started the siege of Calais, supported by large numbers of Flemish and Picard militia. The Flemish cities in fact saw a chance to deal with the Calais Staple. In total, the Duke had some 30,000 men at his disposal. He also sent a force under Jean II de Croÿ to besiege Guînes.

The militia had been very eager to take Calais quickly, but when after a few weeks it became apparent that the city, under the command of Edmund Beaufort, Count of Mortain, was well defended and provisioned, the enthusiasm quickly decreased. When a fleet under Admiral John of Horne failed to block the harbor of Calais by sinking five to six ships laden with stone, the Flemish army started to disintegrate.

When an English relief army of some 10,000 men under Humphrey, Duke of Gloucester approached, the Duke of Burgundy had no option but to raise the sieges of Calais and Guînes and withdraw.

== Aftermath ==
The failed siege was a humiliating defeat for the Duke. The fatalities included Guy of Burgundy, Lord of Kruibeke, a son of John the Fearless and his mistress Marguerite de Borsele, and Philip the Good's half brother. Skirmishes with the English and English piracy seriously disturbed the Flemish economy in the following years. But as the English economy also depended on trade with Flanders, peace was finally concluded in 1439.

Calais remained under English control until 1558.

== See also ==
- Siege of Calais (1346)
- Battle of Calais
- Siege of Calais (1558)
- Siege of Calais (1596)
- Siege of Calais (1940)
