= Richard W. Kaeuper =

American medievalist historian

Richard William Kaeuper is an American medievalist historian. He was a student of, and mentored by, Joseph Strayer, the noted Princeton scholar. Kaeuper grew up in Richmond, Indiana.

== Education ==
Kaeuper earned his PhD from Princeton in 1967, and thereafter held several posts, finishing in his present position as professor of medieval history at the University of Rochester. He is active in several scholarly organizations among them De Re Militari.

== Career ==
Professor Kaeuper is regarded as an influential scholar in the field, known both for his thorough work and for his use of literary sources as historical evidence.

He has published extensively on topics ranging from law and finance to his more recent works on chivalry, culminating in the definitive general volume on chivalry, published by Cambridge University Press.

Professor Kaeuper has also won numerous teaching awards.

In 2015, Kaeuper was selected to become a Fellow of the Medieval Academy of America.

In 2017, Brill published a festschrift entitled Prowess, Piety, and Public Order in Medieval Society: Essays in Honor of Richard W. Kaeuper. It was co-edited by Craig M Nakashian and Daniel P. Franke (two of Kaeuper's doctoral students) and featured nineteen scholarly articles by his colleagues and former students.

== Bibliography ==
- The Tension Between Vengeance and Mercy in Chivalric Mentalite (forthcoming)
- Medieval Chivalry (Cambridge 2016)
- Kings, Knights and Bankers (edited by Christopher Guyol) (Brill 2015)
- Law, Governance, and Justice: New Views on Medieval Constitutionalism (editor, with assistance of Paul Dingman and Peter Sposato) (Brill 2013)
- Holy Warriors: The Religious Ideology of Chivalry (Univ. of Pennsylvania 2009)
- Violence in Medieval Society (editor) (Boydell 2000)
- Chivalry and Violence in Medieval Europe (Oxford 1999)
- The Book of Chivalry of Geoffroi de Charny: Text, Context, and Translation (with Elspeth Kennedy) (Univ. of Pennsylvania 1996), paperback version (without French text): A Knight's Own Book of Chivalry (2005)
- War, Justice and Public Order: England and France in the Later Middle Ages (Clarendon Press, Oxford 1988) (French Translation: Aubier-Flammarion 1994)
- An Historian's Reading of The Tale of Gamelyn (Medium & AELIG vol. 52, 1983)
- Law and Order in Fourteenth-Century England: The Evidence of Special Commissions of Oyer and Terminer (Speculum vol. 54, 1979)
- Bankers to the Crown: The Riccardi of Lucca and Edward I (Princeton Univ. 1973)
