= Amery of Pavy =

14th-century English knight

Amery of Pavy (also Aimeric, Aimery, Aymer, or Emeric in various sources; Italian: Amerigo) or of Pavia (died 1352) was a 14th-century English knight, originally from Pavia in Lombardy, who was made captain of Calais by King Edward III of England in 1347. He made a secret deal with Sir Geoffrey de Charny, a French knight, to sell Calais for 20,000 écus (approximately £4,700,000 in 2025 terms (Note: UK Retail Price Index inflation figures are based on data from Clark, Gregory (2017). "The Annual RPI and Average Earnings for Britain, 1209 to Present (New Series)". MeasuringWorth. Retrieved 28 October 2018. To give a very rough idea of earning power, an English foot-soldier could expect to earn £1 in wages for, usually seasonal, military service in approximately 3 months.)). After discovering the plot, Edward summoned Amery to London and confronted him, ordering him to keep his bargain with Geoffrey and say nothing of the king's knowledge. As Geoffrey gathered an army to take control of the town in December of that year, Edward brought an army from England to counter the French. The English then prevailed in the failed siege of Calais on 31 December 1349, and Edward transferred governance of Calais to John de Beauchamp and abated the arms of Amery in 1350. In 1352, Amery was captured and tortured to death by Charny.

== Captain of Calais ==
After Edward took possession of Calais on 4 August 1347, he negotiated a treaty with Philip VI of France on 28 September under the mediation of the Pope, which truce was set to expire on 8 July 1348, but was subsequently continued until 1355. Edward appointed Amery of Pavy captain of Calais and ordered the restoration of the city's fortifications while he returned to England, landing at Sandwich on 12 October 1347.

== Sale of Calais ==
Some time in 1349, without the knowledge of either Edward or Philip, Amery entered into a secret agreement with Geoffrey de Charny, a French knight and governor of nearby Saint-Omer, for the sale of Calais to Geoffrey in exchange for the sum of 20,000 écus. Upon discovery of the plot, Edward summoned Amery to London and upbraided him for his betrayal, ordering him to keep the bargain with Geoffrey and inform him before the French arrival. Amery informed the king, who brought an expeditionary force under the command of Sir Walter Manny to ambush Geoffrey's forces in December 1349. On the last day of December, Geoffrey arrived before dawn with 500 lancers to occupy the city. Amery received his payment of 20,000 crowns from Geoffrey and led his advance company of 12 knights and 100 archers into Edward's awaiting trap in the tower of Calais castle.

== Disgrace ==
Following the failed French siege of the city, Edward transferred governance of Calais to Lord Beauchamp. Amery was allowed to keep the instalment of his bribe he had received from Renti but the king abated his coat of arms in 1350. This rare example of historically attested heraldic abatement was recorded by Sir George Mackenzie: "And Edward the Third of England ordained two of six stars which a gentleman had in his arms to be effaced, because he had sold a seaport of which he was made governor." Pursuivant of arms John Guillim, writing circa 1610, gave the story in considerable detail, adding that Amery's arms were also inverted for his treachery.

Amery soon returned to Italy and went on a pilgrimage to Rome. The fate of his hostaged son, who was carried off into French captivity in the nearby town of Guînes, is not known. In 1352, Charny marched his army to Fretun where it launched a surprise attack during the night of 24–25 July, and the night watch fled. According to Jean Froissart, Amery was found still in bed, with his English mistress. Charny took him to Saint-Omer, where he disbanded his troops. Before they departed, Amery was publicly tortured to death with hot irons and quartered with an axe; his remains were displayed above the town gates. Charny neither garrisoned nor slighted Fretun, to reinforce his view that his argument was a personal one with Amery, which entitled Charny to attack the tower to capture him; and that he had acted with honour in leaving it to be reoccupied by the English.
