= Geoffroi de Charny =

French knight and author

- Geoffroi de Charny from a historiated initial in the manuscript of his works preserved in the Biblioteca Nacional, Madrid (Madrid MS. 9270, fol.98r)
- Born: c. 1306
- Died: 19 September 1356 (aged around 50); Poitiers, France
- Spouses: 1. Jeanne de Toucy (died c.1349); 2. Jeanne de Vergy (died 1428)
- Issue: Geoffroi II de Charny (died 1398)
- Father: Jean de Charny
- Mother: Margaret de Joinville (died c. 1306)

Geoffroi de Charny (c. 1306 – 19 September 1356) was the third son of Jean de Charny, the lord of Charny (then a major Burgundian fortress), and Marguerite de Joinville, daughter of Jean de Joinville, the biographer and close friend of France's King Louis IX. A renowned knight who fought on the French side during the early years of the Hundred Years' War, Charny wrote a semi-autobiographical poem, The Book of Geoffroi de Charny, and a set of questions on chivalric matters for the short-lived Company of the Star, France's counterpart to England's Order of the Garter. Although a prose treatise called the Book of Chivalry has also long been accredited to him, recent findings indicate this to have been more likely by his son of the same name, Geoffroi II de Charny, who died in 1398. Charny is also widely associated with the first known showings of the Shroud of Turin, though there are now doubts that he was responsible for these.

He took part in a successful crusading expedition to Smyrna in 1344 and shortly after his return from this King Philip VI appointed him a royal councillor and bearer of the Oriflamme, the sacred battle-standard of France. This role, one in which he continued under King Jean II, made its holder an automatic target for enemy forces on a battlefield, and it was thus that he met his end during the closing moments of the Battle of Poitiers on 19 September 1356.

Geoffroi de Charny was one of Europe's most admired knights during his lifetime, with a widespread reputation for his skill at arms and his honour. The Tournai-based abbot-chronicler Gilles le Muisit wrote of him: a vigorous soldier, expert in weaponry and much renowned both overseas and here. He has taken part in many wars and in many mortal conflicts, in all of them conducting himself with probity and with nobility'.

== Early career ==
Coat-of-arms of the de Charny family

Because Geoffroi de Charny was a third son, he did not inherit the lordship of Charny, which on the death of his father and his eldest brother Dreux went to Dreux’s daughter Guillemette’s husband Philip de Jonvelle. From the two literary works of which Charny is the certain author, he seems to have needed to earn a living competing in jousts and tourneys at public tournaments, pursuits in which he became expert. When he married his first wife Jeanne de Toucy in 1336 he possessed no fief of his own, hence on the muster lists that record his participations in the early campaigns of the Hundred Years’ War he is repeatedly described as based at the Toucy family fief of Pierre-Perthuis.

In 1342, Charny led a cavalry charge at the Battle of Morlaix in Brittany which foundered due to a cleverly disguised trap laid by the English. Taken captive, Charny was transported to Goodrich Castle in England as the prisoner of Richard Talbot, 2nd Baron Talbot, who according to an English letters patent of October 1343 allowed him to return to France “to find the money for his ransom". Having earlier performed some valuable services for Dauphin Humbert II de Viennois, for which he had been promised revenues from the Dauphiné town of Saint-Marcellin, Charny urgently sought full payment of these, only to be baulked at every turn because of Humbert’s chronic bankruptcy. During the summer of 1344 he rode far to the south of France to confront Humbert face-to-face, but Humbert merely issued further irredeemable money orders, following which, instead of returning home, Charny seems to have boarded a sailing ship bound for the east, a voyage that he very graphically describes in his Book of Geoffroi de Charny poem.

== Crusade ==
The next that Charny is heard of is as a crusader, taking part in the capture of the harbour fortress of Smyrna on 28 October 1344, a papally-sponsored assault by fast galleys which took the defending Turks by surprise. He was one of a very select band of knights led by Edouard de Beaujeu whom Avignon Pope Clement VI, on learning of their efforts from his on-the-spot legate Patriarch Henri d’Asti, specially commended for their bravery. Although there is a common supposition that Charny accompanied the ineffectual crusade to Smyrna led by Dauphin Humbert during the years 1345-7, this supposition derives from a misreading of a passage in the Militia Passionis Jhesu Christi of Philippe de Mézières. In actuality Mézières specifically listed Charny as having been with Beaujeu and other ‘brave knights’ on what is now known to have been the earlier, militarily successful Smyrna crusade of 1344. Furthermore there is reliable contemporary documentation that Charny was already back in France when Humbert’s slow-moving crusade reached Smyrna in the spring of 1346.

== Later career ==
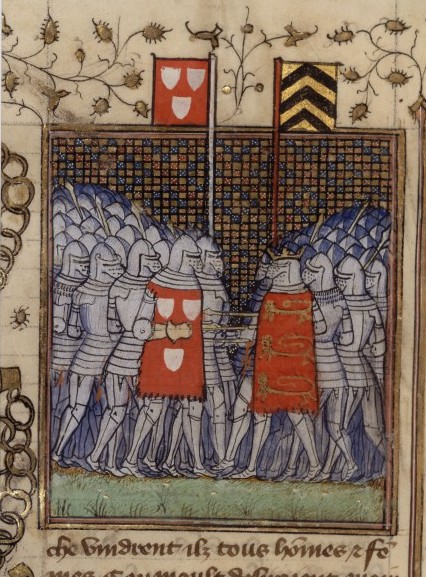
Geoffroi de Charny (left) and King Edward III of England (right) Battle of Calais

Following Charny’s return to France, he joined a siege of the town of Aiguillon in the country’s south-west, from which in August 1346 he was sent posthaste northwards to try to prevent an invading Flemish army from capturing the strategically vital town of Béthune. This assignment he achieved with conspicuous success, in marked contrast to his king, Philip VI, who after being heavily defeated by England’s King Edward III at the battle of Crécy, went on to lose the port of Calais likewise. In 1347 King Philip appointed Charny a royal councilor and bearer of the Oriflamme, later also making him responsible for protecting France’s northern border and for trying to recapture Calais from the English.

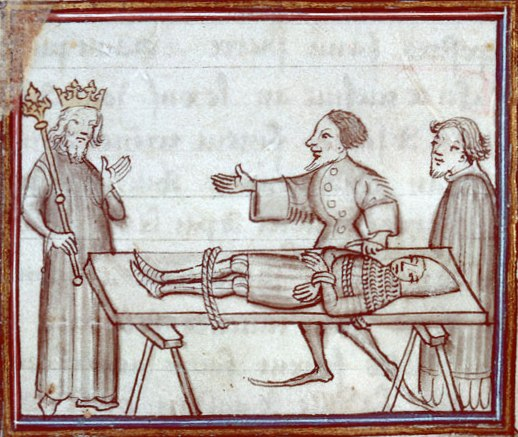
Geoffrey de Charny, wounded and a prisoner of Edward III, after his attempt to take control of Calais (miniature from a manuscript of Fleurs des chroniques, late 14th century)

In 1349 Aimery of Pavia, a Lombard mercenary who held the keys to one of the gates of Calais, secretly offered to help Charny recapture the town in return for payment of a huge bribe. Having procured the requisite sum, Charny led a daring night-time assault only to discover that Aimery had double-crossed him by pre-warning England’s King Edward III. Charny duly found himself once again a prisoner, chafing in an English jail for over a year before the newly succeeded King Jean II paid off the huge ransom that was demanded for his release. Shortly after his return to France Charny found the castle where Aimery was staying, captured him, and carried him off to his military base at Saint-Omer, where he ordered him to be publicly executed as a traitor to the sworn word. As noted by historian Richard Kaeuper: "To show that all this was a private matter and not a part of the business of war (there was currently a truce), Charny took possession only of Aimery himself, not his castle." Because his first wife had died, most likely during the Black Death of 1348/9, without producing a male heir, Charny remarried circa 1354, his second wife being Jeanne de Vergy, a very young woman (for she would live on to 1428), who bore him a son named Geoffroi after his father.

== Death ==
During the spring of 1356, King Jean II and Charny collected the Oriflamme from the abbey of St. Denis and set off with the French army to try to dislodge a well-entrenched enemy garrison that was holding the northern town of Breteuil. Meanwhile an army led by England’s Edward the Black Prince, which had been raiding towns in France’s south, began heading dangerously towards Paris, forcing King Jean and his army to divert to deal with this threat. In mid-September the English and French armies met up near Poitiers, where the commanders of both sides held a remarkable preliminary parley in which Charny participated. Rightly anticipating bloodshed on the scale of what had happened at Crécy ten years earlier, Charny urged that the two sides’ differences might better be resolved via a ‘trial by combat’ with limited numbers rather than by full-scale battle. According to the English herald Sir John Chandos:

...The conference attended by the King of France, Sir John Chandos, and many other prominent people of the period, The King, to prolong the matter and to put off the battle, assembled and brought together all the barons of both sides. Of speech there he (the King) made no stint. There came the Count of Tancarville, and, as the list says, the Archbishop of Sens (Guillaume de Melun) was there, he of Taurus, of great discretion, Charny, Bouciquaut, and Clermont; all these went there for the council of the King of France. On the other side there came gladly the Earl of Warwick, the hoary-headed (white or grey headed) Earl of Suffolk was there, and Bartholomew de Burghersh, most privy to the Prince, and Audeley and Chandos, who at that time were of great repute. There they held their parliament, and each one spoke his mind. But their counsel I cannot relate, yet I know well, in very truth, as I hear in my record, that they could not be agreed, wherefore each one of them began to depart. Then said Geoffroi de Charny: 'Lords,' quoth he, 'since so it is that this treaty pleases you no more, I make offer that we fight you, a hundred against a hundred, choosing each one from his own side; and know well, whichever hundred be discomfited, all the others, know for sure, shall quit this field and let the quarrel be. I think that it will be best so, and that God will be gracious to us if the battle be avoided in which so many valiant men will be slain.

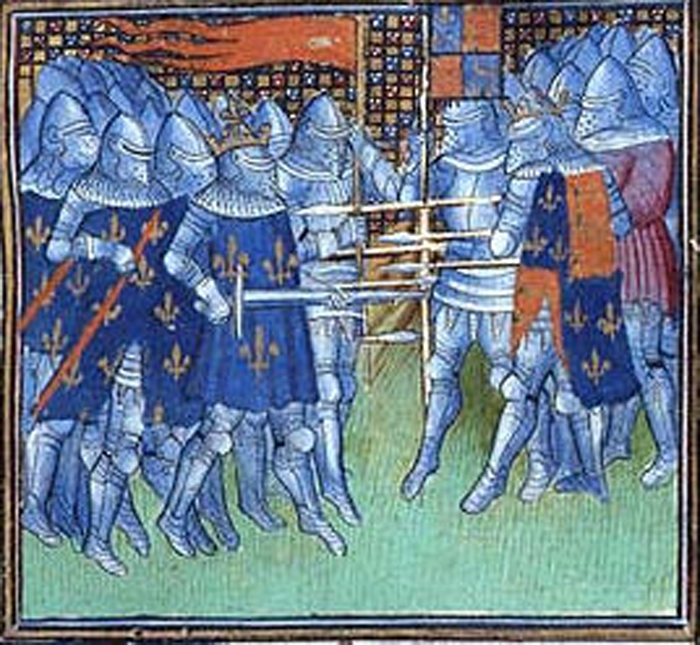
The Battle of Poitiers 1356. The oriflamme carried by Geoffroy de Charny can be seen on the top left.

In the event, due to the French commanders’ over-confidence of victory, Charny’s advice was ignored, and King Jean successively launched all three divisions of his army against Edward the Black Prince’s well-placed English forces in what became known as the battle of Poitiers. The result was an overwhelming defeat for the French. Charny was killed gallantly upholding the Oriflamme to his last breath, and King Jean was obliged to surrender almost immediately after. Following the battle Charny’s body was given a makeshift burial at a nearby Franciscan convent, however in 1370 his remains were exhumed, transported to Paris, and solemnly reburied in the city’s prestigious church of the Celestines. There his hero’s tomb was one of the many casualties of the French Revolution.

== Literary works ==
Three literary works: (1) a Livre Charny poem known as the ‘Book of Geoffroi de Charny’; (2) a set of questions on jousting, tourneys and war; and (3) a lengthy prose Livre de Chevalerie or ‘Book of Chivalry’ are preserved in a handsomely bound manuscript in the Royal Library in Brussels long regarded as the prime authority for Charny’s writings. Although handwriting specialists having dated this manuscript to at least a generation after Charny’s lifetime, leading scholars have understandably assumed Charny to have been the ‘Book of Chivalry’s author.

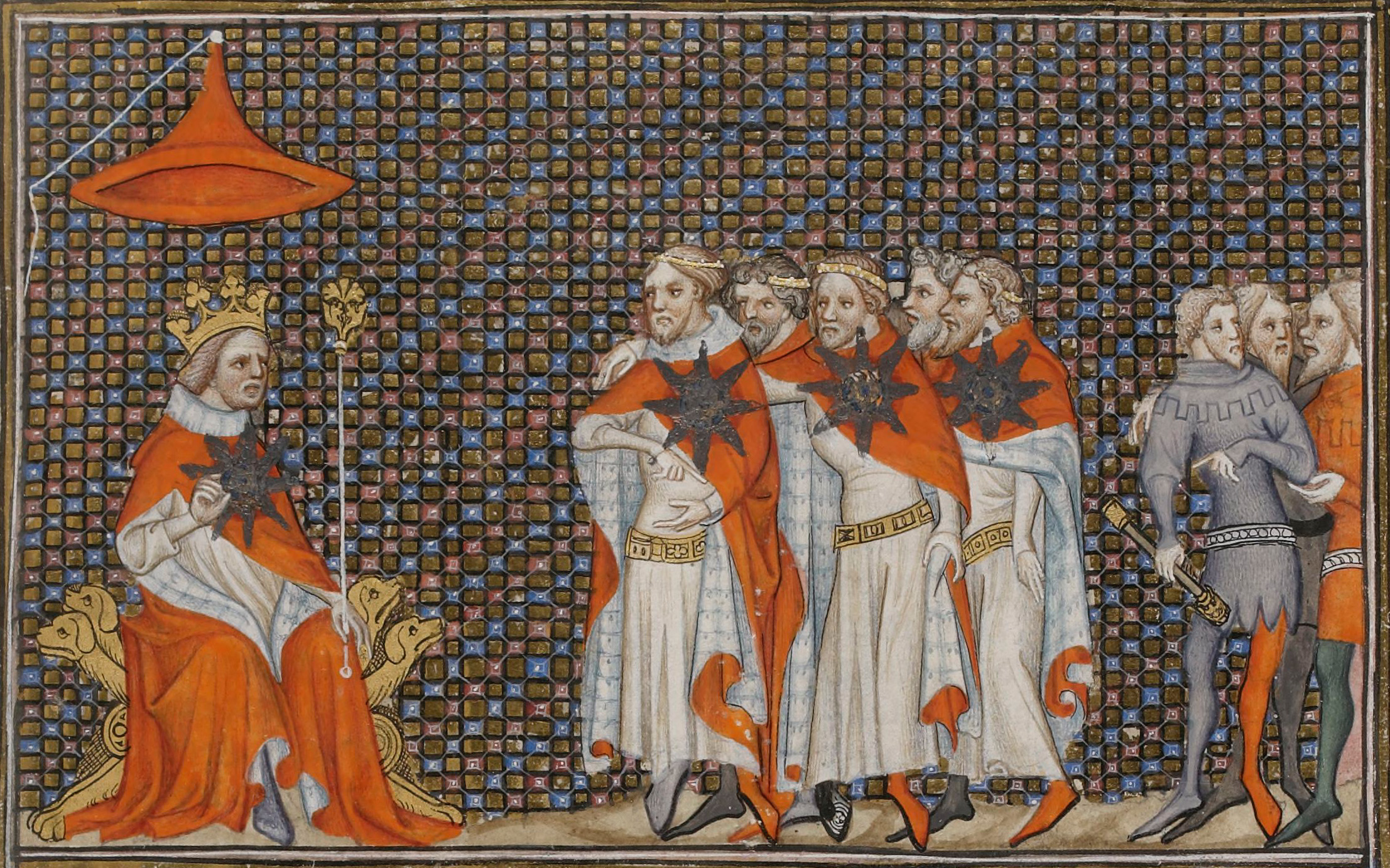
14th-century miniature of the Order of the Star 's founding meeting (Bibliothèque nationale de France, MS français 2813)

Recently, however, this assumption has become seriously challenged by the discovery of two other Charny manuscripts, one in Oxford, the other in Madrid, both self-evidently prepared for practical use by the Company of the Star, the French counterpart to England’s Order of the Garter. Due to King Jean II peremptorily shutting it down, the Company existed for only a single year, 1352, and a similarly abrupt abandonment evident in the Oxford and Madrid manuscripts enables these too to be dated to the same year, thereby within Charny’s lifetime. Whilst both the manuscripts contain the ‘Book of Geoffroi de Charny’ and his set of questions (the latter notably with blank spaces left for the Company’s answers), neither of them has the ‘Book of Chivalry’, an omission now readily explicable thanks to a fine recent translation of the ‘Book of Geoffroi de Charny’ by medieval specialist Nigel Bryant. This never-before-translated poem reveals such subtle yet telling personality and style differences between its author and whoever wrote the ‘Book of Chivalry’ that it now seems highly unlikely that the latter was composed by Charny. More logically, it was the work of his son of the same name, who though a tiny infant at the time of his father’s death, undoubtedly tried to emulate his military and political career, including going on crusade. Via the Brussels manuscript Geoffroi II de Charny arguably sought to honour and preserve his father’s abandoned chivalric works by including them along with his own brand-new ‘Book of Chivalry’.

== Shroud of Turin ==
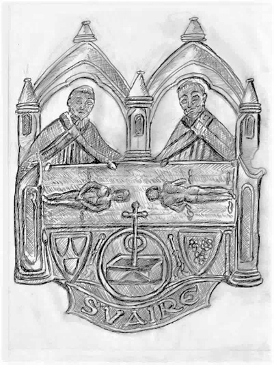
The Shroud pilgrim’s badge found in Paris in the mid-19th century, today preserved in the Cluny Museum Paris. The area from the priests’ head and above, also the SVAIRE label are an artist’s reconstruction.

In 1353, just three years before his death, Geoffroi de Charny had founded a collegiate church at his tiny fief of Lirey near Troyes. Though the tediously lengthy Act of Foundation for this still exists in the local archive office at Troyes, curiously it makes not the slightest mention that he had entrusted Christ’s shroud to the Lirey church. Yet according to a bishop of Troyes writing in 1390 a cloth bearing imprints claimed as authentically from Christ’s crucified body was being displayed there ‘circa’ three years later, i.e. sometime around 1356. Apparently Troyes’ then bishop Henri de Poitiers had investigated these authenticity claims and angrily shut the displays down on finding the purported ‘shroud’ to be a cunning fake concocted by a contemporary artist.

The cloth in question still exists to this day as the controversial ‘Shroud of Turin’ kept in the Cathedral of Turin in Italy. That this cloth is one and the same as the ‘Charny’ shroud is quite evident from a medieval pilgrim badge that was found in the mud of the river Seine during the mid-19th century and is today housed in the Cluny Museum, Paris. Though partly damaged, this badge depicts two clergy holding out a herringbone twill-weave piece of cloth bearing the very same distinctive double imprint of a crucified body as on Turin’s Shroud, with the coats of arms of the Charny and Vergy families immediately below it. Because heraldically Charny’s coat of arms appears in the dexter or superior position in relation to that of his wife Jeanne de Vergy, this has seemed to indicate that Charny was alive and in overall charge whenever the showings were held. Curiously, however, even as late as 28 May 1356, only four months before Charny’s death, the truculent Bishop Henri de Poitiers went on record as formally approving the Lirey church’s foundation, hardly likely had the showings already happened, whilst during the remaining months Charny was away from Lirey on the military maneuvers that culminated in his death.

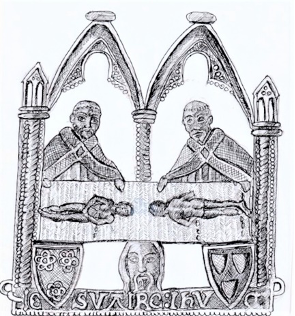
The Shroud pilgrim’s badge that would have been made from the casting mold recently found at Machy near Lirey. The arches, lost in the original, are an artist’s reconstruction. The original mold is currently in a private collection.

There has long seemed to be no explanation for this dichotomy, until 2009 when metal detectorists exploring a field in Machy, the next-door village to Lirey, turned up a casting mold for a Shroud pilgrim badge which although partly damaged is clearly of a type similar to that found in Paris, yet with certain very significant differences. Although the Shroud is again depicted accompanied by the Charny and Vergy coats of arms, the shields’ positioning is reversed, that of Jeanne de Vergy’ now being in the dexter, or ‘in charge’ position, with Charny’s subordinate to this. And whereas a banner-like label that was once on the Paris badge has long been almost completely lost due to the damage, on the Machy badge its straight-line inscription is intact, reading ’SVAIRE IhV’, ‘Shroud of Jesus’. Clear from this is that it was created for the authenticity-claiming showings that had so enraged Bishop Henri de Poitiers, and it was Charny’s very young wife Jeanne de Vergy who had been in overall charge of these. Whatever the circumstances that had prompted the showings, they had evidently been held shortly after Charny’s 1356 death rather than before it. As for the pilgrim badge found in Paris, in the light of certain styling characteristics, notably its banner-type inscription (which probably read simply ‘SVAIRE’, as appears on some later pilgrim badges featuring banner-borne inscriptions), this was most likely commissioned by Charny’s son Geoffroi II de Charny for showings that he is known to have held in 1389, apparently incorporating his mother Jeanne de Vergy as his co-sponsor.

Yet this does not necessarily contradict the commonly held supposition that Charny was the Shroud’s first historically certain owner. Both his son Geoffroi II, and his grand-daughter Marguerite would later attest quite independently of each other that it was he who had acquired it. Whatever may have been the true story behind the Shroud’s acquisition, evidently during his lifetime Charny chose not to say anything about this, nor even publicly disclose its existence, let alone try to profit from it.

== In literature ==
Geoffroi de Chargny is a main character in The Road to Poitiers by Jonathan Lunn.
