= Nobility of the First French Empire =

Titles of nobility created by Napoleon I

Imperial coat of arms

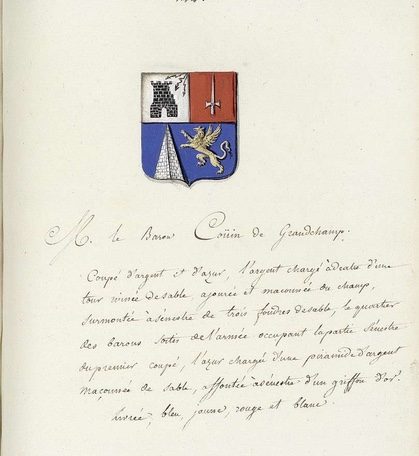
Arms granted to Joseph Christophe Couin, made a baron de Granchamp et de l'Empire in 1808

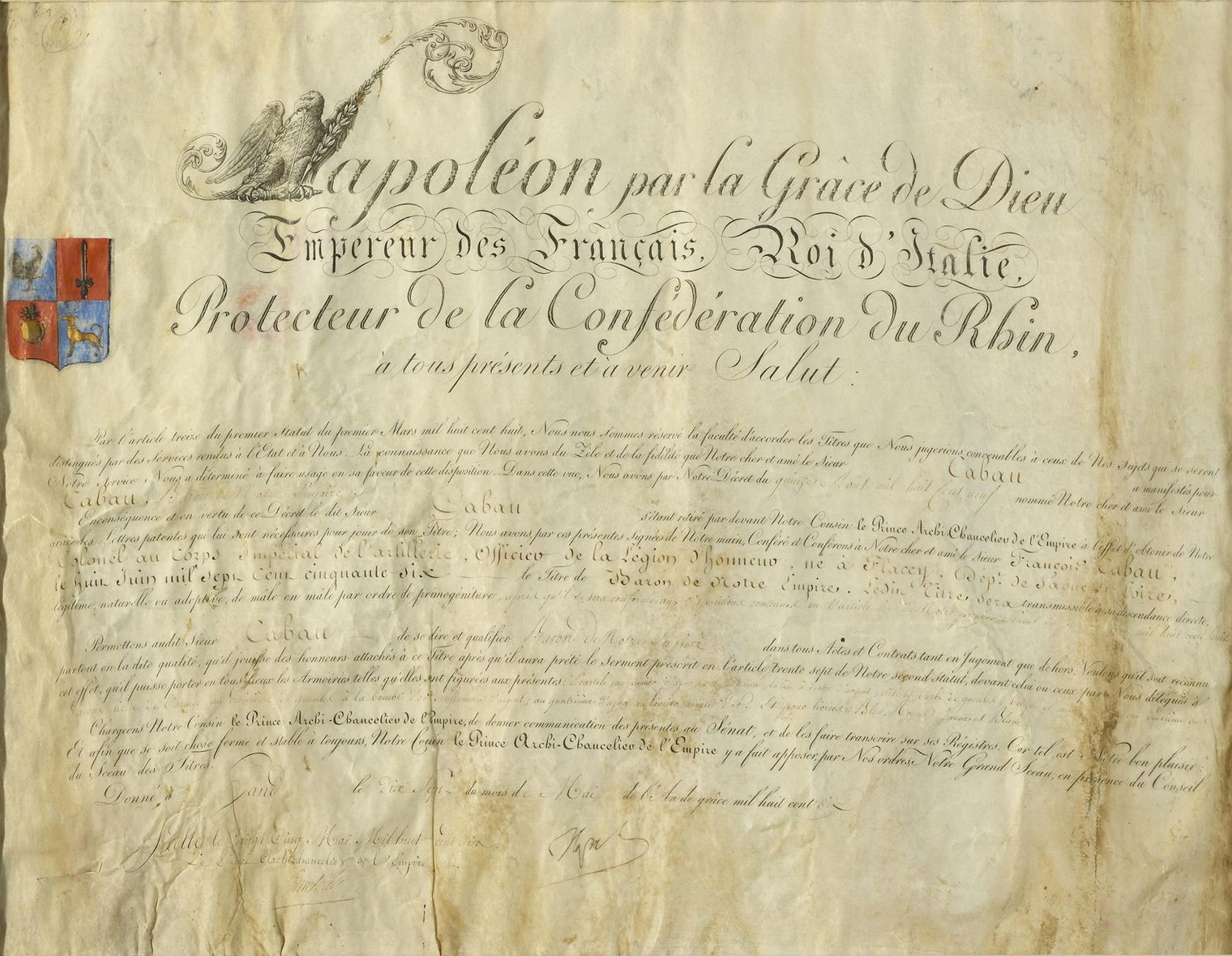
Patent of nobility granted to artillery colonel François Cabau, who became baron de l'Empire in 1810

As Emperor of the French, Napoleon I created titles in a newly established noblesse impériale (imperial nobility) to institute a stable elite in the First French Empire, after the instability resulting from the French Revolution.

Like many others, both before and since, Napoleon found that the ability to confer titles was also a useful tool of patronage which cost the state little. In all, about 2,200 titles were created by Napoleon:

- Princes and dukes:
  - Princes of the imperial family
    - The Prince Imperial (Napoleon's son and heir apparent, who was later styled as Napoleon II)
    - Princes of France (8 close family members)
  - Sovereign princes (3)
  - Dukes of large fiefs (20)
  - Victory princes (4)
  - Victory dukedoms (10)
  - Other dukedoms (3)
- Counts (251)
- Barons (1,516)
- Knights (385)

Napoleon also established a new knightly order in 1802, the Legion of Honour, which is still in existence today. The Grand Dignitaries of the French Empire ranked, regardless of noble title, immediately behind the Princes of France.

== Creation ==
Ennoblement started in 1804 with the creation of princely titles for members of Napoleon's family, the House of Bonaparte. Other titles followed: titles were created and, in 1808, those of count, baron, and knight.

Napoleon founded the concept of "nobility of Empire" by an imperial decree on 1 March 1808. The purpose of this creation was to amalgamate the old nobility and the revolutionary middle-class in one peerage system. This step, which aimed at the introduction of a stable elite, was fully in line with the creation of the Legion of Honour and of life senatorial peerages.

A council of the seals and titles was also created and charged with establishing armorial bearings, and had a monopoly of this new nobility.

These creations are to be distinguished from an order such as the Order of the Bath. These titles of nobility did not have any true privileges, with two exceptions:

- the right to have armorial bearings;
- the lands granted with the title were held in a majorat, transmitted jointly with the title.

== Hierarchy ==
In Napoleon's nobility, there existed a strict and precise hierarchy of the titles, which granted office to some according to their membership of the imperial family, their rank in the army, or their administrative career in the civil or clerical administrations:

- Prince: for members of the imperial family, certain principal leaders of the Empire (Charles Maurice de Talleyrand was a prince of Bénévent), and some Marshals of the Empire
- Duke: (duc) for principal dignitaries and Marshals of the Empire
- Count: (comte) for ministers, senators, archbishops, councilors of State, the president of the Corps législatif, and some generals
- Baron: chairmen of the Court of Auditors, bishops, mayors of 37 good cities, bankers, and some generals
- Knight: (chevalier) other functions

One could receive a title without exercising one of its enumerated functions. The title of marquis was not used during the First Empire, and it therefore became very fashionable after the Bourbon Restoration, since it was not perceived to be tainted by the Napoleonic creations.

This nobility is essentially a "nobility of service", to a large extent made up of soldiers (67.9%), some civil servants (22%), and some collaborating members of the ancien régime. Napoleon's nobility was not abolished after the Bourbon Restoration, but it largely disappeared gradually for natural reasons, due in part to the great number of soldiers who had been promoted and subsequently died during the Napoleonic Wars.

In 1975, there were 239 remaining families belonging to the First Empire's nobility. Of those, perhaps about 135 were titled. Only one princely title (Essling, since Sievers is no longer used and Pontecorvo is merged with Prince Murat) and seven ducal titles remain today.

== Heraldry ==
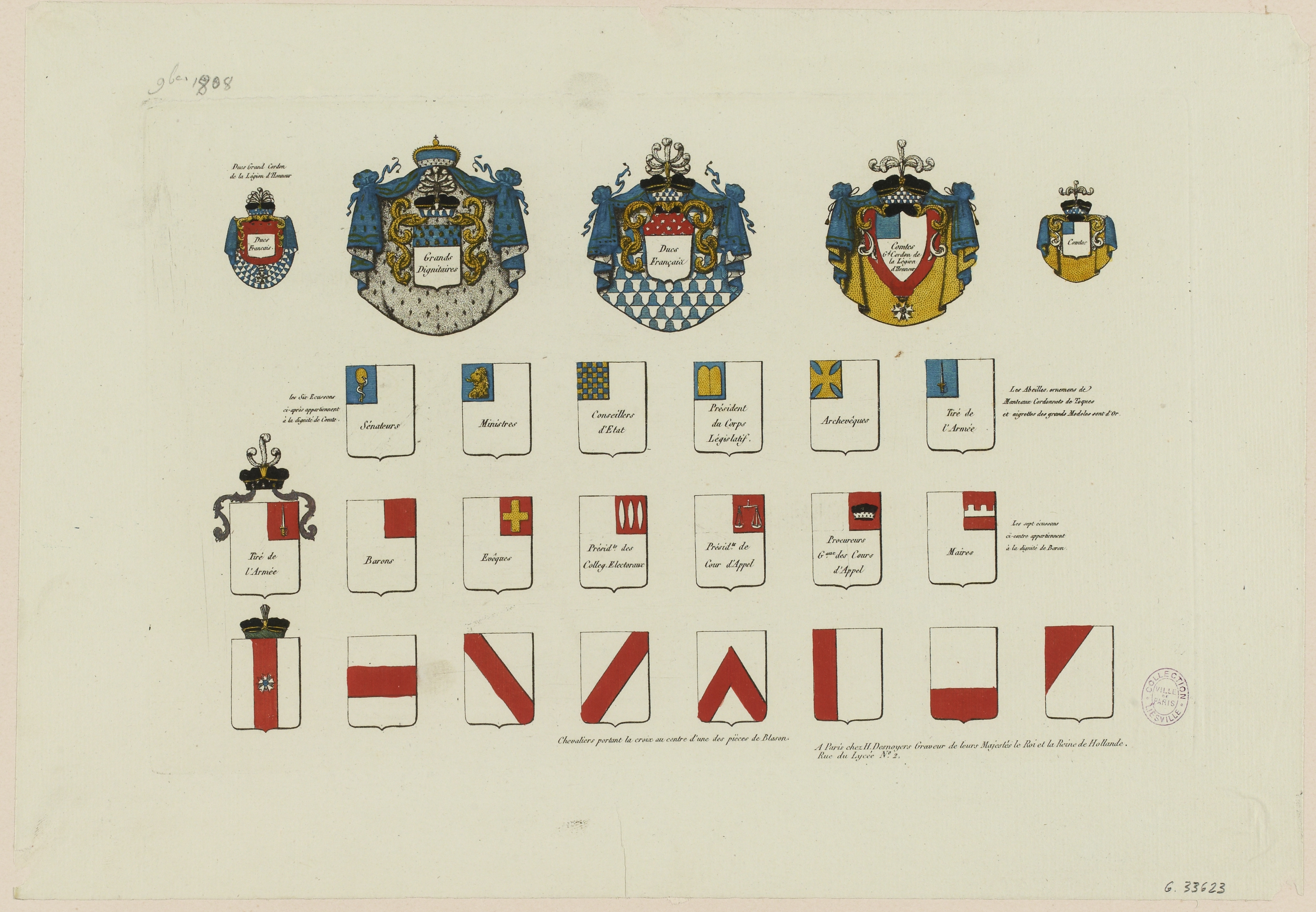
Explanation of the various marks on the shields indicating rank or function.

Along with a new system of titles of nobility, the First French Empire also introduced a new system of heraldry.

Napoleonic heraldry was based on traditional heraldry but was characterised by a stronger sense of hierarchy. It employed a rigid system of additional marks in the shield to indicate official functions and positions. Another notable difference from traditional heraldry was the toques, which replaced coronets. The toques were surmounted by ostrich feathers: dukes had 7, counts had 5, barons had 3, and knights had 1. The number of lambrequins was also regulated: 3, 2, 1 and none respectively. As many grantees were self-made men, and the arms often alluded to their life or specific actions, many new or unusual charges were also introduced.

The most characteristic mark of Napoleonic heraldry was the additional marks in the shield to indicate official functions and positions. These came in the form of quarters in various colours, and would be differenced further by marks of the specific rank or function. In this system, the arms of knights had an ordinary gules, charged with the emblem of the Legion of Honour; barons a quarter gules in chief sinister, charged with marks of the specific rank or function; counts a quarter azure in chief dexter, charged with marks of the specific rank or function; and dukes had a chief gules semé of stars argent.

The said 'marks of the specific rank or function' as used by barons and counts depended on the rank or function held by the individual. Military barons and counts had a sword on their quarter, members of the Conseil d'Etat had a chequy, ministers had a lion's head, prefects had a wall beneath an oak branch, mayors had a wall, landowners had a wheat stalk, judges had a balance, members of academies had a palm, etc.

A decree of 3 March 1810 stated: "The name, arms and livery shall pass from the father to all sons" although the distinctive marks of title could only pass to the son who inherited it. This provision applied only to the bearers of Napoleonic titles.

The Napoleonic system of heraldry did not outlast the First French Empire. The Second French Empire (1852–1870) made no effort to revive it, although the official arms of France were again those of Napoleon I.

== Titles ==
=== Princes ===
There were three types of princely titles:

- the princes impériaux or Imperial Princes (members of the imperial family):
  - the prince impérial or the Prince Imperial, the future 'Napoleon II' (1811-1832; Napoleon's son)
  - the princes français or French Princes:
    - Joseph Bonaparte (from 1804), Napoleon's older brother, hereditary in the male and female grandchildren line
    - Louis Bonaparte (from 1804), Napoleon's younger brother
    - Joachim Murat (from 1804), Napoleon's brother-in-law
    - Eugène de Beauharnais (from 1805), Napoleon's stepson and adopted son
    - Elisa Bonaparte (from 1806), Napoleon's younger sister
    - Jérôme Bonaparte (from 1806), Napoleon's younger brother
    - Stéphanie de Beauharnais (from 1806), Napoleon's adopted daughter, first cousin once removed of his wife's first husband and second cousin of his stepchildren
    - Joseph Fesch (from 1807), Napoleon's half-uncle
    - Lucien Bonaparte (from 1815), Napoleon's younger brother
      - Marie Antoinette Murat, Napoleon's younger sister niece-in-law, niece of his brother-in-law, is sometimes mentioned as Princesse Murat from 1808
- the princes souverains or Sovereign Princes (who had received a vassal principality of the Empire):
  - Charles Maurice de Talleyrand-Périgord, Prince de Bénévent, 1806–1815
  - Louis-Alexandre Berthier, Prince de Neuchâtel et Valangin, 1806–1814
  - Jean-Baptiste Bernadotte, Prince de Pontecorvo, 1806–1810
  - Lucien Murat, Prince de Pontecorvo, 1812–1815
  - Three other titles fall into this category but are not as clear cut as the others:
    - Pauline Bonaparte was granted the Principality of Guastalla, with title of Princesse et Duchesse de Guastalla, but held it for less than five months (from 30 March to 14 August 1806) before its cession back to the Kingdom of Italy
    - Eugène de Beauharnais received the honorary title of Prince de Venise, 1806
    - Jean Lannes, Prince de Sievers (honorary title on a non-sovereign fief's donation), 1807
- the titres de victoire or titles of victory, granted after exploits and having only an honorary role (in most cases awarded as a 'promotion' to holders of ducal victory titles):
  - Louis-Nicolas Davout, Prince d'Eckmühl, 1809 (extinct in 1853), for the Battle of Eckmühl
  - Louis-Alexandre Berthier, Prince de Wagram, 1809 (extinct in 1918), for the Battle of Wagram
  - André Masséna, Prince d'Essling, 1810 (extant), for the Battle of Essling
  - Michel Ney, Prince de la Moskowa, 1813 (extinct in 1969), for the Battle of Moscow (Borodino)

=== Dukes ===
There were three types of ducal titles:

- the duchés grands-fiefs or dukes of large fiefs outside the territory of the First French Empire (but with no rights of sovereignty):
  - Jean-Toussaint Arrighi de Casanova, Duc de Padoue, 1808 (extinct in 1888)
  - Jean-Baptiste Bessières, Duc d'Istrie, 1809 (extinct in 1856)
  - Jean-Jacques-Régis de Cambacérès, Duc de Parme, 1808 (extinct in 1824)
  - Armand-Augustin-Louis de Caulaincourt, Duc de Vicence, 1808 (extinct in 1896)
  - Henri Jacques Guillaume Clarke, Duc de Feltre, 1809 (extinct in 1818), also Comte d'Hunebourg
  - Géraud Duroc, Duc de Frioul, 1808 (extinct in 1829)
  - Joseph Fouché, Duc d'Otrante, 1808 (extant)
  - Martin-Michel-Charles Gaudin, Duc de Gaëte, 1809 (extinct in 1841)
  - Charles-François Lebrun, Duc de Plaisance, 1808 (extinct in 1927)
  - Étienne Macdonald, Duc de Tarente, 1809 (extinct in 1912)
  - Hugues-Bernard Maret, Duc de Bassano, 1809 (extinct in 1906)
  - Bon-Adrien Jeannot de Moncey, Duc de Conegliano, 1808 (extinct in 1842)
  - Édouard Mortier, Duc de Trévise, 1808 (extinct in 1912)
  - Jean-Baptiste Nompère de Champagny, Duc de Cadore, 1809 (extinct in 1893)
  - Nicolas Oudinot, Duc de Reggio, 1810 (extinct in 1956)
  - Claude Ambroise Régnier, Duc de Massa, 1809 (extinct in 1814)
  - Anne Jean Marie René Savary, Duc de Rovigo (extinct in 1872)
  - Jean-de-Dieu Soult, Duc de Dalmatie, 1808 (extinct in 1857)
  - Claude-Victor Perrin, Duc de Belluno, 1808 (extinct in 1853)
- the titres de victoires or victory titles, comparable to the princely titles of the same category:
  - François Joseph Lefebvre, Duc de Dantzig, 28 May 1807 (extinct in 1820); Dantzig was then still a city republic, which became part of Prussia after Napoleon's defeat, and is now Gdańsk in Poland, for the Battle of Dantzig
  - Michel Ney, Duc d'Elchingen, 1808 (extinct in 1969), for the Battle of Elchingen
  - Jean-Andoche Junot, Duc d'Abrantès, 1808 (extinct in 1859, but extended in female line in 1869; extinct again in 1982), for the Battle of Abrantes
  - Louis-Nicolas Davout, Duc d'Auerstaedt, 1808 (extinct in 1853, but extended to collaterals; extant), for the Battle of Auerstaedt
  - Charles-Pierre Augereau, Duc de Castiglione, 1808 (extinct in 1816), for the Battle of Castiglione
  - Jean Lannes, Duc de Montebello, 1808 (extant), for the Battle of Montebello
  - Auguste de Marmont, Duc de Raguse, 1808 (extinct in 1852); present-day Dubrovnik on the Croatian coast, which Republic of Ragusa was conquered as part of Napoleon's own Italian kingdom, and later became part of the Illyrian Provinces, for the Battle of Ragusa
  - André Masséna, Duc de Rivoli, 1808 (extant), for the Battle of Rivoli
  - François Christophe de Kellermann, Duc de Valmy, 1808 (extinct in 1868), for the Battle of Valmy
  - Louis-Gabriel Suchet, Duc d'Albufera, 1813 (extant), for the Battle of Albufera
  - Jean-Baptiste Girard, Duc de Ligny, 1815, not recognised by the Bourbon Restoration (extinct in 1815), for the Battle of Ligny
- the ordinary titles, which went before the name:
  - Empress Joséphine, Duchesse de Navarre, 1810, ducal title inherited by her grandsons (extinct in 1852)
  - Emmerich Joseph de Dalberg, Duc de Dalberg, 1810 (extinct in 1833)
  - Denis Decrès, Duc Decrés, 1813 (extinct in 1820)

For a ducal title to be hereditary, it was necessary for the holder to have at least a 200,000 francs in annual income and that the land which generated the income be held in a majorat for the inheritor of the dukedom.

These titles were allotted only to Marshals of the Empire and to certain ministers.

=== Counts ===
The ordinary title of count (comte de l'Empire) always went in front of the name. It was subject to the same rules as the title of duke but with an income threshold of only 30,000 francs.

Senators, ministers, and archbishops were all counts. From 1808 to 1814, 388 titles were created.

=== Barons ===
The title of baron (baron de l'Empire) was comparable with that of count, except that the income threshold fell to 15,000 francs.

Mayors of large cities and bishops were all barons. Between 1808 and 1814, 1,090 titles of baron were created.

Today, the title of baron of the First French Empire is still claimed by families including d'Allemagne, Ameil, d'Andlau, d'Astorg, Auvray, Caffarelli, Christophe, Daru, Dein, Dubois, Eblé, Evain, Fabvier, Fain, Géloes, Gourgaud, Guerrier de Dumast, Hamelin, Hottinguer, Laffitte, Lefebvre, Lepic, Méquet, Mallet, Marbot, Martin de Lagarde, Massias, Menu de Ménil, Nérin, Nicolas, Parmentier, Petiet, Pinoteau, Pontalba, Portalis, Rey, Rippert, Roederer, de Saint-Didier, de Saint-Geniès, de Saizieu, Salmon, Saluces, Seillère, Skarżyński de Bończa, Strolz, Testot-Ferry, Thiry, de Villeneuve, and Werlein.

=== Knights ===
The title of knight (chevalier de l'Empire) also went in front of the name. There was an obligation to have an income of at least 3,000 francs, and a majorat on the land generating the income was not obligatory.

All knights, officers, commanders, grand-officers and grand-crosses of the Legion of Honour received the title of chevalier de l'Empire (Knight of the Empire), but there had to be three generations of successive knights for the title to become hereditary. Between 1808 and 1814, 1,600 titles of knight were created.

== See also ==
- French nobility
