= Werlein =

Werlein is a German language surname and a variant of Werle. Notable people with the name include:

- Betty Werlein Carter (1910–2000), American publisher, editor and writer
- Elizebeth Thomas Werlein (1883–1946), Historical preservationist
- Ewing Werlein Jr. (1936), American judge
- P. P. Werlein (1812–1885), American music publisher, piano dealer, and musical instrument retailer based in New Orleans
- Sarah Günther-Werlein (1983), German former footballer
