= Auvray =

Auvray is a French surname. Notable people with the surname include:

- Félix Auvray (1800–1833), French painter
- Jean-Claude Auvray, French opera director
- Kaïlé Auvray (born 2004), professional footballer
- Louis Auvray (1810–1890), French sculptor and art critic
- Lydie Auvray (born 1956), French accordionist, composer and singer
- Stéphane Auvray (born 1981), Guadeloupean footballer
