= Orle (heraldry) =

Heraldic ordinary

Argent, an orle gules

In heraldry, an orle is a subordinary consisting of a narrow band occupying the inward half of where a bordure would be, following the exact outline of the shield but within it, showing the field between the outer edge of the orle and the edge of the shield.

An orle can sometimes be confused with an inescutcheon or escutcheon voided (a smaller shield with a shield-shaped hole), or with a patch of the field left over between a bordure and an inescutcheon.

Orles may varied by any of the lines of variation.

Discrete charges arranged in the position of an orle are described as in orle or as "an orle of".

Gules, an inescutcheon argent within a bordure argent

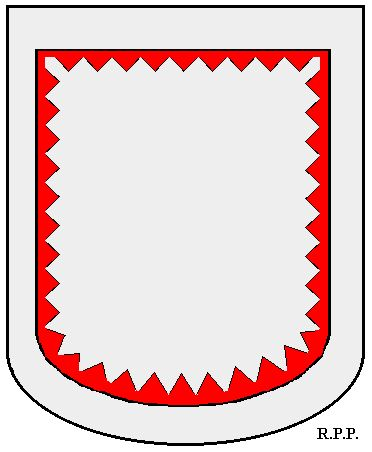
An orle Gules indented on its inner edge

Argent, eight torteaux (roundels gules) in orle; alternatively an orle of eight torteaux

The arms of Dervorguilla of Galloway and her husband John de Balliol; the latter's orle is dimidiated

== Tressure ==
A tressure is a subordinary that can be regarded as a diminutive of an orle. John Woodward is of the opinion that "a plain tressure is a diminutive of the orle, and is depicted half its thickness". A tressure is described as representing the circular raised line on a coin that shows the user if the coin has been clipped or overly worn. A double tressure is normally an 'orle gemel', i.e. an orle divided into two narrow ones set closely together, one inside the other, with artists interpreting it as composed of two narrow orles each being one-third or one-fourth the width and the void between them being one-third or one-half the width. A. C. Fox-Davies argued that a tressure is by necessity doubled, otherwise it would be an orle. However, examples exist of coats of arms with a single tressure, as in the arms of Edward Lawrence.

Example of a double tressure: Argent a double tressure Gules

Example of a double tressure flory-counter-flory: Argent a double tressure flory-counter-flory Gules

Arms of the Marquess of Aberdeen and Temair, double tressure flowered and counter-flowered interchangeably with thistles, roses, and fleurs-de-lys

Plain tressures are rare. It is much more common to see tressures flory-counter-flory, especially in Scottish heraldry, where many coats of arms derive from the Royal Coat of Arms, in which the tressure represents the Auld Alliance with France (fleurs-de-lys being a French symbol). As a result the double tressure flory-counter-flory is often referred to as 'the royal tressure'.

When a tressure is impaled, it is supposed to follow the same rule as the bordure, and not to be continued on the side of the impalement, but several exceptions may be found.

Example of quartered arms (Bowes-Lyon) with tressures in two of the quarters: Quarterly 1 and 4 argent a lion rampant azure, armed and langued gules within a double tressure flory counter-flory of the second (for Lyon); 2 and 3 ermine three bows stringed palewise in fess proper (for Bowes).

Royal coat of arms of Scotland with a double-tressure flory-counter-flory

Example of the arms of the Montbeliard of Montfaucon family, showing two barbels within a plain double-tressure

Example of a double tressure impaled, the arms of Isabella of Scotland

== Sources ==
- A C Fox-Davies, A Complete Guide to Heraldry (revised by J P Brooke-Little, Richmond Herald), Thomas Nelson and Sons, London 1969
