= Jean-Claude Auvray =

French opera director

Jean-Claude Auvray is a French opera director. In 1973 he was appointed by Rolf Libermann to direct the Paris Opera in their productions of Puccini's Tosca (Puccini) and Mozart's Così fan tutte. Le Nozze di Figaro was acclaimed in 1974. Among his 150 and more productions are Tancredi (Rossini), La Gioconda (Ponchielli), Tristan und Isolde (Wagner), Manon (Massenet), Peter Grimes (Britten), Fidelio (Beethoven), Otello, Aida (Verdi), La bohème and Gianni Schicchi (Puccini). Between 1996 and 2006 he directed plays at the Israeli Opera.
