= Rippert =

Rippert is a surname. Notable people with the surname include:

- Guillaume Rippert (born 1985), French footballer
- Hans-Rolf Rippert, better known as Ivan Rebroff (1931–2008), German singer
- Ulrich Rippert (born 1951), German politician of Trotskyism

== See also ==
- Eric Ripert (born 1965), French chef in New York
