= Ordinary (heraldry) =

Basic geometric charge in heraldry

In heraldry, an ordinary is one of the two main types of charges, beside the mobile charges. An ordinary is a simple geometrical figure, bounded by straight lines and running from side to side or top to bottom of the shield. There are also some geometric charges known as subordinaries, which have been given lesser status by some heraldic writers, though most have been in use as long as the traditional ordinaries. Diminutives of ordinaries and some subordinaries are charges of the same shape, though thinner. Most of the ordinaries are theoretically said to occupy one-third of the shield; but this is rarely observed in practice, except when the ordinary is the only charge (as in the coat of arms of Austria).

The terms ordinary and subordinary are somewhat controversial, as they have been applied arbitrarily and inconsistently among authors, and the use of these terms has been disparaged by some leading heraldic authorities. In his Complete Guide to Heraldry (1909), Arthur Charles Fox-Davies asserted that the terms are likely inventions of heraldic writers and not of heralds, arguing the "utter absurdity of the necessity for any [such] classification at all," and stating that the ordinaries and sub-ordinaries are, in his mind, "no more than first charges."

== Types ==
=== Ordinaries ===
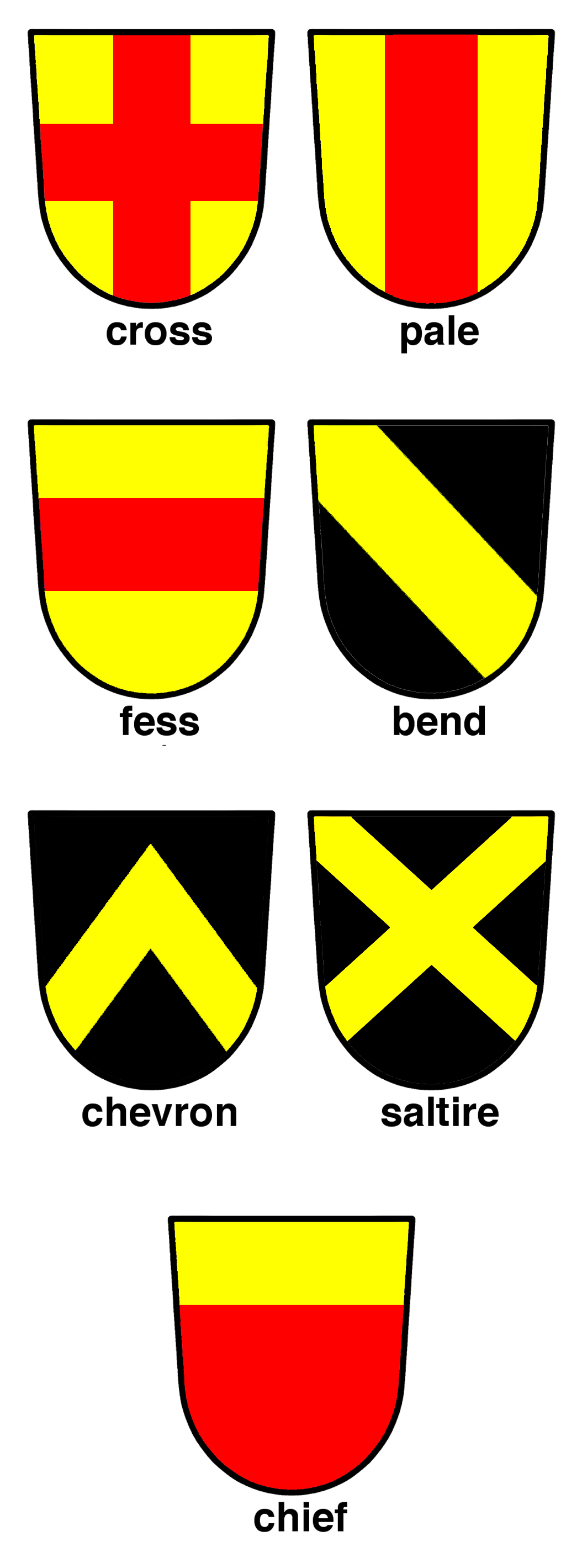
Ordinaries

Ordinaries (sometimes called "honourable ordinaries") resemble partitions of the field, but are formally considered objects on the field. Though there is some debate as to exactly which geometrical charges—with straight edges and running from edge to edge of the shield—constitute ordinaries, certain ones are agreed on by everyone. Except for the chief they are central to the shield. Ordinaries should not be mixed with Division of the field.

- Cross: a pale and a fess of equal widths conjoined (though the cross is typically thinner than this would suggest), as in the arms of the City of London.
- Pale: a vertical stripe right down the middle of the shield. Typically 1/5 to 1/3 the width of the field.
  - A variant is the Canadian pale, invented in 1964 for the new Canadian national flag: it takes up half the width of the field.
- Fess: a horizontal stripe, as in the coat of arms of Austria. Typically 1/5 to 1/3 the height of the field.
  - Bar: a narrower fess (said in theory to occupy one-fifth of the field), sometimes reckoned as an ordinary in its own right. It is rarely borne singly.
- Bend: an oblique band from the dexter chief (the bearer's upper right, viewer's upper left) to the opposite corner, as in the arms of the former grand duchy of Baden.
- Bend sinister: a bend in the opposite direction (sinister chief to dexter base).
- Chevron: two diagonal bands meeting in the centre in the form of an inverted V, or like the beams of a gable; as in the arms of Udine, Italy, or Trans, Switzerland.
- Saltire: a bend and a bend sinister both of equal widths conjoined to form a diagonal cross (×), as in the Scots national banner (often referred to simply as "the Saltire"), and also known colloquially as a St Andrew's cross.
- Chief: a horizontal band right across the top of the shield, as in the arms of the district of Lausanne (Vaud, Switzerland).
  - Chief triangular begins in the corners and extends to a point that is one quarter to one third the way down the shield. It is a complex line division variant of a chief.
  - Chief enarched is drawn with a concave arch
  - Chief double-arched has two concavities
- Terrace in base (French: champagne, terrace; Italian campagna; German Schildfuß)
  - Mount when represented in green and curved or arched, as a hill.
  - Mount mounted, or Shapournet shapourned: a trimount.

=== Ordinaries or subordinaries ===
The following are sometimes classed as ordinaries, sometimes as subordinaries (see below):

- Bordure: the boundary of the shield; often used for cadency
- Pile: downward pointing triangle, issuing from the top of the shield
- Pall or Pairle: a Y-shape
  - A variant is the shakefork: a pall cut short of the margins, with pointed ends. It is frequent in Scotland, owing to its prominence in the armoury of Clan Cunningham.
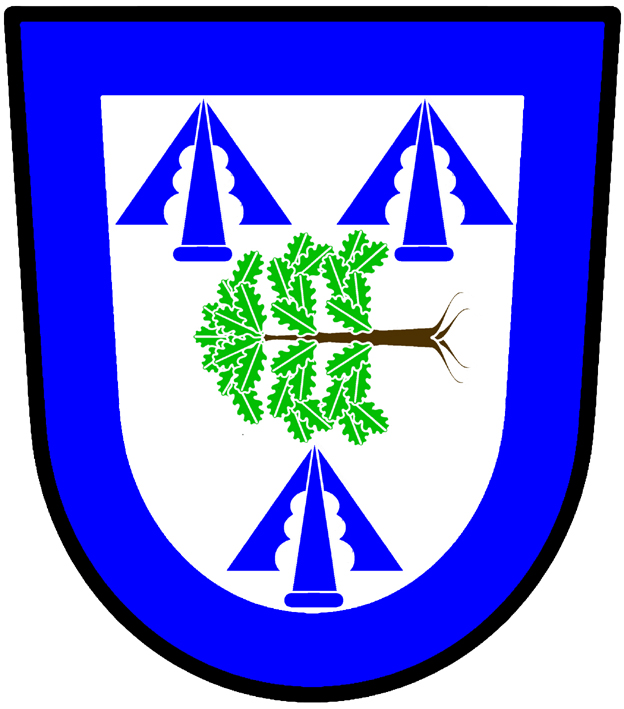
a bordure—Argent; an oak tree eradicated, fessways, proper, between three pheons, points upward, azure; within a bordure azure—Dalgleish of Keavil, Scotland

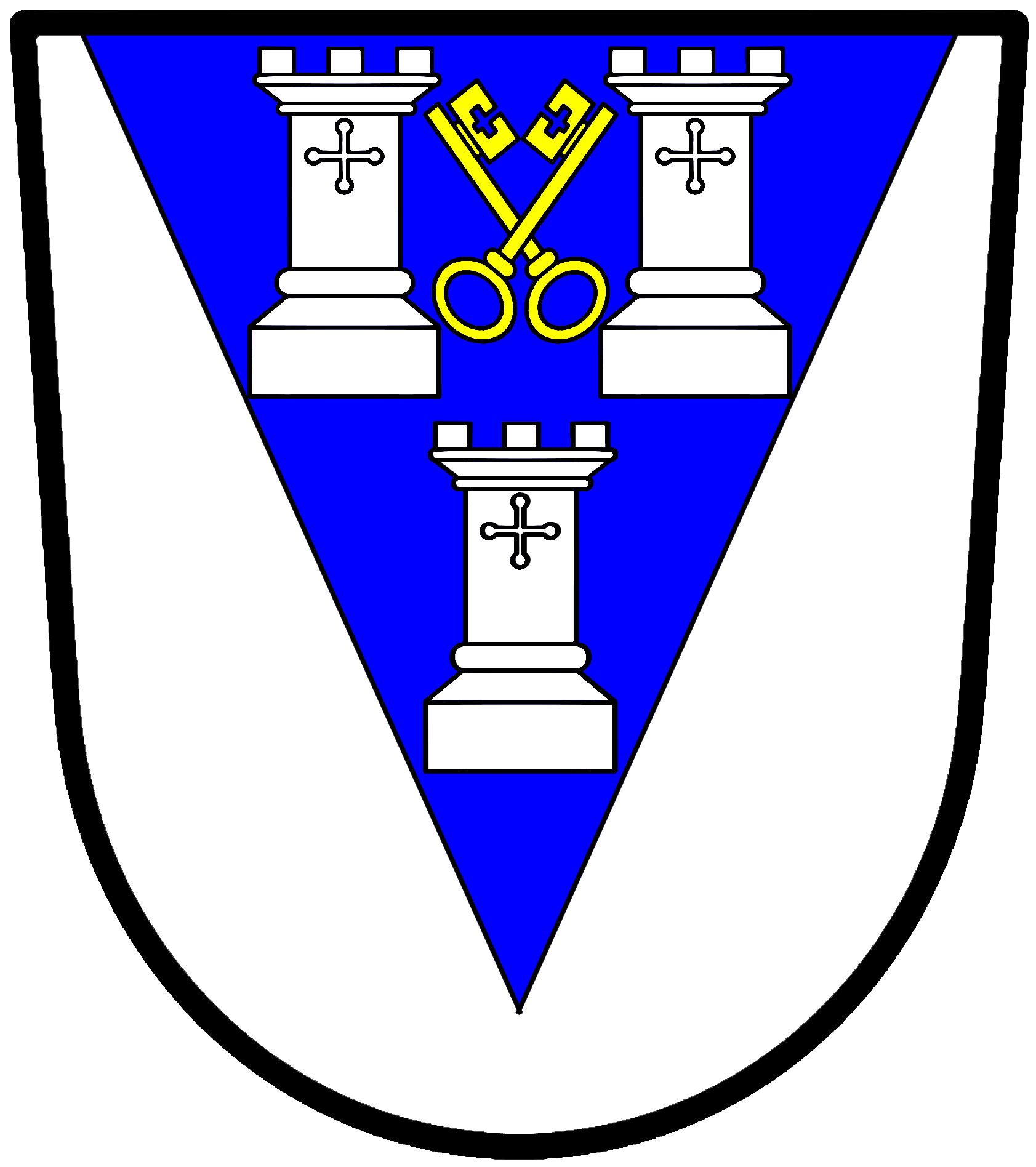
a pile—Argent, on a pile azure three towers, two and one, of the first, in the middle chief point two keys in saltire, wards upwards and inwards, or—Otley Urban District Council, England

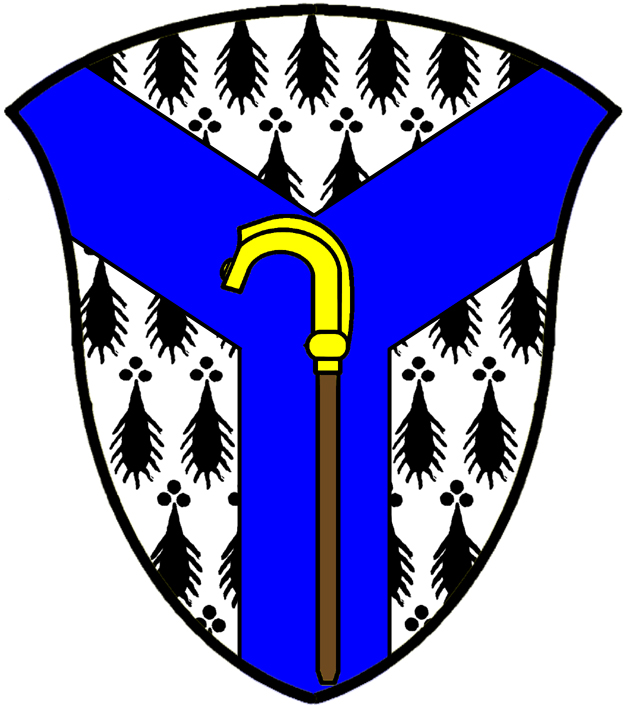
a pairle or pall—Ermine; a pairle azure charged with the crosier of St Fillan proper—Dewar, Canada* (Scots coat)

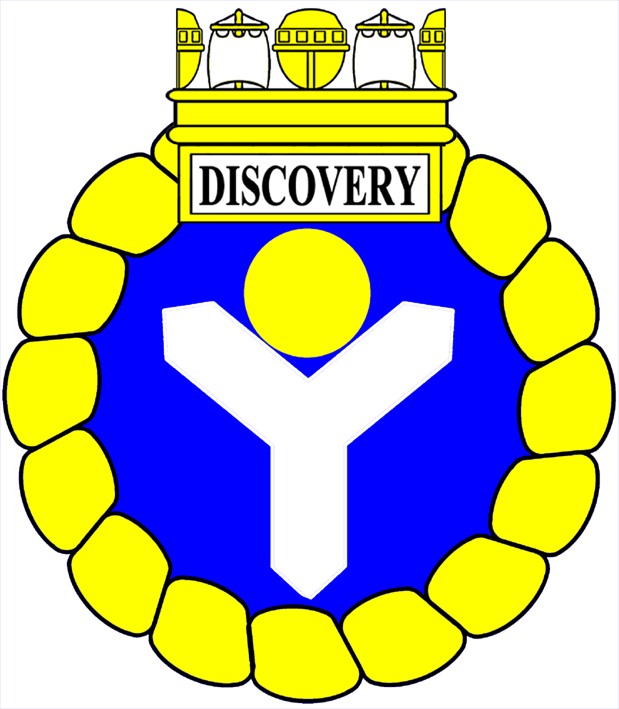
a shakefork—Azure, a shakefork argent supporting in the middle chief a bezant, within an annulet enwreathed, ensigned of a naval crown or, the sails argent, beneath which on a panel argent edged or is the name "Discovery" in letters sable—HM Canadian Ship Discovery

=== Subordinaries ===
Some geometric figures are not considered to be "honourable ordinaries" and are called "subordinaries". Very loosely, they are geometric or conventional charges that, unlike ordinaries, do not stretch from edge to edge of the shield. There is no definitive list or definition, but they generally include:

==== Fixed subordinaries ====
Fixed subordinaries are those that have a particular place to go on a shield—or at least a very limited range of places.

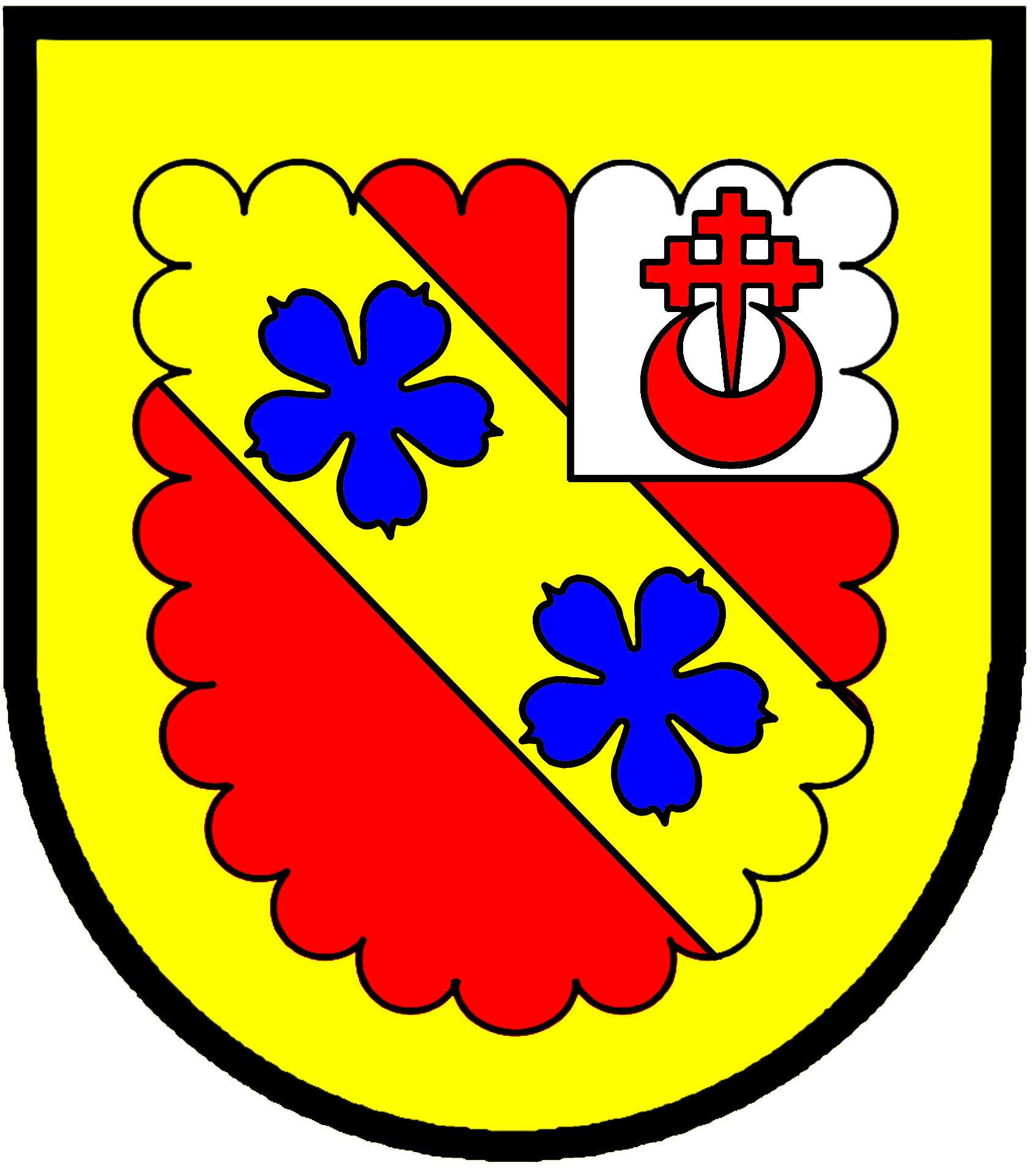
a canton—Gules; on a bend or two cinquefoils azure, on a sinister canton argent a cross crosslet fitchy issuing out of a crescent of the first; a bordure engrailed or for difference—Cook, Scotland

- Quarter: the dexter chief quadrant of the shield
  - Canton: smaller than the quarter, formally said to occupy one-ninth of the shield, though sometimes drawn smaller, but generally accepted as a square 1/3 the width of the shield. The canton is often said to be the quarter's diminutive, but perhaps it should be treated as a subordinary in its own right as it fulfils heraldic functions not fulfilled by the quarter, and behaves according to its own special rules—as for example in the case of the canton on which baronets in the UK may display the badges of their 'rank', which is very rarely shown occupying such a large area as the upper left third of the field, and is usually much less and very often shown not as square but as a rectangle with its longer side vertical. Very occasionally a 'sinister canton' is found, on the shield's other side.
- Flaunches, always borne in pairs: a circular arc emerging out of each flank of the shield.
- Fret: interlacing bendlet, bendlet sinister and mascle.
- Gore: two arcs meeting in the fess point to form a triangular segment.
- Gyron: the lower half of a quarter cut diagonally, said to be an old charge but rare although there are modern examples (e. g. de Cluseau)
- Orle: A bordure separated from the outside of the shield. Like the bordure the orle takes on the shape of the shield or flag it is on. Although the orle's diminutive is the tressure, there are examples of "fillet orles" (orles narrower than usual). When a number of charges are arranged as if on a bordure, they are said to be in orle or to form an orle of such charges. It is often said that an orle may not have other charges charged on it, but the Scots Public Register has the coat of Norie of Noristone: 'Parted per pale argent and sable ane orle engrailed on both sydes charged with four quaterfoiules within a bordur all counterchanged'.
  - Tressure: a thinner version and hence diminutive of the orle. The most famous tressure is probably the double tressure flory counter flory in the royal coat of arms of Scotland. Tressures with other ornamentation exist, such as with maple leaves, crescents, thistles and roses.
a quarter—Argent, a quarter gules

a canton—Argent, a canton gules

flaunches—Argent, flaunches gules

a fret—Argent, a fret gules. Arms of the Blake family.

an orle—Argent, an orle azure (D'argent à l'orle d'azur—Lacroisille, Tarn, France)

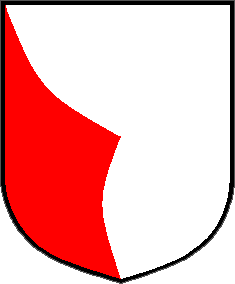
a gore—Argent, a gore gules

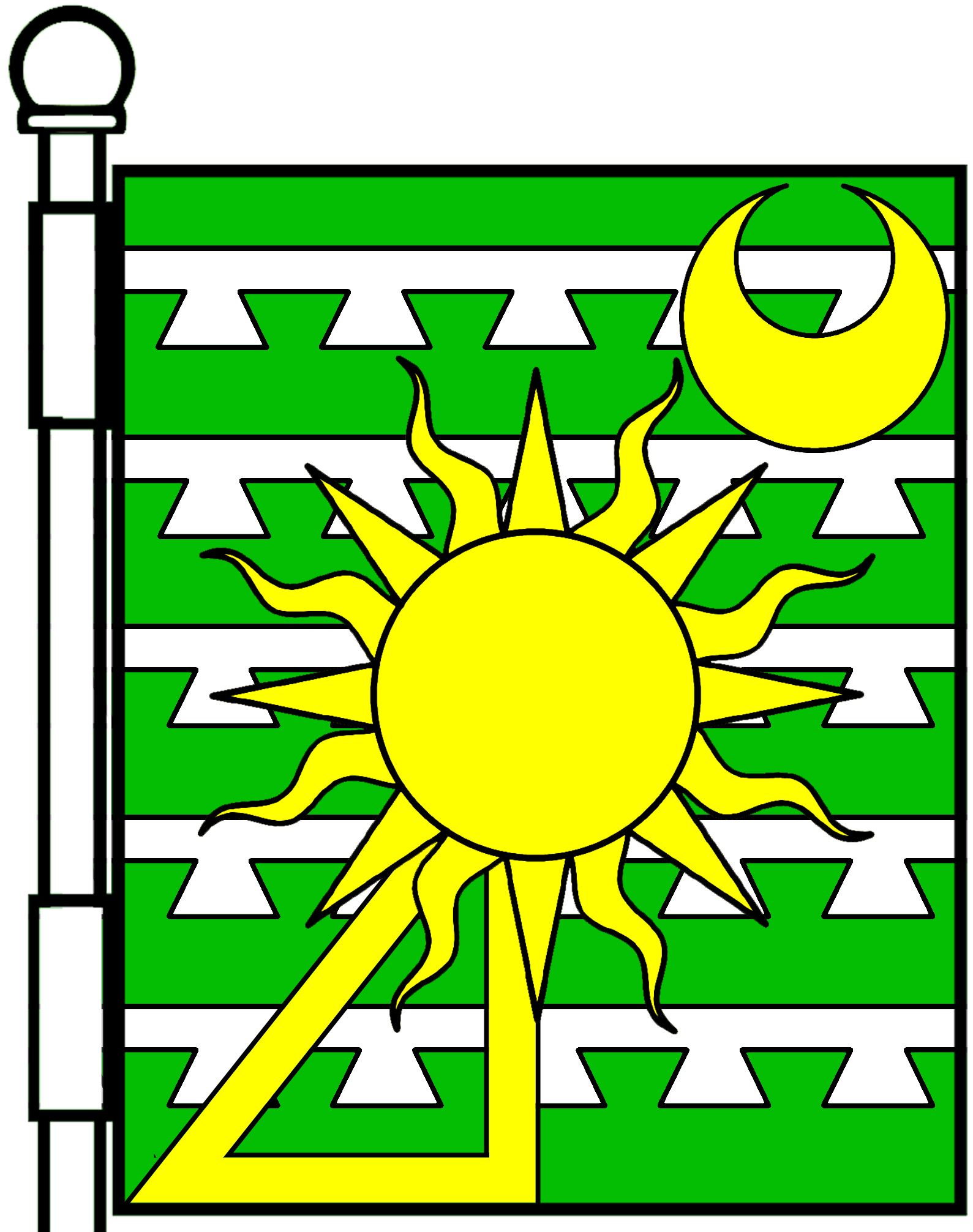
a gyron—Vert five barrulets dovetailed on the lower sides Argent, in dexter base a gyron voided of the field in sinister chief a crescent over all at centre point the sun in his splendour all Or.—Green, Scotland

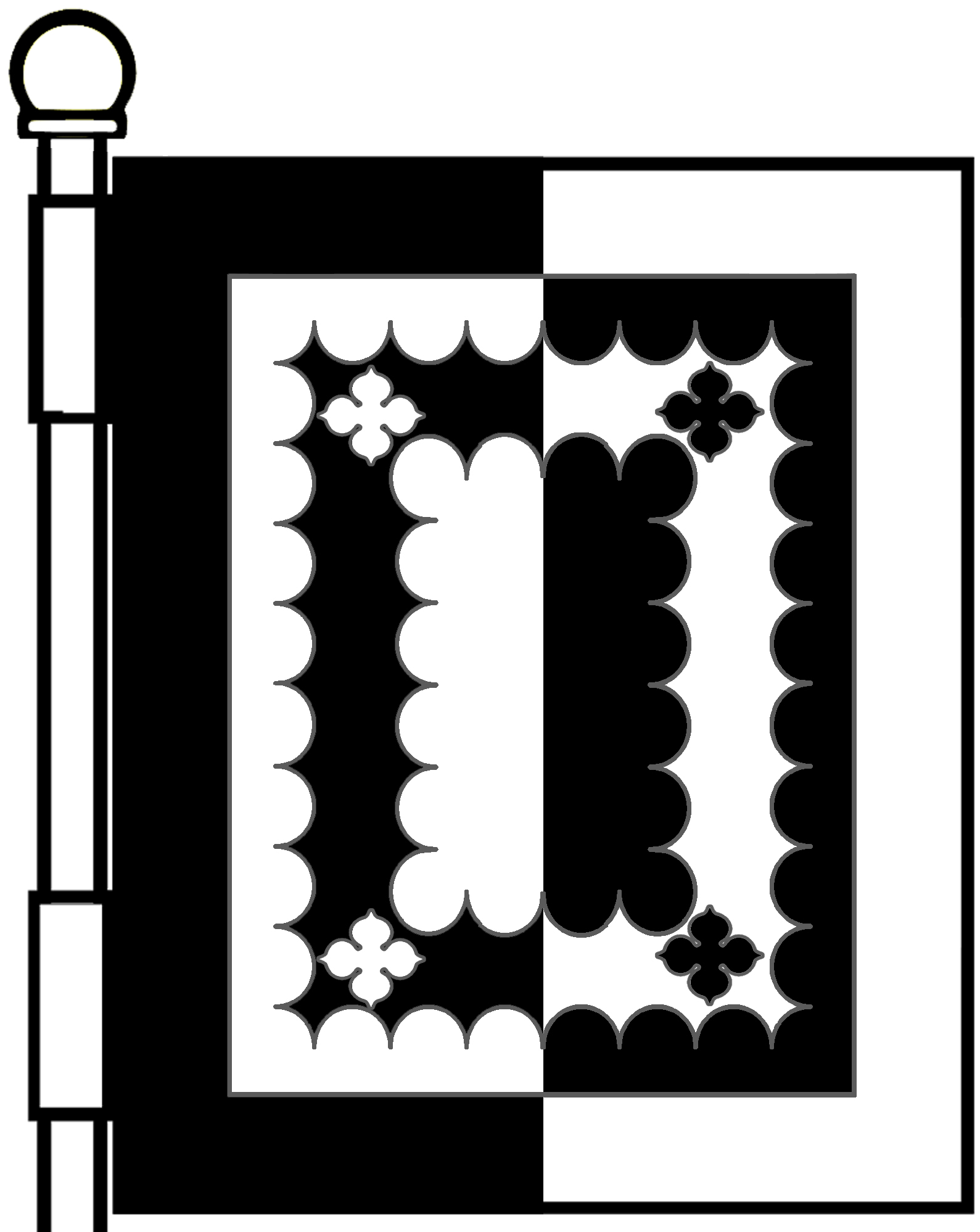
an orle charged—Parted per pale argent and sable; an orle engrailed on both sides charged with four quatrefoils within a bordure, all counter changed—Norie, Scotland

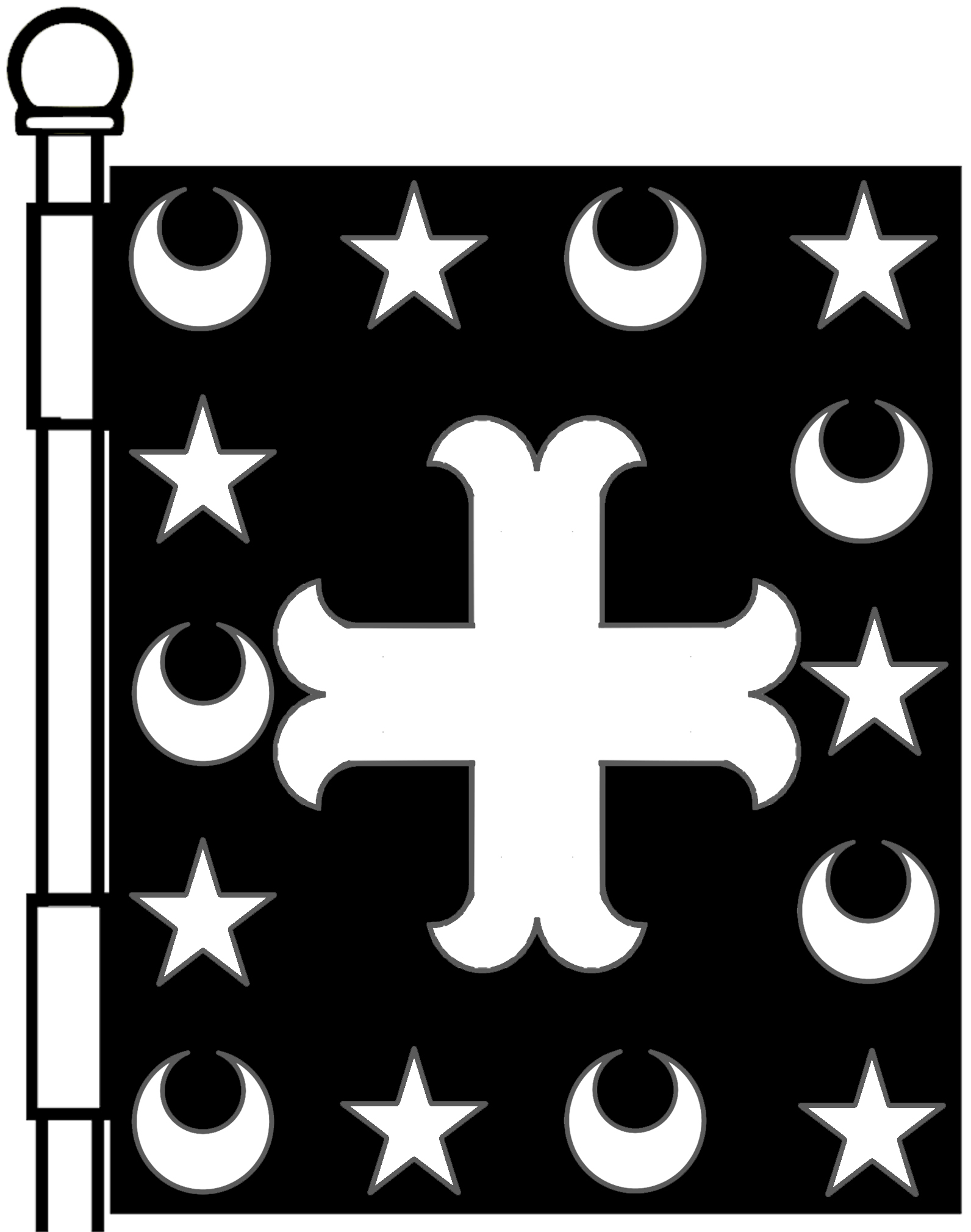
an orle of crescents and mullets—Sable; a cross moline within an orle of crescents and mullets alternately, argent—Sibbald, Scotland

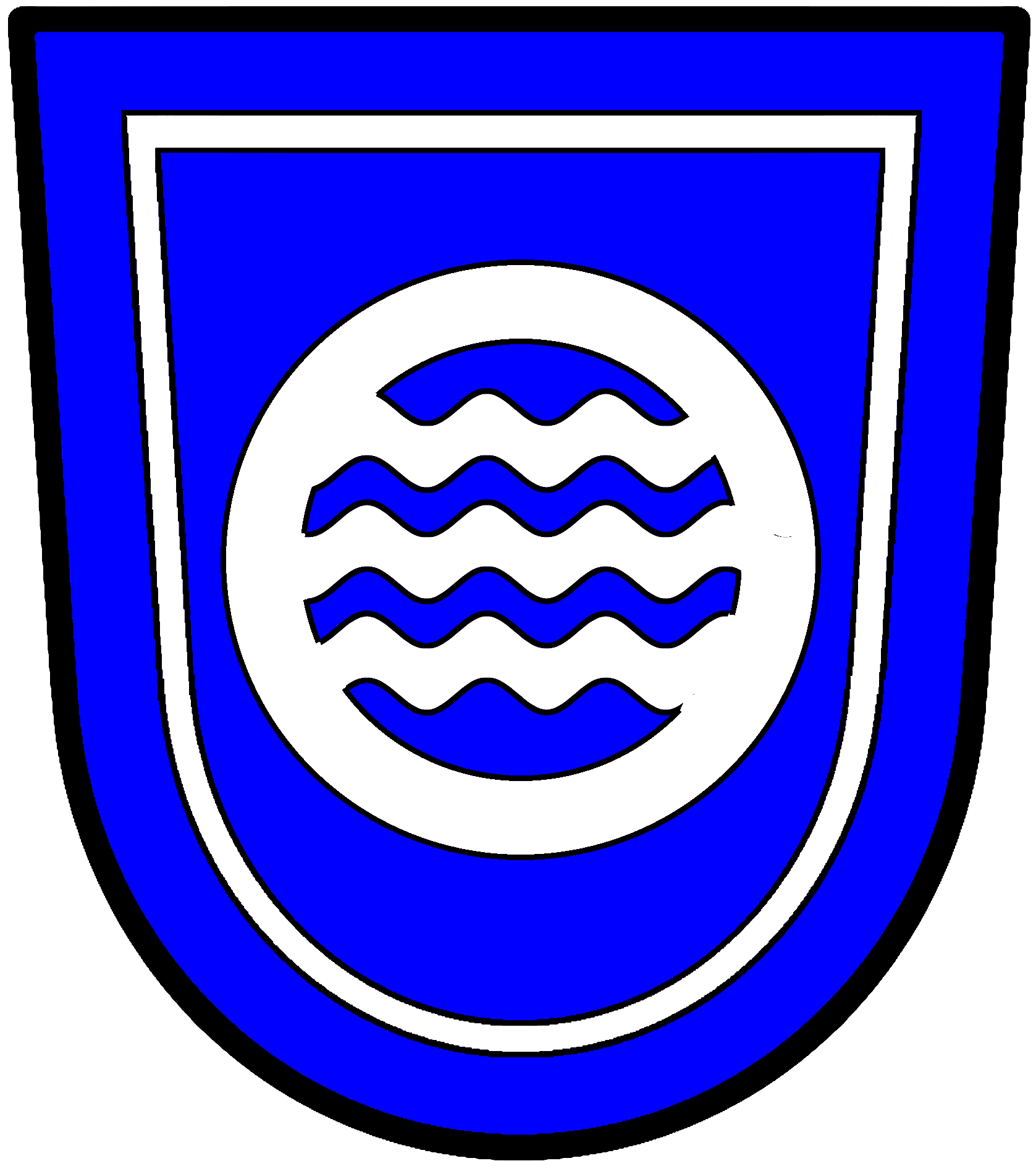
a tressure—Azure, an annulet, therewithin three barrulets wavy, conjoined, all within a tressure, argent—Umgeni Water Board, RSA

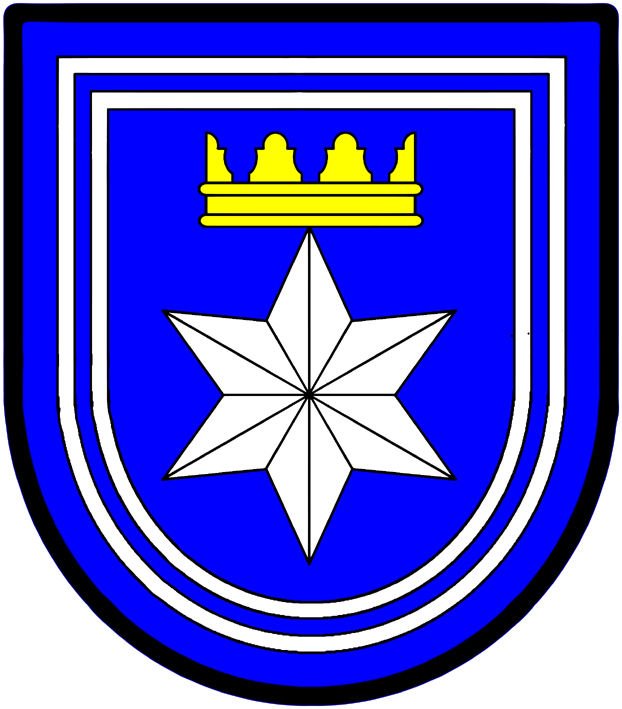
a double tressure—Azure; a facetted six pointed star [mullet] argent ensigned with a gable crown or, the whole within a double tressure argent—Langenhoven, RSA

==== Mobile subordinaries ====
Other subordinaries can be placed anywhere on the field.

- Escutcheon: a shield used as a charge.
an escutcheon—Or, an escutcheon sable—Bourigeole, Aude, France

3 escutcheons—Or, three escutcheons gules—d'Abbeville, France

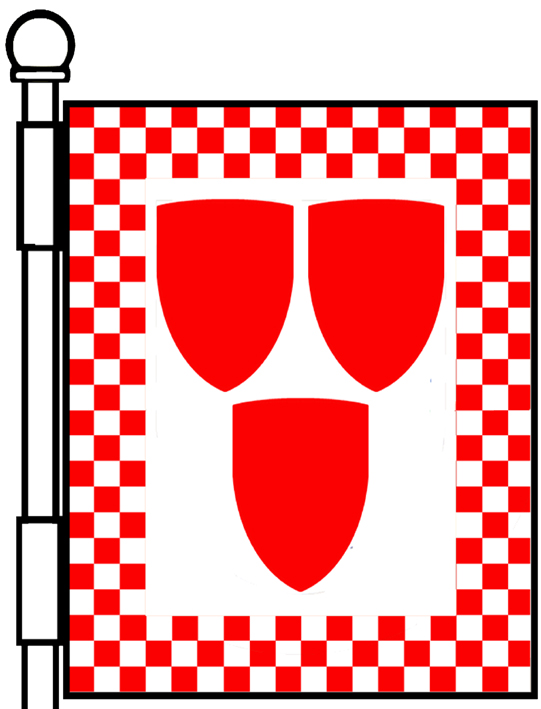
3 escutcheons —Argent; three escutcheons gules; within a bordure chequy gules and argent—Hay of Pitfour, Scotland

escutcheon en surtout—Arms of Murray, Duke of Atholl, Scotland includes an escutcheon en surtout for the Chiefship of the Name of Murray and with the crown of a marquess for the Marquessate of Tullibardine

- escutcheon of pretence or en surtout—When one escutcheon is borne in the centre of the coat, it is sometimes called an inescutcheon or an escutcheon of pretence or an escutcheon en surtout. Such centrally placed escutcheons usually have some particular significance. For example, in arms of dominion an inescutcheon typically shows the dynastic arms of the prince, whose possessions are shown in the quarters of the main shield; current examples include the arms of the Danish royal family, with an inescutcheon of the house of Oldenburg, and the coat of arms of Spain, with an inescutcheon of the house of Bourbon-Anjou. In Scots heraldry the escutcheon en surtout serves several different purposes. This all comes under the heading of marshalling.

- Lozenge: a rhombus with its long axis upright, resembling the diamond of playing-cards.

- Fusil: a thin lozenge; very much taller than it is wide.
- Mascle: a voided lozenge (i.e. with a largish lozenge shaped hole)
- Rustre (very rare): a lozenge pierced (i.e. with a smallish round hole)

3 lozenges—Gules, three lozenges argent— Guillaume de Haer (according to Gelre)

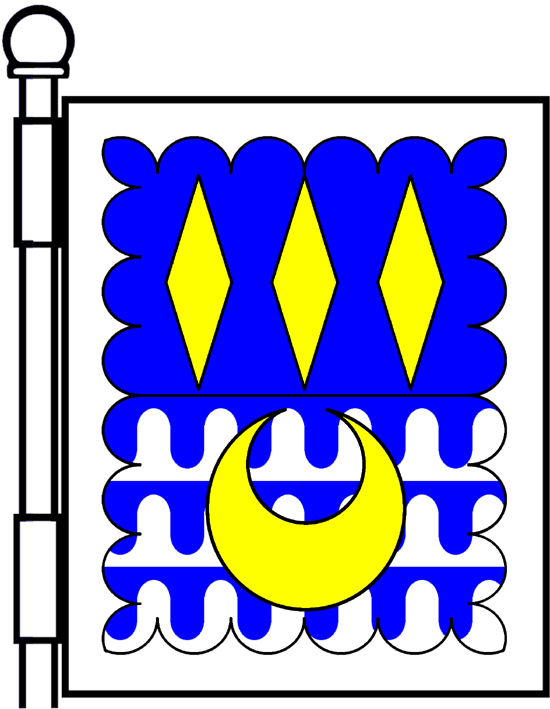
3 fusils—Per fess azure and vair ancient; three fusils in chief and a crescent in base, or; a bordure engrailed argent—Freeman of Murtle, Scotland

9 mascles—Gules, nine mascles or—Rohan family of France

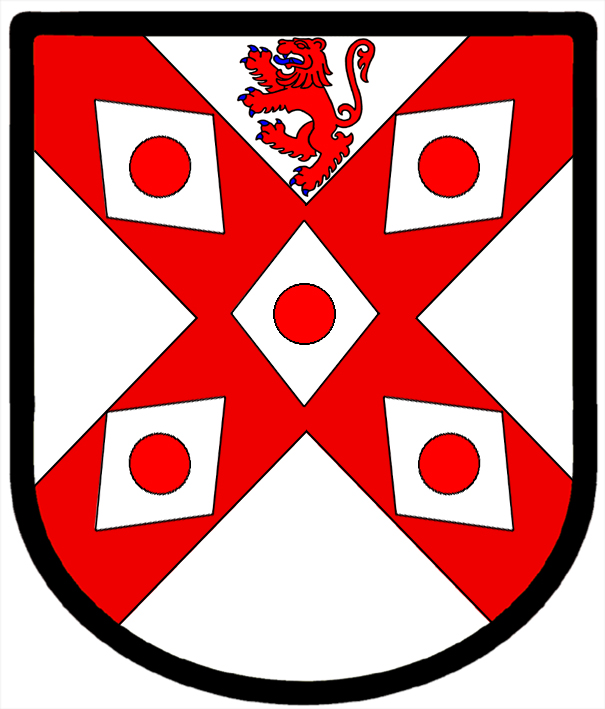
5 rustres—Argent; on a saltire gules five rustres argent, in chief a lion rampant of the second (gules)—Dalrymple of Woodhead, Scotland
- Roundel: a disc or ball, as in the arms of the Duchy of Cornwall or of the Medici. In the Anglophone heraldries differently coloured roundels have different names, e.g. a roundel or is called a bezant and a roundel azure is called a hurt. French heraldry solely distinguishes besants (roundels of a metal tincture) and tourteaux (roundels of a colour tincture): hence, the Canadian Francophone versions of blazons follow suit — Anglophone hurt is Francophone tourteau d'azur, and Anglophone bezant is a besant d'or

- Annulet: a voided roundel (i.e. with a largish round hole, resembling a ring)

a hurt (roundel azure)—Or, a hurt; D'or au tourteau d'azur—Launaguet, Haute-Garonne, France

10 bezants (roundels or)—Azure, ten bezants in pile; D'azur à dix besants d'or— Jean IV de Rieux, France

3 annulets—Gules, three annulets in pile argent; De gueules à trois annelets d'argent— Mâcon, France
- Billet: a small rectangle, resembling a brick or a letter. Billets are normally vertical (as in the arms of the Kingdom of the Netherlands), but can be horizontal (as in the arms of Friesland).
10 billets—Azure, ten billets or; D'azur à dix billettes d'or— Baud, Morbihan, France

== Variations ==
=== Lines ===
Ordinaries need not be bounded by straight lines.

engrailed—Sable, a cross engrailed argent

dancetty—Azure, a bend dancetty or

wavy—Vert, three bars wavy argent

fir-twigged (sapiny) and wavy—Or, a bend upper edge fir twigged (sapiny), lower edge wavy, vert

=== Diminutives ===
When a coat of arms contains two or more of an ordinary, they are nearly always blazoned (in English) as diminutives of the ordinary, as follows.

==== Diminutives of the pale ====
- pallet: theoretically half the width of a pale.
- endorse: half the width of a pallet; also found in pairs on either side of a pale when the term "endorsed" is used
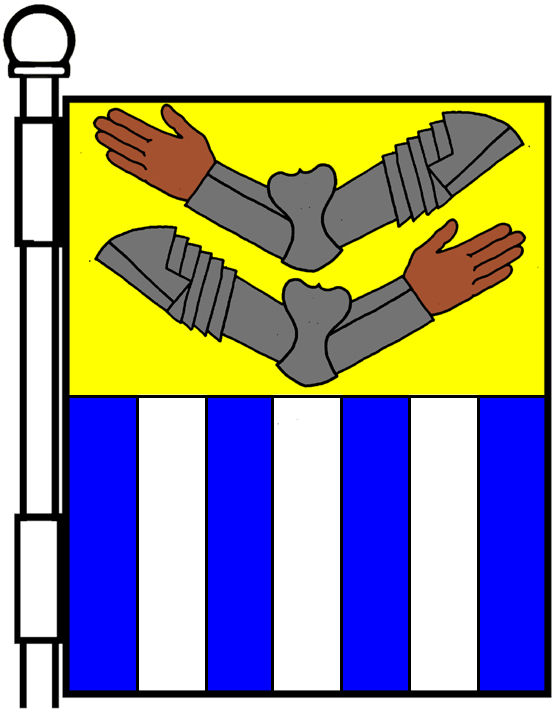
3 pallets—Per fess or and azure; in chief a dexter arm vambraced and a sinister arm contourny vambraced, proper and in base three pallets argent—Armstrong, USA (Scots arms)

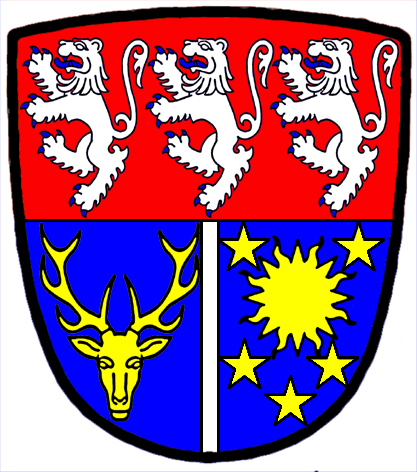
an endorse—Per fess gules and azure; in chief three lions rampant, argent, in base an endorse argent between, dexter, a stag's head cabossed, and, sinister, a sun in its splendour, between five mullets, or—Ross and Cromarty District Council, `Scotland

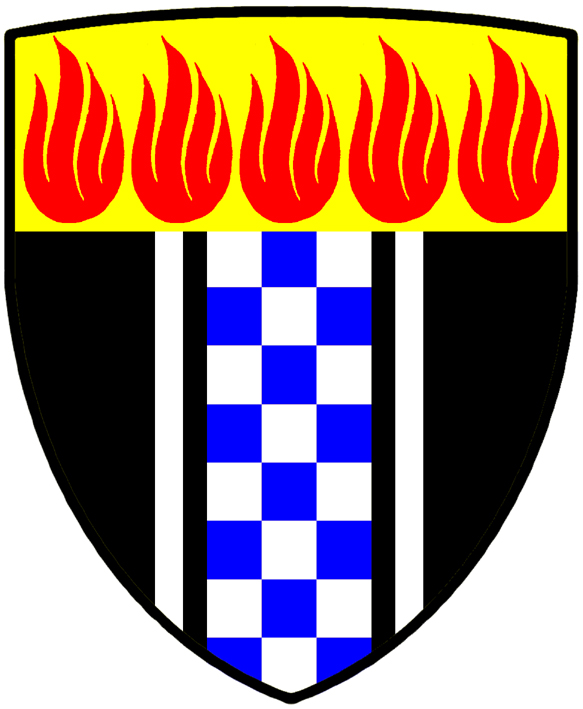
pale endorsed—Sable; a pale chequy argent and azure of 24 pieces, endorsed argent; on a chief or five flames gules—Secunda Health Committee, RSA

==== Diminutives of the fess ====
- bar, see above.
- closet, half the width of the bar
- barrulet, narrower than both.
- hamade (also called hamaide or hummet): a bar couped which doesn't reach the edges of the shield, usually in threes
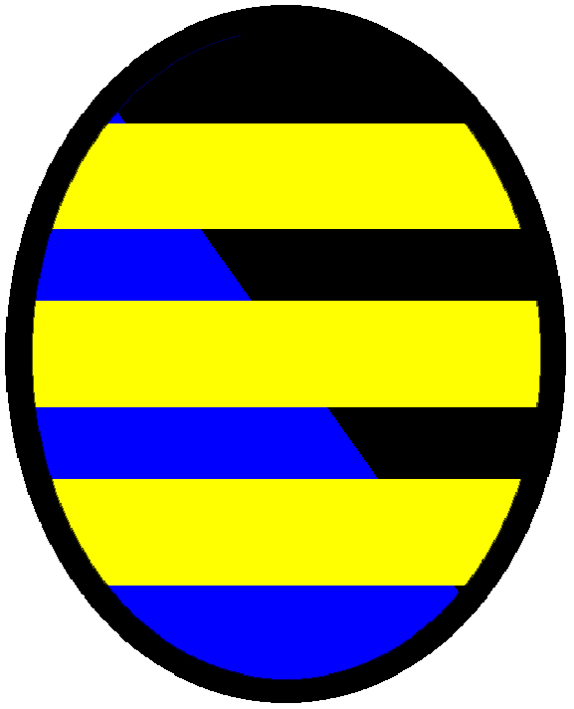
3 bars—Per bend sable and azure; three bars or—Kenan, Scotland

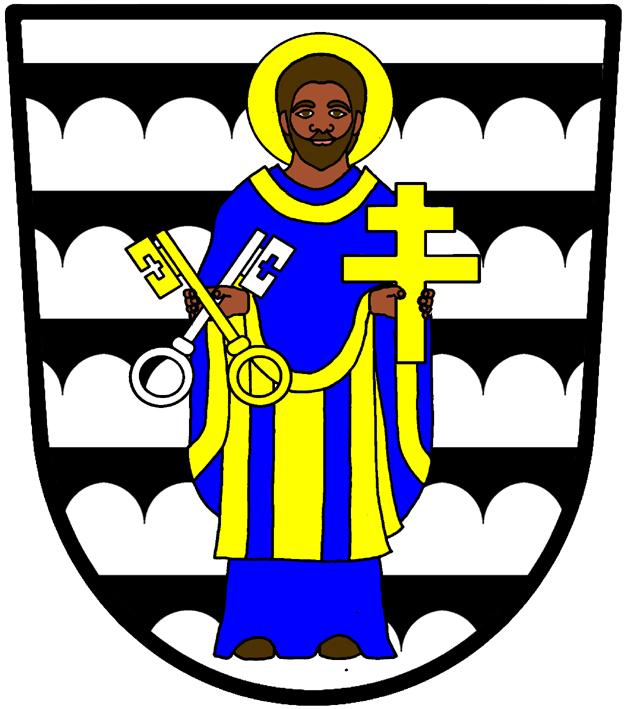
5 barrulets—Argent; five barrulets sable, engrailed on their under edges, the figure of St Peter enhaloed, proper, vested azure and or, in his dexter hand two keys in saltire or and argent—Burgh of Thurso, Scotland

3 hamades—Argent, three hamades gules

==== Diminutives of the bend ====
- bendlet, half the width of a bend.
- ribbon or riband, half the width of a bendlet, occasionally called a cost
- baton: a bendlet couped which doesn't reach the edges of the shield, often said to be only a bendlet sinister couped, but has certainly been used as a couped bendlet 'dexter' since the 17th century at the latest
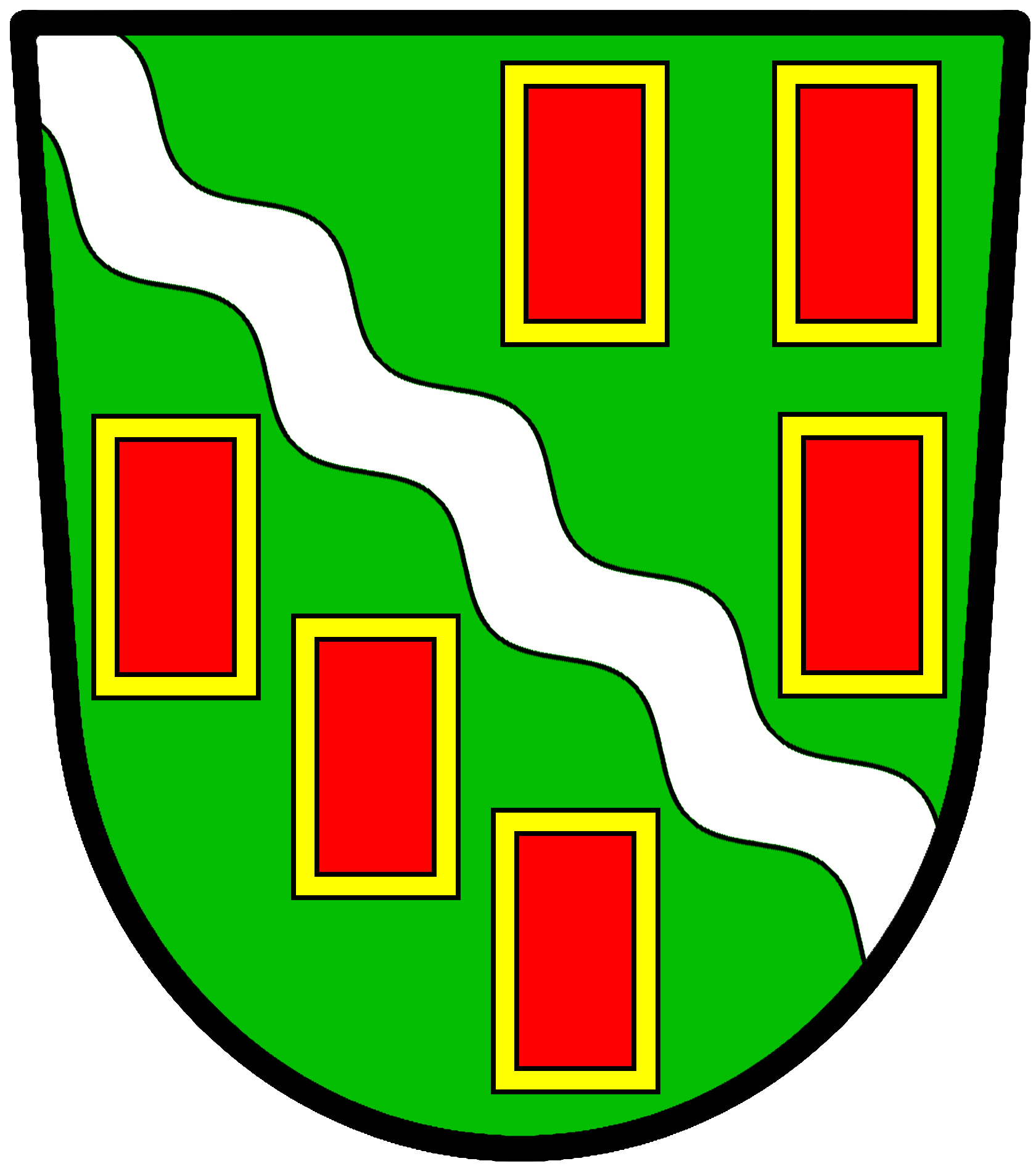
a bendlet—Vert; a bendlet wavy argent between six billets gules, each fimbriated or—Stroud Urban District Council, England

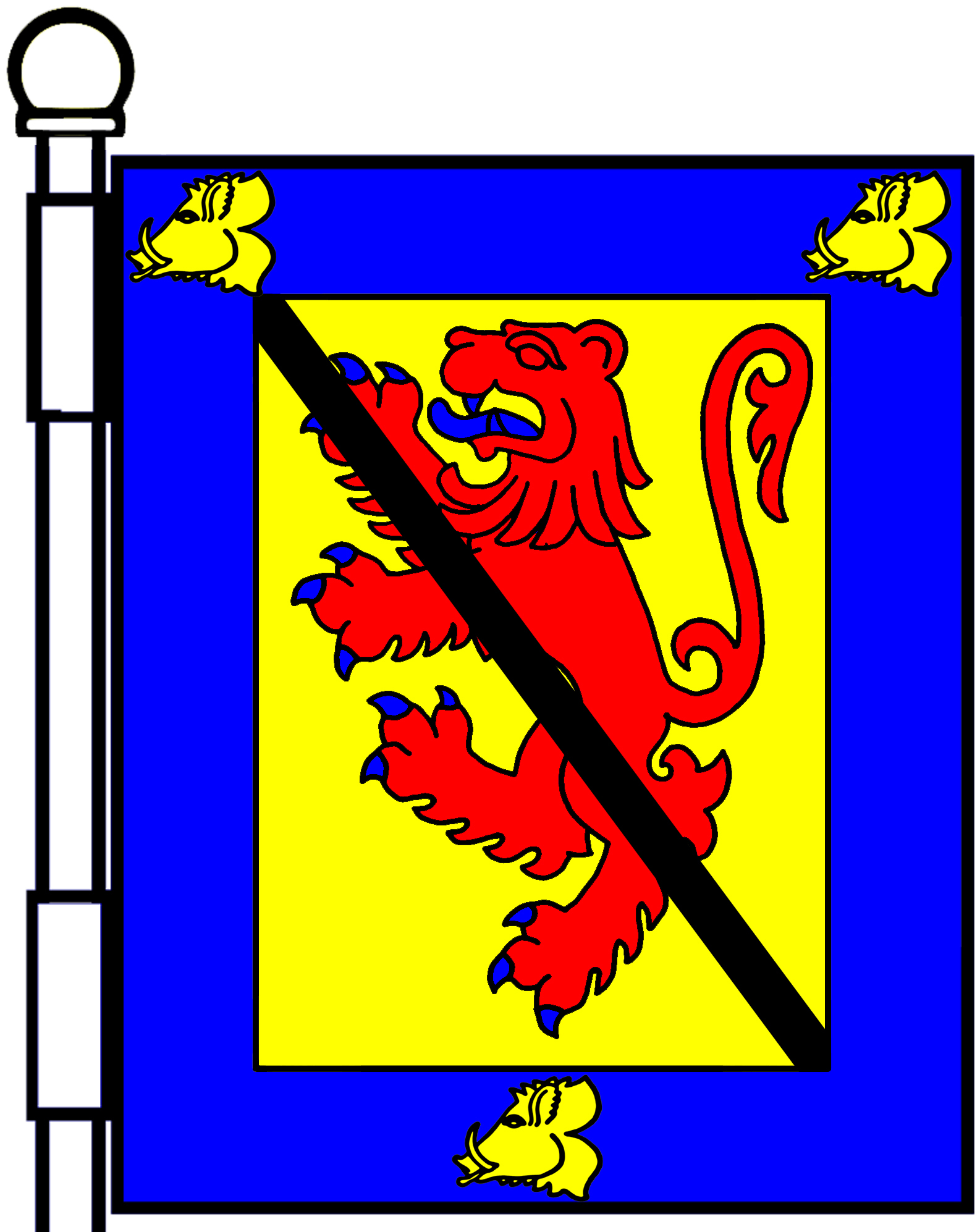
a ribbon (or riband)—Or, lion rampant gules, surmounted of a ribbon sable; within a bordure azure charged with three boars' heads erased, or—Drummond of Hawthornden, Scotland

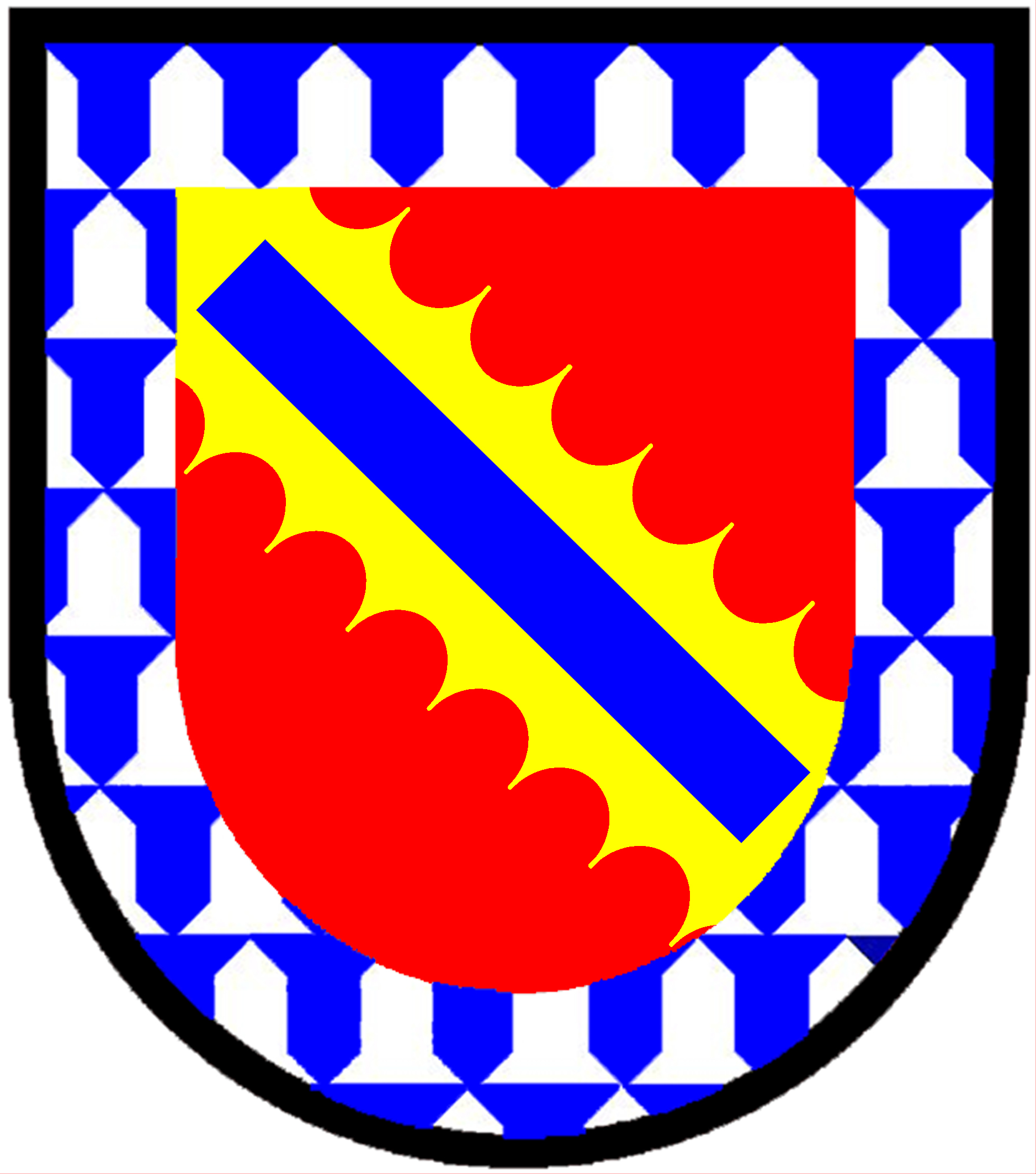
a baton—Gules; on a bend engrailed or a baton azure; within a bordure vair—Elliot, Scotland (matriculated 1693)

==== Diminutive of the bend sinister ====
- bendlet sinister, half the width of a bend sinister, also very occasionally called a scarpe;
- baton sinister, a bendlet sinister couped
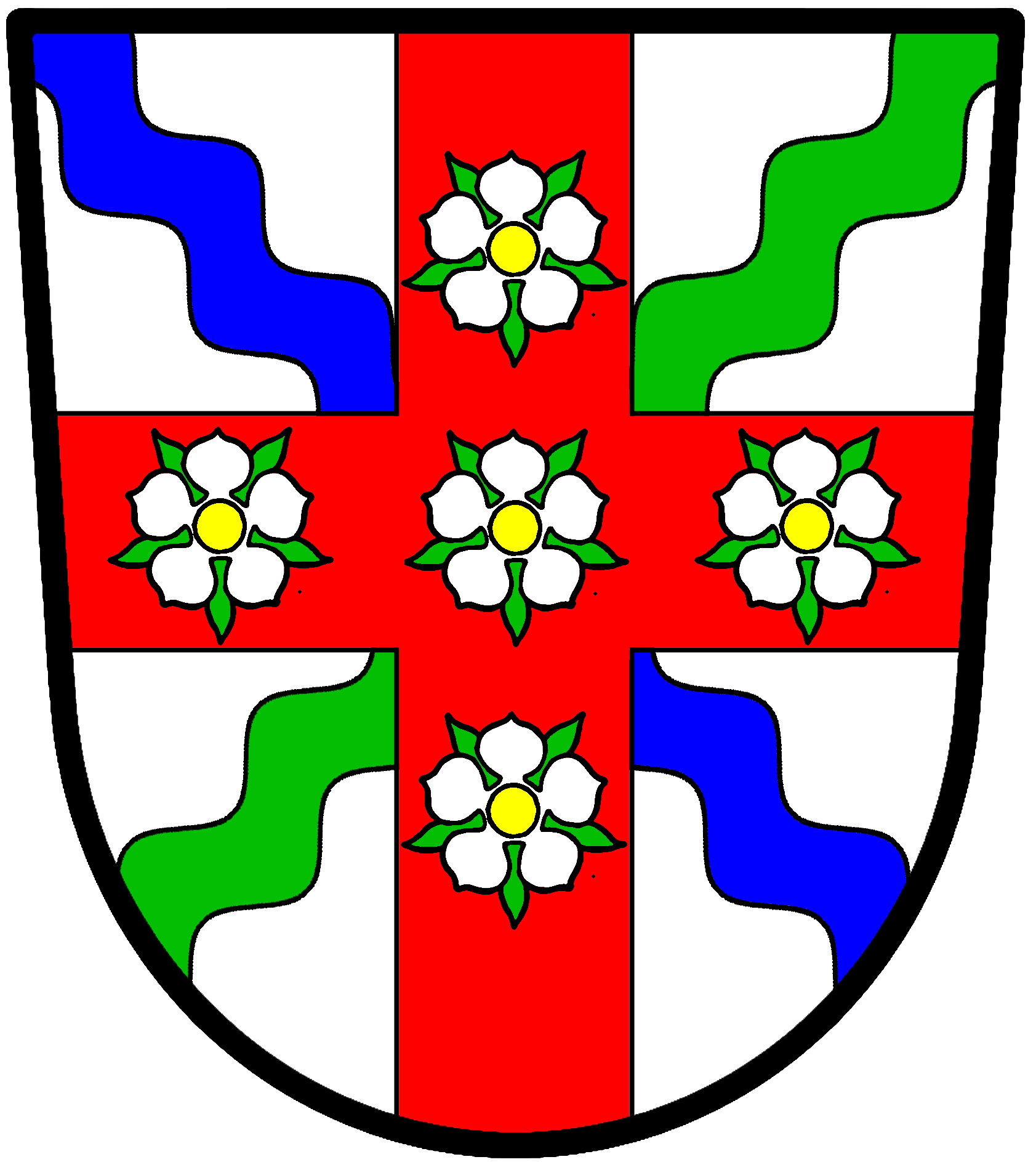
a bendlet sinister—Argent, a bendlet wavy azure and a bendlet sinister wavy vert, over all on a cross gules five roses argent barbed and seeded proper—North Yorkshire County Council, England

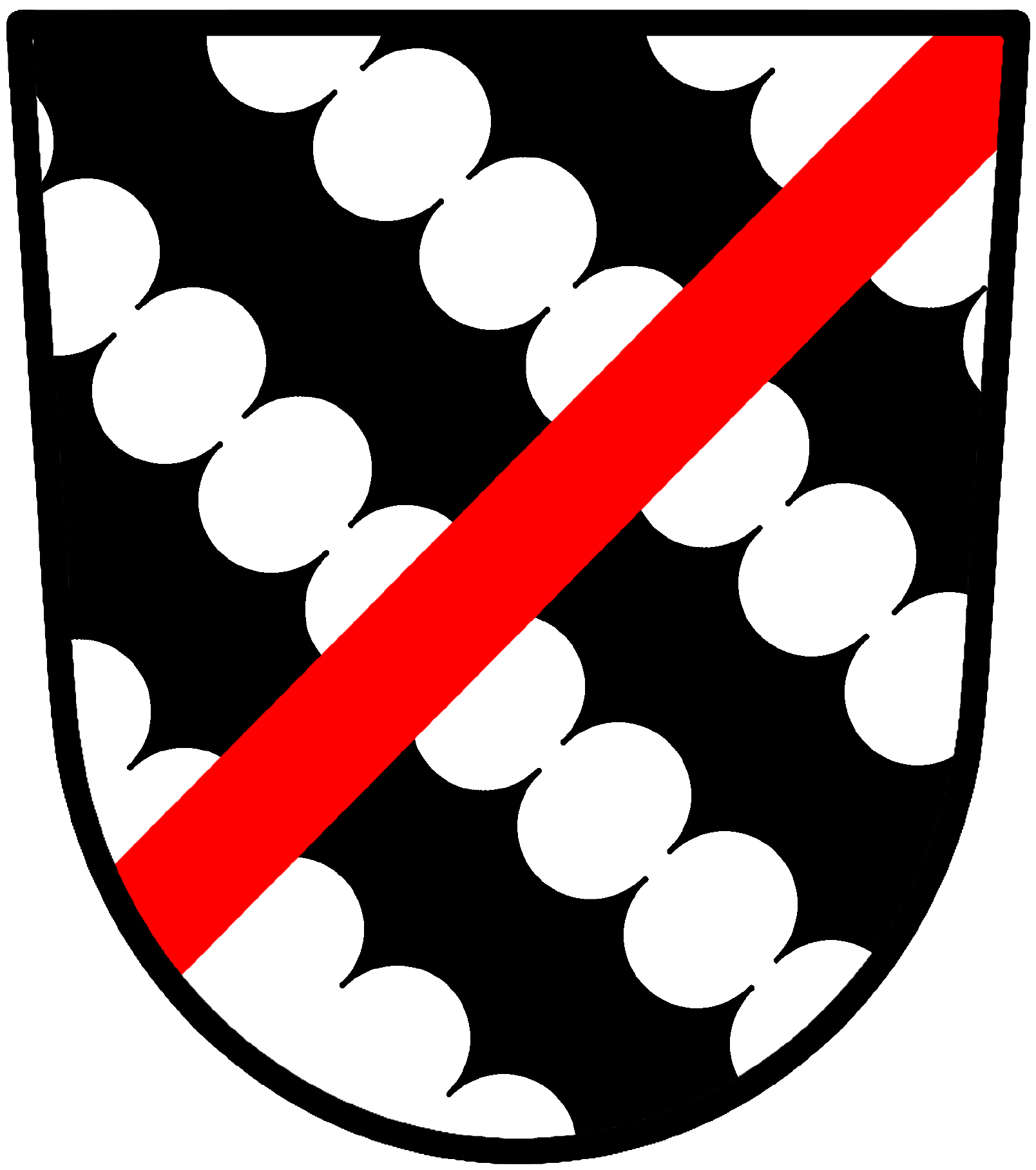
a scarpe—Argent, three bends engrailed sable, over all a scarpe gules—Blage, England

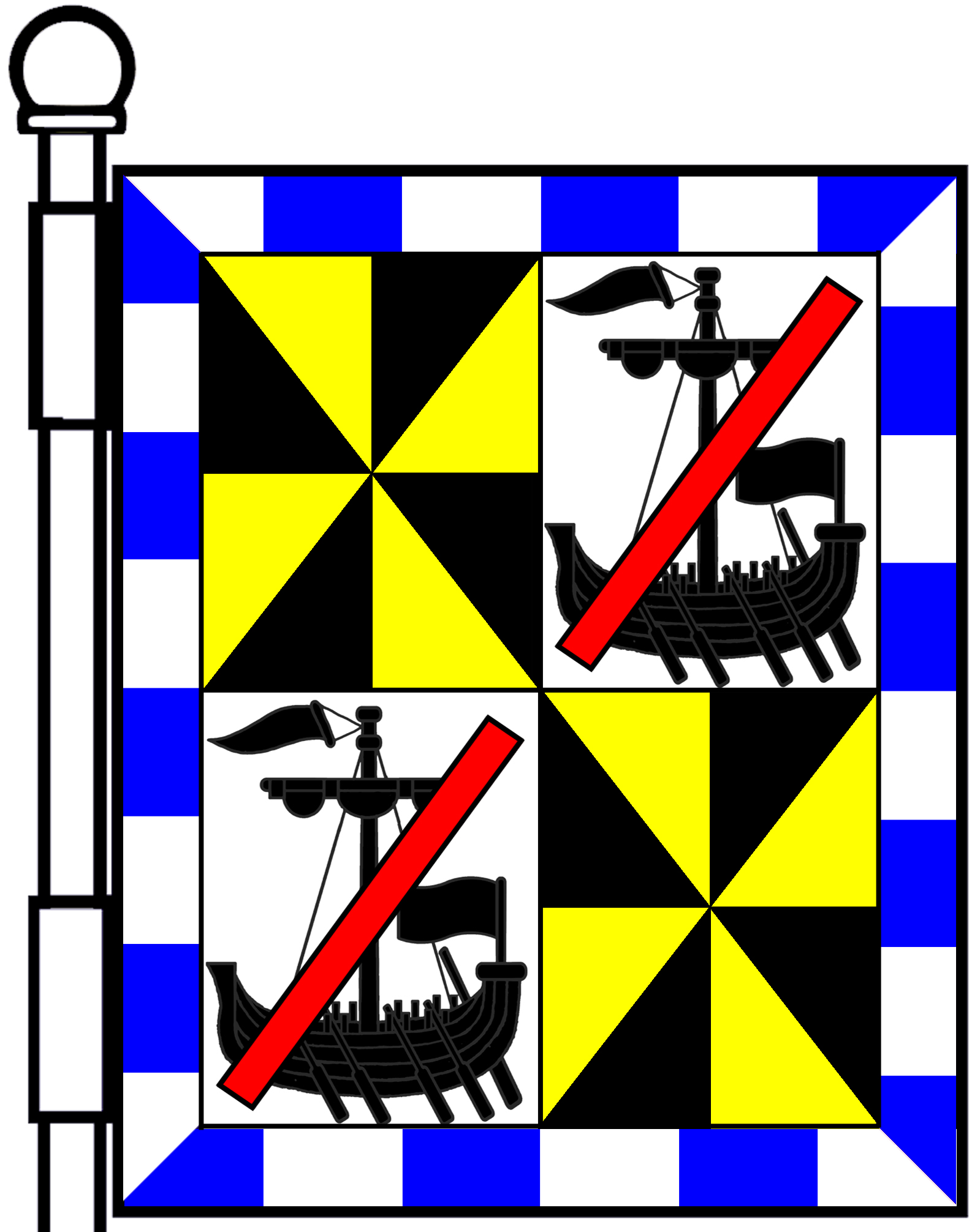
a baton sinister—Argent, a galley (or lymphad) sable, sails furled, flags and pinnets flying and oars in action, debruised with a baton sinister couped gules—Campbell (second and third quarters, all quarters within a bordure compony argent and azure; matriculated 1763)

==== Diminutives of the chevron ====
- chevronel: half the width of a chevron.
- couple close: half the width of a chevronnel, but only to be found in pairs with a chevron between them; the phrase 'a chevron between two couple closes' has the alternative 'a chevron couple closed'; in essence the same as cottising a chevron; couple close is not found much in modern blazons
3 chevronels—Argent, three chevronels gules—Cardinal Richelieu, France

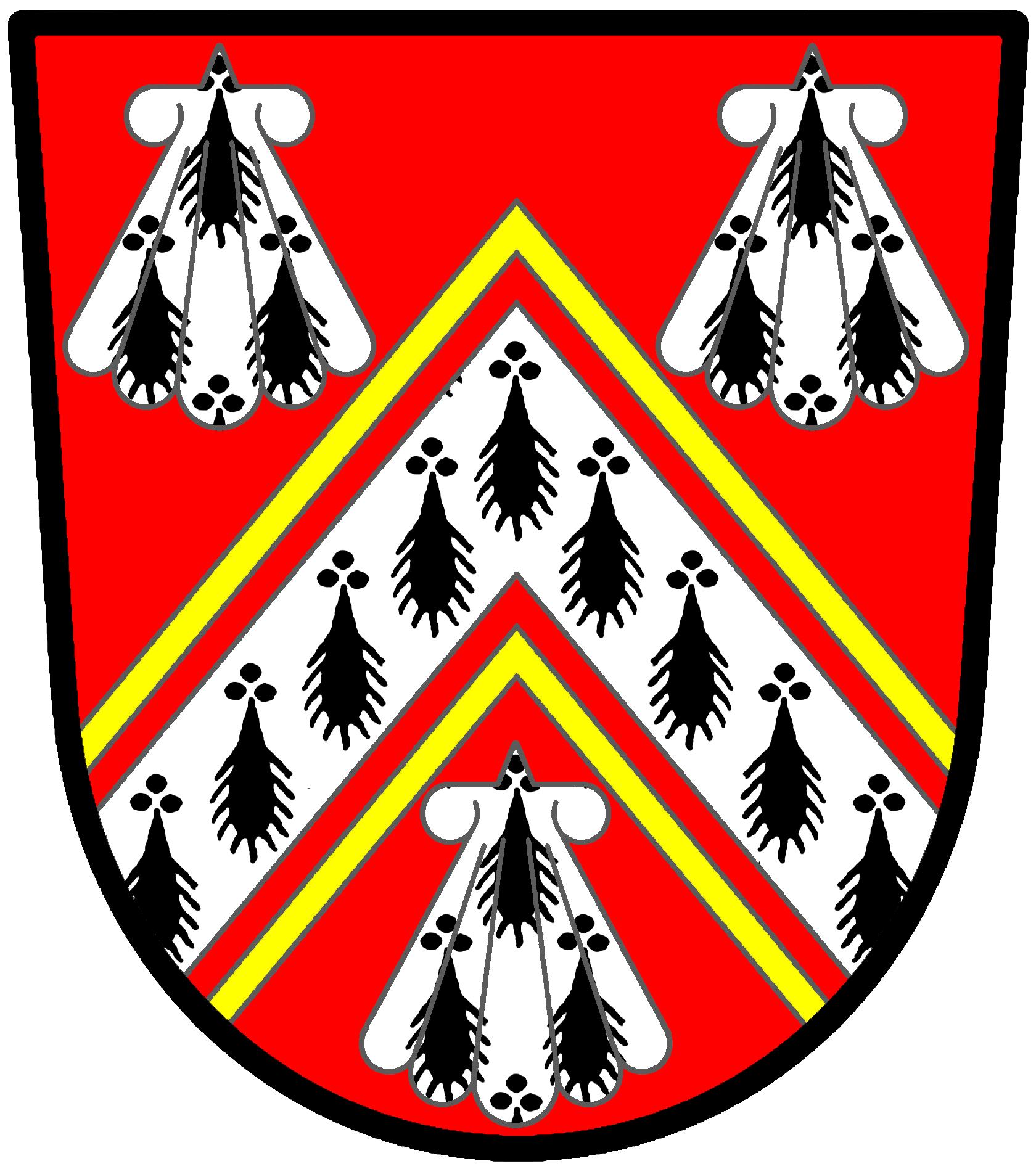
couple closes (or couple closed)—Gules; a chevron ermine, couple closed [between two couple closes] or, between three escallops of the second [ermine]—Browne, England

==== Diminutives of the chief ====
- comble, "half" a chief; rare in the Anglophone heraldries, but does appear in the civic heraldry of France—there even being at least one chief charged with a comble
- chief enhanced, again "half" a chief, sometimes said not to be a diminutive, but is indistinguishable from the comble which is.
- fillet: said, by those who do not believe in the comble or chief enhanced, to be the nearest that the chief comes to having a diminutive, which is effectively a barrulet conjoined to a chief at its bottom edge—blazoned either as 'a chief supported by a fillet' or as 'a chief filleted' (or things similar); occasionally appears in its own right—though it is then very little other than a barrulet enhanced.
a comble—Argent; three martlets sable; on a comble azure a cross or; a franc quartier [quarter] azure charged with a sword argent, hilted and pomelled or—Nairne of Meikleour (fourth grand quarter for Flahault)

a comble on a chief—Gules, a ship or, sails set ermine, on a sea in base vert, a chief also ermine charged with a comble gules charged with three bees or—Nantes, Loire-Atlantique, France

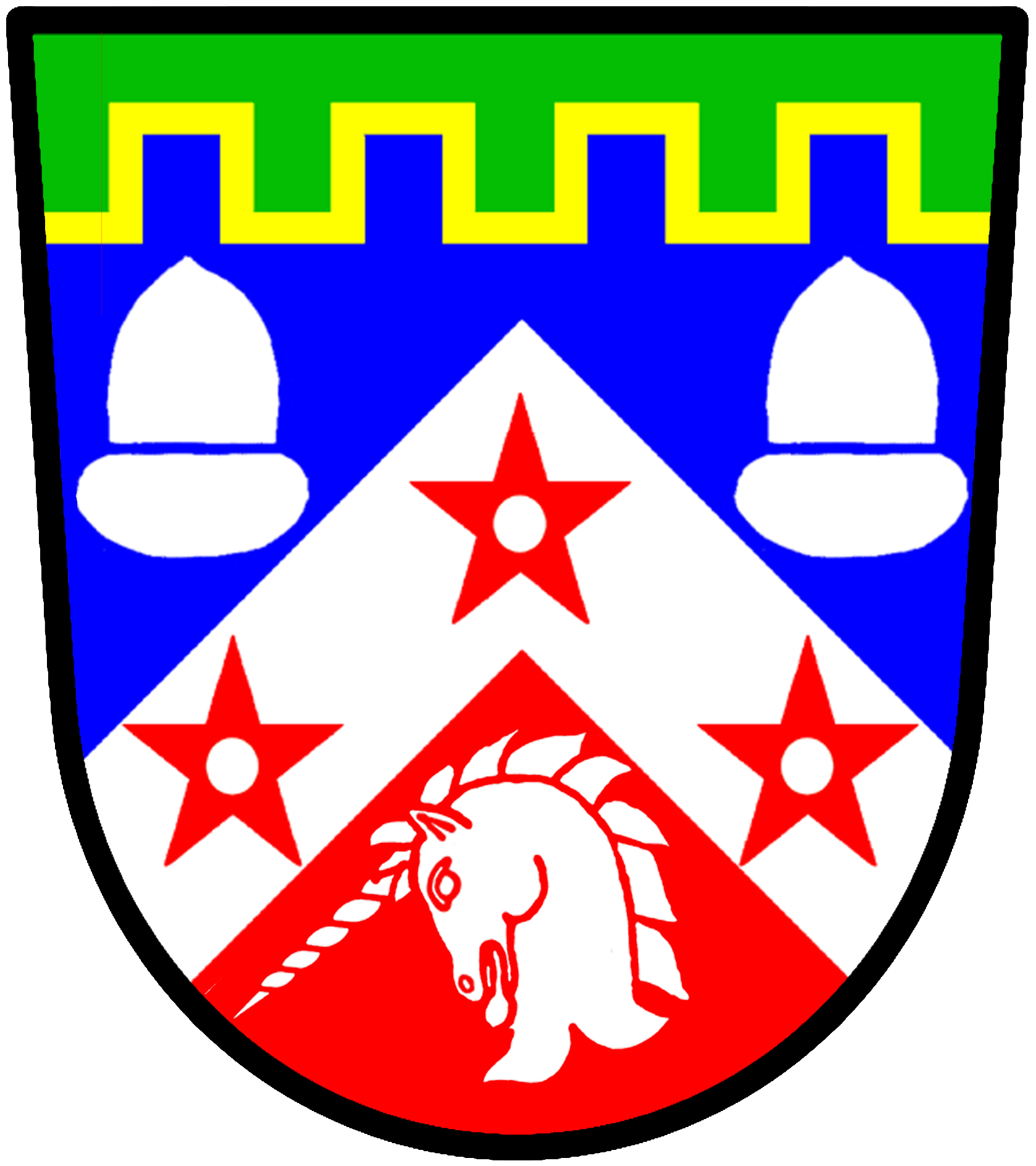
a chief enhanced—Per chevron Azure and Gules on a chevron between in chief two acorns and in base a unicorn's head erased all Argent three mullets Gules pierced a chief enhanced and embattled Vert fimbriated Or. — Matthews, Scotland

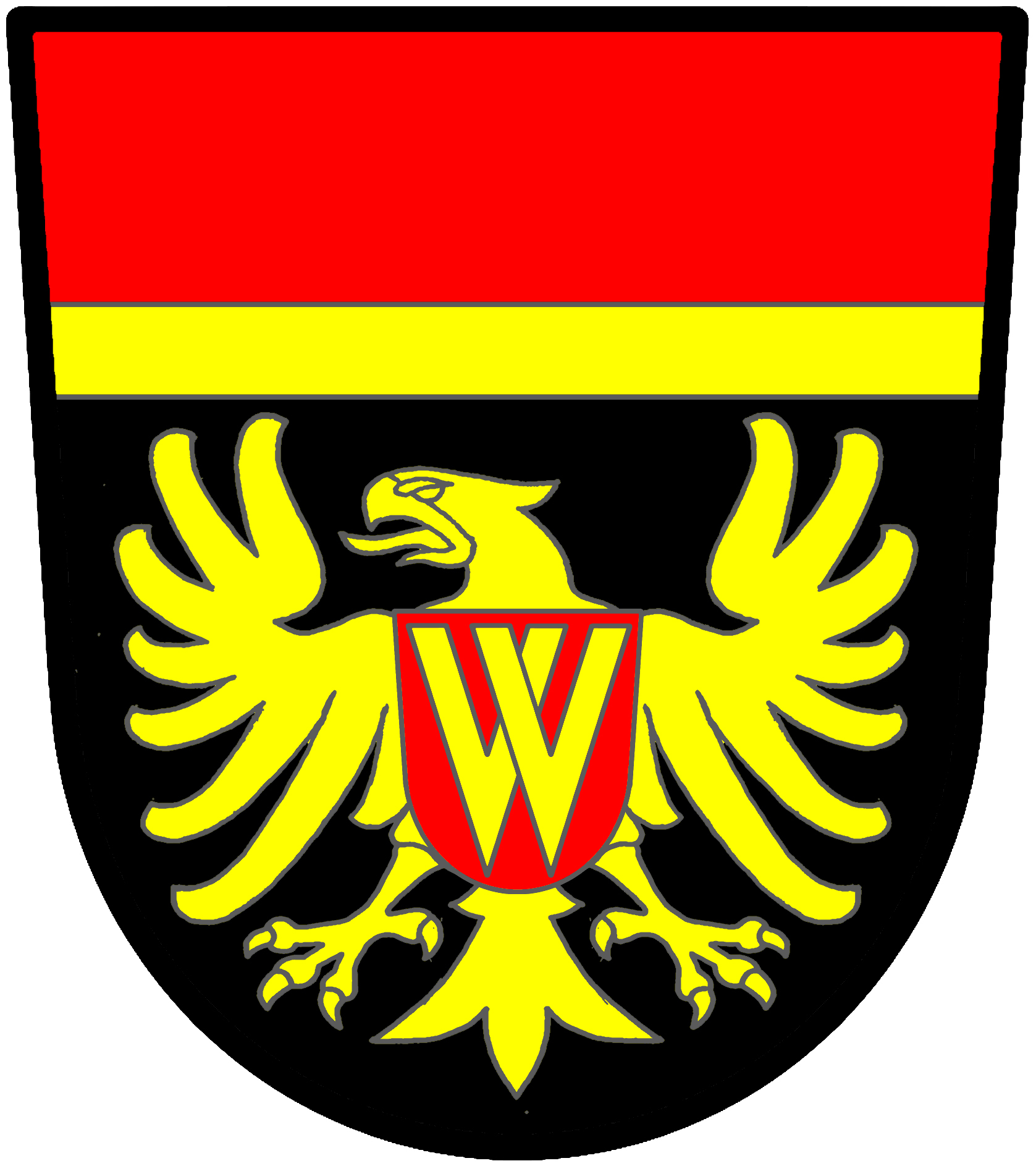
a fillet and a chief—Sable; an eagle displayed or, charged on the breast with an escutcheon gules, thereupon two chevrons couped interlaced inverted or; a chief gules filleted [supported by a fillet] or—Wing Riders of South Africa

==== Diminutive of the cross ====
- cross fillet (or fillet cross), somewhat less than half the width of a cross.
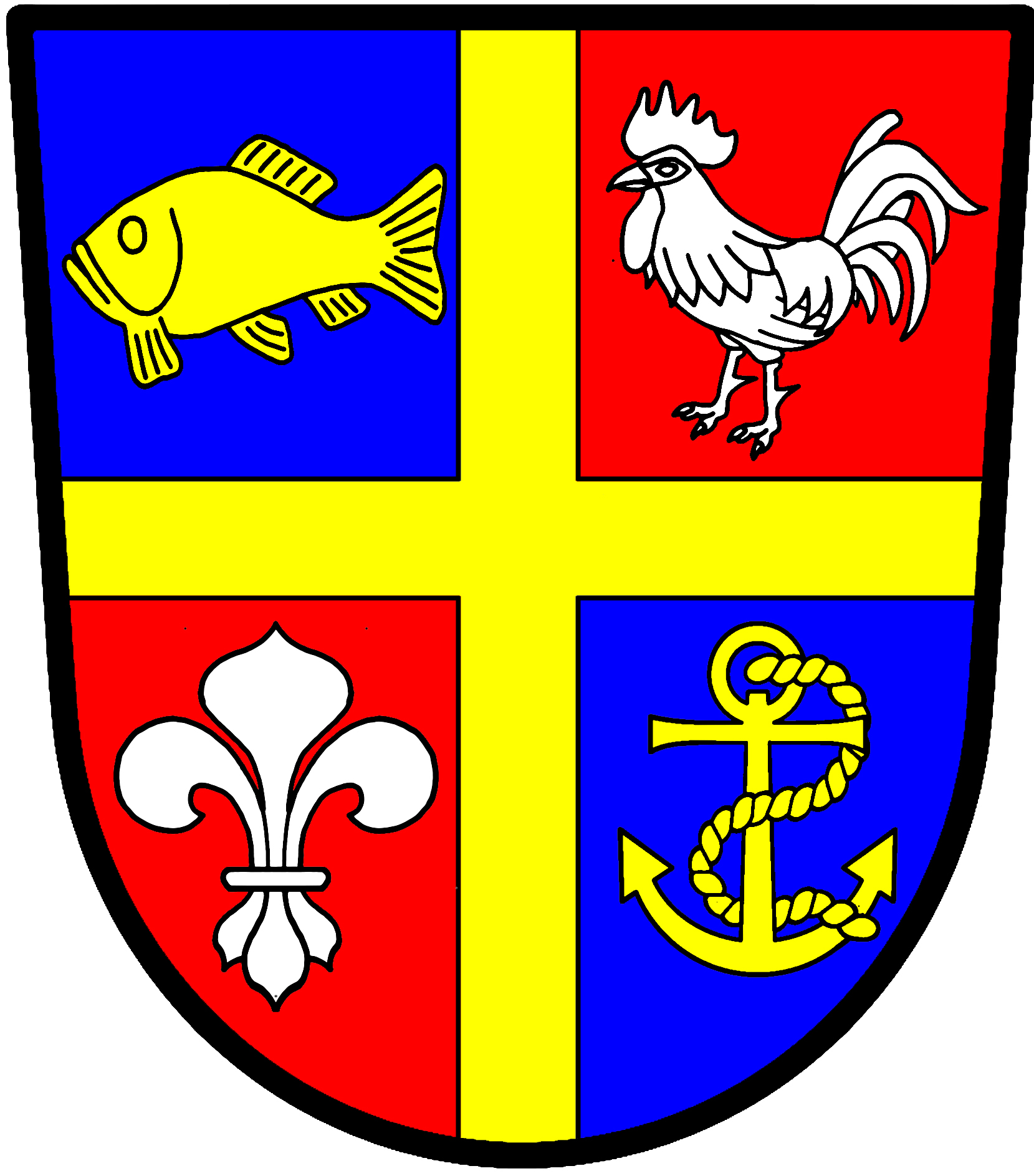
a fillet cross (or cross fillet)—Quarterly, azure and gules; 1. a fish naiant or; 2. a cock argent; 3. a fleur de lis argent; 4, an anchor fouled or; over all a fillet cross or—Port Alfred Municipality, RSA

==== Diminutive of the saltire ====
- fillet saltire, something less than half the width of a saltire
- saltorel, is sometimes said to be a diminutive saltire, but is best thought of simply as a saltire couped, the word being sometimes used when there are three or more (rather like lioncel and eaglet were used at times when there were three or more lions or eagles in a coat)—a 19th-century armorial uses 'saltorels' only once for every ten or eleven 'saltires'. A common charge in Dutch heraldry.
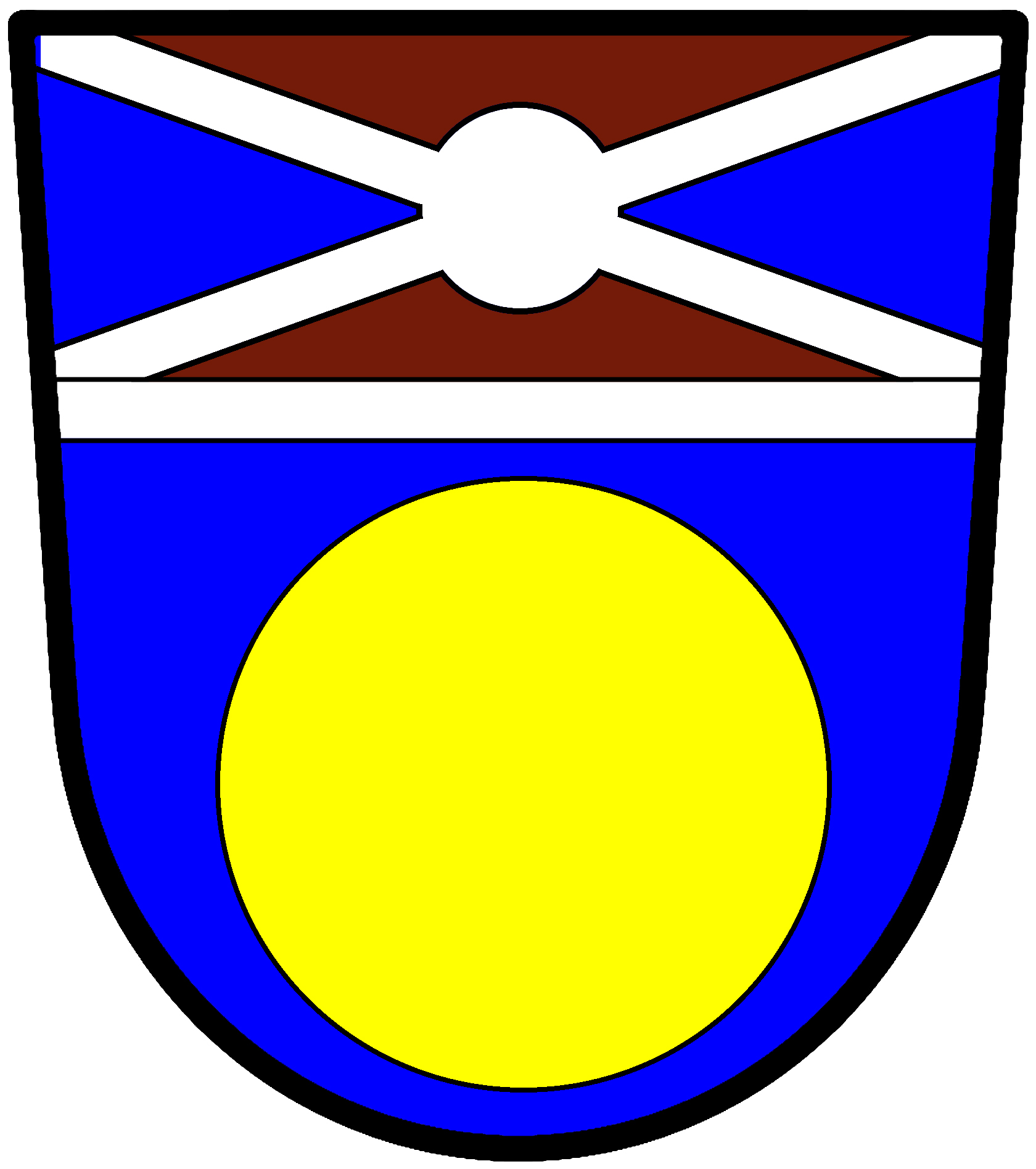
a fillet saltire (or a saltire fillet)—Azure, a bezant; a chief per saltire, murrey and azure, filleted argent, over the partition a fillet saltire nowy, also argent—de Jong, RSA

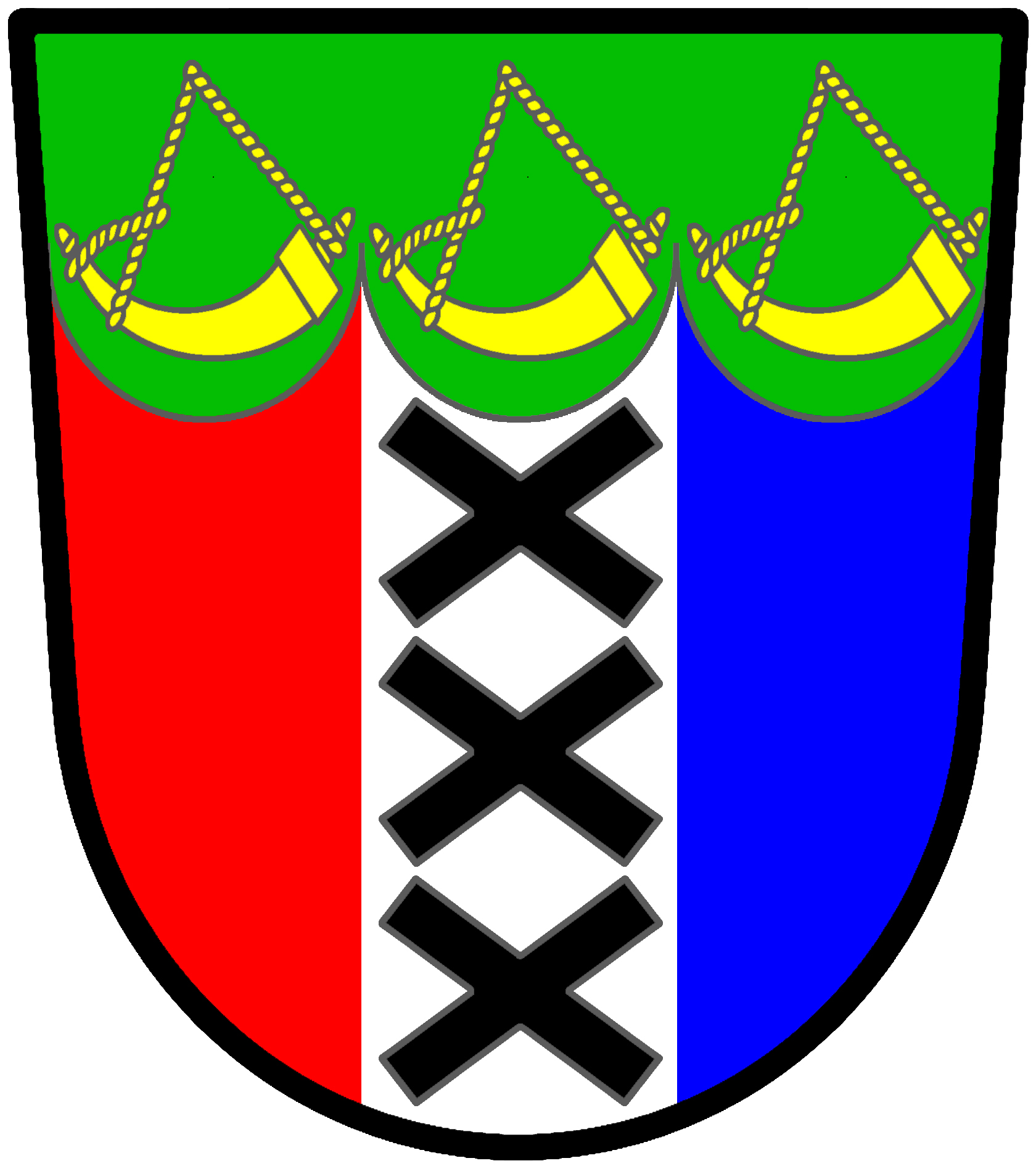
3 saltorels—Tierced per pale, gules, argent and azure, the argent charged with three saltorels in pale, sable; on a chief invected of three pieces vert, three powder horns [stringed] or—Oosthuysen, RSA

=== Cottise and cottising ===
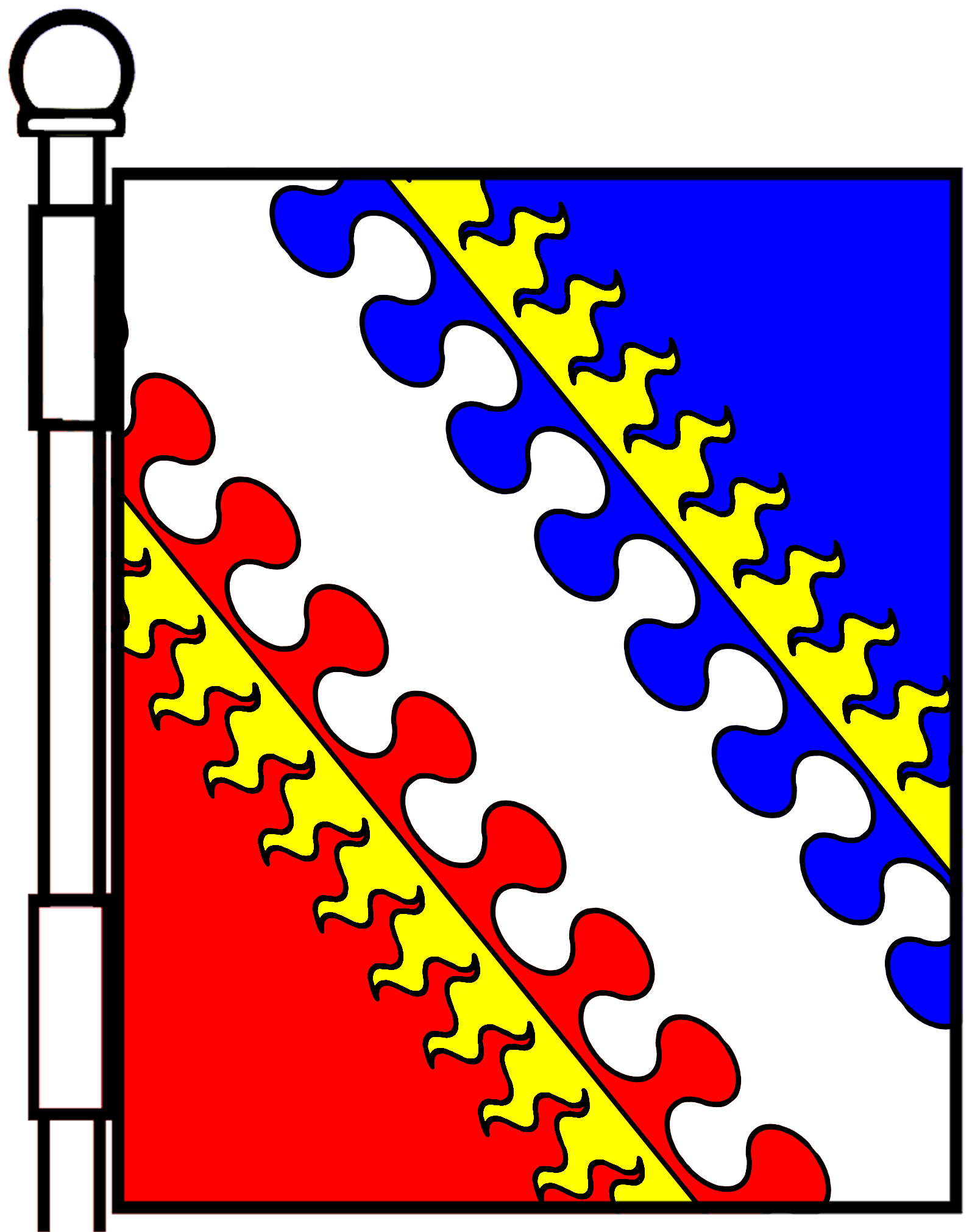
a bend cottised—Per bend azure and gules, a bend nebuly argent cottised rayonny or—Munk, Canada (flag)

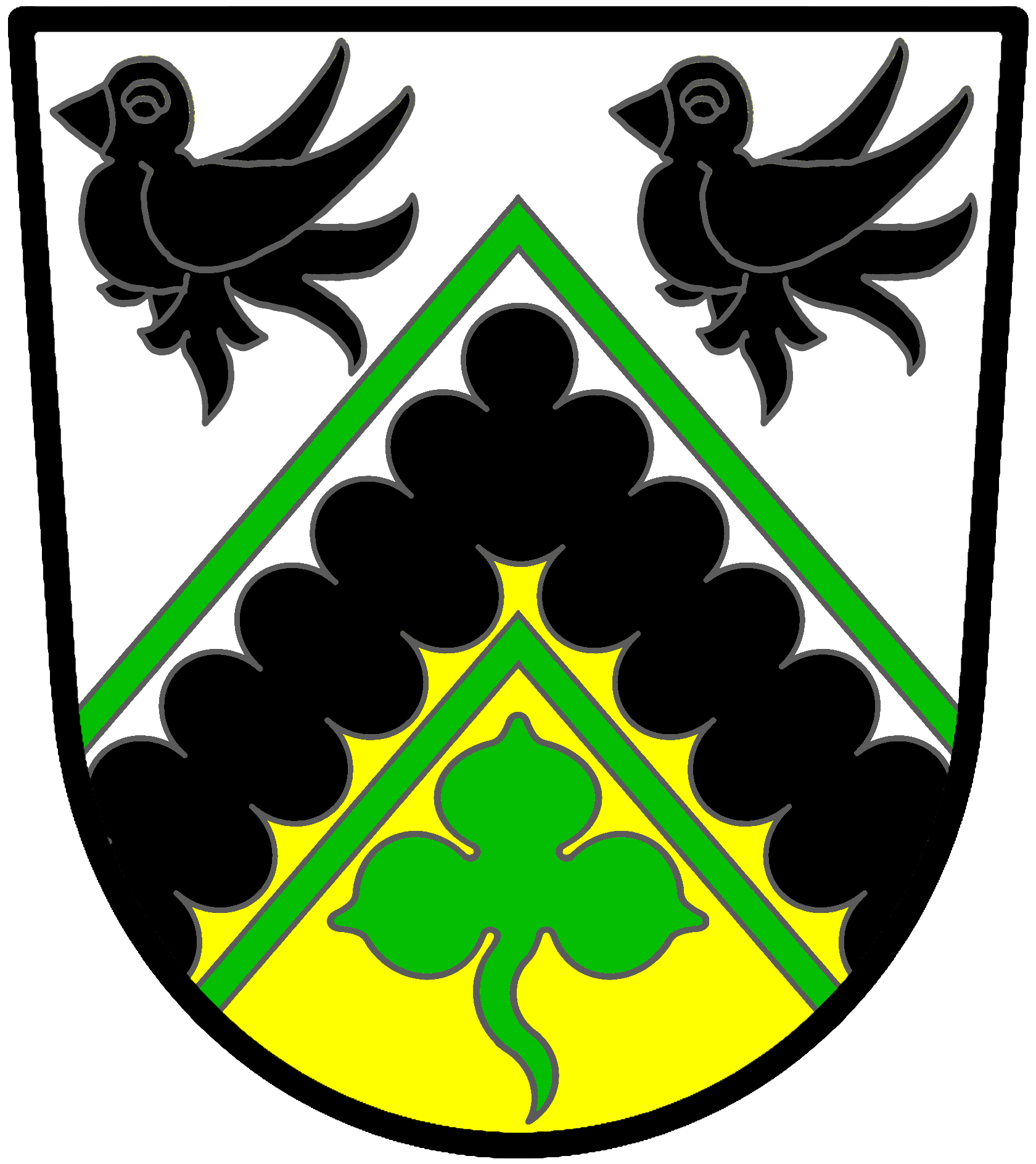
a chevron cottised—Per chevron argent and or, a chevron invected sable, plain cotised vert, between two martlets in chief of the third [sable] and a trefoil slipped in base of the fourth [vert]—Lawson, England

The cottise (the spelling varies—sometimes only one t and sometimes c instead of the s) originated as an alternative name to cost (see above) and so as a diminutive of the bend, most commonly found in pairs on either side of a bend, with the bend being blazoned either as between two cottises or as cottised.

Nowadays cottising is used not just for bends but for practically all the ordinaries (and occasionally collections of charges), and consists in placing the ordinary between two diminutive versions of itself (and occasionally other things). A pale so treated is usually blazoned endorsed and a chevron very occasionally couple closed or between two couple closes. A chief, however, cannot be cottised.

The ordinary and its cottices need not have the same tincture or the same line ornamentation.

Ordinaries very occasionally get cottised by things shaped quite differently from their diminutives—like demi maple leaves.

Occasionally a collection of charges aligned as if on an ordinary—in bend, etc.—is accompanied by cotticing.

=== Voiding, surmounting with another, and fimbriation ===
Any type of charge, but probably most often the ordinaries and subordinaries, can be "voided"; without further description, this means that a hole in the shape of the charge reveals the field behind it. Occasionally the hole is of different tincture or shape (which must then be specified), so that the charge appears to be surcharged with a smaller charge.
