= Betty Werlein Carter =

American publisher, editor and writer

- Born: Betty Werlein; 19 July 1910; New Orleans
- Died: 4 March 2000 (aged 89); New Orleans

Betty Werlein Carter (19 July 1910–4 March 2000) was an American publisher, editor and writer.

== Biography ==
Betty Werlein was born in New Orleans to Elizebeth Thomas Werlein and her husband Philip Werlein III. She was educated in the private Miss McGehee's school, and then went on to attend Tulane University's Sophie Newcomb College in 1927, graduating in 1931. Corinne Carter was a classmate of Carters and it was through her she met her husband Hodding Carter. They dated through college and married in 14 October 1931, settling in Mississippi. During college Carter worked as a reporter and editor for the Tulane Hullabaloo. Hodding worked as a journalist for the Associated Press until he was fired for insubordination. Carter had been a housewife. But at this point the couple returned to Hammond, Louisiana and founded their own newspaper the Hammond Daily Courier which launched on April 18, 1932. Hodding Carter wrote scathingly of Huey P. Long and eventually this spelled the end of the paper. By 1936 they moved to Greenville, Mississippi where they initially started the Delta Star and in 1938 they bought the Daily Democrat-Times. The Delta Democrat-Times, launched on Sept. 1, 1938 and like its predecessor, it was an outspoken paper. Carter was the business and marketing manager of the first papers, writing very few of the editorials. But as they progressed she held positions including features editor, women's editor, and farm page and land use sections editor.

World War II brought Carter to Washington when her husband was serving. He wrote Civilian Defense of the United States and Carter did the research. That work helped her get a job in the Office of War Information as a writer, publicist and researcher. Carter worked to develop radio campaigns. She wrote speeches, coordinated public relations events and published brochures. Some of her fund raising events broke records. She was repeatedly promoted and was involved in large national campaigns.

At the end of the war she returned to their newspaper in Greenville. Hodding Carter didn't want his wife working in the newspaper. She took up social programs and writing for special editions as well as supporting activists during the Civil rights movement. She used her house as a haven for state and national journalists working locally. Carter served on the National Association of Educational Broadcasters. Carter also served on the Mississippi public broadcasting board. She worked to establish free kindergartens in the state and served on the Tulane University President's Council. Carter wrote several books with her husband, for his paper and also as a solo writer. She also wrote for magazines like American Heritage and Smithsonian. Hodding Carter died in 1972 and Hodding Carter III took over the position as editor. When he moved to Washington his brother Phillip Carter took over the role. However it was Carter who had kept the newspaper being published from her husband's death until the family sold it in 1990. In 1994, Carter was selected Public Television Volunteer of the Year for her work in broadcasting. She died in New Orleans 4 March 2000.

== Bibliography ==
- So Great a Good: A History of the Episcopal Church in Louisiana, 1805–1955 (1955)
- Doomed Road of Empire (1963)
- Mules in the Delta (1976)
- The Past As Prelude, New Orleans 1718-1968 (1968) as editors
