= Elizebeth Thomas Werlein =

American preservationist

- Born: 28 January 1883; Bay City, Michigan
- Died: 24 April 1946 (aged 63); New Orleans
- Other names: Elizebeth Thomas; Elizebeth Marie Thomas Werlein; Elizabeth Werlein

Elizebeth Thomas Werlein (28 January 1883 – 24 April 1946) was an American preservationist who is considered responsible for the preservation of the French Quarter of New Orleans. She was also one of the first women to fly in a plane and she was a philanthropist in the city.

== Early life ==
Elizebeth Thomas was born in Bay City, Michigan on 28 January 1883 to dynamite manufacturer Henry Thomas and his first wife, Marie Louise Felton Smith. From a wealthy family Werlein was educated at school in Bay City as well as attending Liggett School in Detroit and the Detroit Conservatory of Music. She studied voice and considered a musical career. Werlein went to Paris to continue her studies at Miss White's School in 1903. Two of her teachers were Antonio Baldelli and Jean de Reszke. However as a socialite, Werlein had many demands on her time. She hunted in Africa and met Empress Eugénie de Montijo and Emperor Franz Joseph and travelled through Vienna and St Petersburg. She had been engaged to marry a Russian prince. When their engagement broke up Werlein moved to London. There she met a new fiancé Viscount Charles Yorke Royston. With him she took up ballooning and they travelled to Belgium in 1908 by balloon. Werlein wore a suit specially designed by the House of Worth of Paris for the trip. Werlein travelled to Louisiana that year and what was supposed to be a short trip changed when she met and married instrument dealer and music publisher Philip Werlein III on 4 August 1908 in Bay City. The couple settled in New Orleans and had four children; Betty, Lorraine, Evelyn, and Philip.

== Career ==
As one of the elite of the city Werlein began a career of working to become completely involved in the social life of New Orleans. Werlein's husband died of influenza in 1917 and she threw herself into ever more activities as well as raising their young children. She founded sewing classes for underprivileged girls in Kingsley House and later became the first president of the Louisiana League of women voters in 1920. She founded and directed the New Orleans Red Cross canteen in 1919 after the end of the First World War. She had worked as a volunteer during the war running the Woman's Committee of the New Orleans Liberty Loan drives, the Woman's Division of the Council of National Defense for New Orleans, and the Landing Fields in Louisiana Committee. Werlein never lost her love of music and was on the board of the New Orleans Philharmonic Society and acting as a host to artists arriving in the city. She gave Nellie Melba a place to recover after she experienced an accident on stage.

Werlein worked against censorship in the twenties with the Motion Picture Producers and Distributors Association. It was her only paid position, when she was the public relations director of the Saenger Theatre as the group worked to forestall legislation by attempting self censorship of their films. Werlein was the president of the Orleans Club and the Quarante Club. But it is primarily for her work in the French Quarter of New Orleans that she is remembered. She fought for the preservation of the buildings and cultural uniqueness of the city from the 1920s. Werlein supported Le Petit Salon, Le Petit Théâtre du Vieux Carré, and Le Quartier Club. She created a booklet showing photographs of the wrought iron railings of the district and fighting to ensure they were not replaced. She was the first president and founder of the Vieux Carré Property Owners Association in 1930. Despite the early lack of support Werlein persuaded the public and officials to recognise her perspective and as a result of her efforts the French Quarter became a valuable part of the national heritage. The American Institute of Architects made her an honorary member in 1942 for her work. Werlein died of cancer in 1946 and was buried in New Orleans. Her home was at 630 Saint Ann Street where there is a bronze memorial to her.
