= Jean Courtois =

Jean Courtois may refer to:

- Jean Courtois (herald) (died 1436), French herald
- Jean Courtois (composer) (fl. 1530–1545), Franco-Flemish composer
- Jean-Pierre Courtois (17th century), French painter and father of painters Jacques, Guillaume and Jean-François Courtois
- Jean-Patrick Courtois (born 1951), member of the Senate of France
- Jean-Philippe Courtois, president of Microsoft International

== See also ==
- Courtois (disambiguation)
