= Curtois =

Curtois is a surname and occasional given name. Notable people with this name include:

- Ella Rose Curtois (1860–1944), British sculptor
- Mary Henrietta Dering Curtois (1854–1928), British artist
- John Curtois Howard (1887–1970), English magistrate and Chief Justice of Ceylon

== See also ==
- Courtois (disambiguation)
- Curtis
