= Copper (color) =

Orange brown color

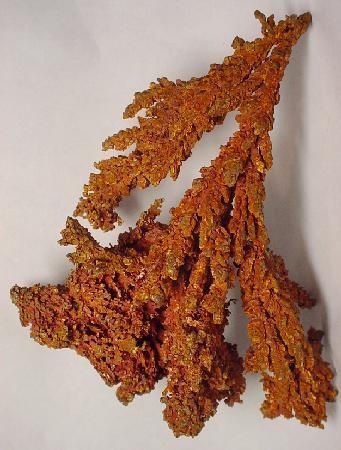
- A dendritic specimen of native copper

Color coordinates
- Hex triplet: #B87333
- sRGB^{B} (r, g, b): (184, 115, 51)
- HSV (h, s, v): (29°, 72%, 72%)
- CIELCh_{uv} (L, C, h): (55, 70, 39°)
- Source: 99colors.net/Maerz and Paul
- ISCC–NBS descriptor: Brownish orange
- B: Normalized to [0–255] (byte)

Copper is a reddish brown color that resembles the metal copper. The first recorded use of copper as a color name in English was in 1594.

== Variations of copper ==
=== Pale copper ===
Pale Copper

Color coordinates
- Hex triplet: #DA8A67
- sRGB^{B} (r, g, b): (218, 138, 103)
- HSV (h, s, v): (18°, 53%, 85%)
- CIELCh_{uv} (L, C, h): (65, 68, 30°)
- Source: Crayola
- ISCC–NBS descriptor: Moderate orange
- B: Normalized to [0–255] (byte)

At right is displayed pale tone of copper that is called copper in Crayola crayons. This color was formulated by Crayola in 1903.

=== Copper red ===
Copper Red

Color coordinates
- Hex triplet: #CB6D51
- sRGB^{B} (r, g, b): (203, 109, 81)
- HSV (h, s, v): (14°, 60%, 80%)
- CIELCh_{uv} (L, C, h): (56, 78, 23°)
- Source: ISCC-NBS
- ISCC–NBS descriptor: Moderate reddish orange
- B: Normalized to [0–255] (byte)

At right is displayed the color copper red.

The first recorded use of copper red as a color name in English was in 1590.

=== Copper penny ===
Copper Penny

Color coordinates
- Hex triplet: #AD6F69
- sRGB^{B} (r, g, b): (173, 111, 105)
- HSV (h, s, v): (5°, 39%, 68%)
- CIELCh_{uv} (L, C, h): (53, 44, 17°)
- Source: Crayola
- ISCC–NBS descriptor: Grayish red
- B: Normalized to [0–255] (byte)

At right is displayed the color copper penny.

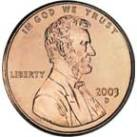
A US 2003 penny featuring Lincoln

Copper penny is one of the colors in the special set of metallic Crayola crayons called Silver Swirls, the colors of which were formulated by Crayola in 1990.

=== Copper rose ===
Copper rose

Color coordinates
- Hex triplet: #996666
- sRGB^{B} (r, g, b): (153, 102, 102)
- HSV (h, s, v): (0°, 33%, 60%)
- CIELCh_{uv} (L, C, h): (49, 34, 12°)
- Source: 99colors.net
- ISCC–NBS descriptor: Grayish red
- B: Normalized to [0–255] (byte)

At right is displayed the color copper rose.

The first recorded use of copper rose as a color name in English was in 1928.

== Copper in nature ==
Plants

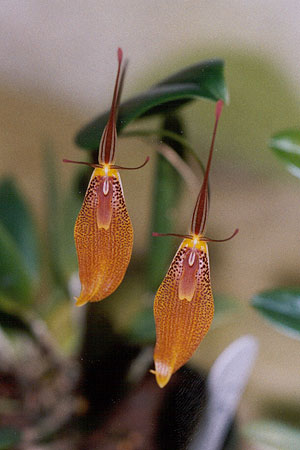
- Copper restrepia orchids
  The Copper-colored Restrepia is an orchid native to Colombia.

Snakes

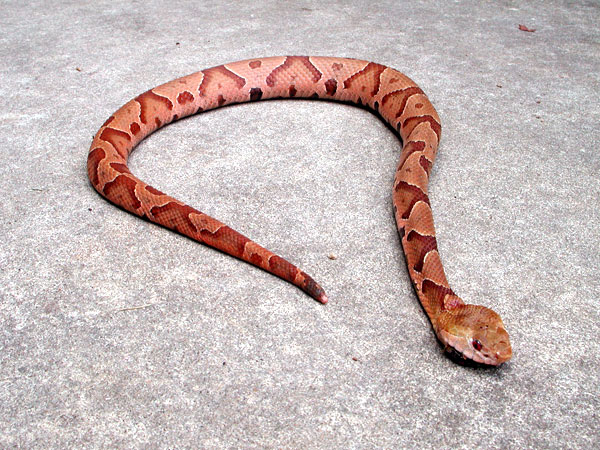
- Southern copperhead
  Copperhead snakes (such as Trigonocephalus contortrix) are so named for the coloration found between their eyes.

== Copper in culture ==
=== Heraldry ===
- Copper (heraldry) – Copper has been used in heraldry as a metal tincture since the late 20th Century, so far mostly in Canada.

=== Sports ===
- The Zambia national football team are nicknamed the Chipolopolo, which translates to "Copper Bullets" and typically features the color in its uniforms.

== See also ==
- List of colors
