= Courbois =

Courbois is a surname. Notable people with the surname include:

- Kitty Courbois (born 1937), Dutch actress
- Philippe Courbois (active 1710–28), French Baroque composer
- Pierre Courbois (born 1940), Dutch jazz-drummer, bandleader, and composer

== See also ==
- Courtois (disambiguation)
