= Tincture (heraldry) =

Metal, colour, or fur used in heraldic design

The metals and common colours of heraldry. One system of hatching is shown at right.

Tinctures are the colours, metals, and furs used in heraldry. There are nine tinctures in common use: two metals, five colours, and two furs. The metals are or (gold or yellow) and argent (silver or white); the colours gules (red), azure (blue), vert (green), sable (black), and purpure (purple); and the furs ermine, which is derived from the winter fur of a stoat, and vair, which is derived from the fur of a red squirrel. The use of other tinctures varies depending on the time period and heraldic tradition in question.

Where the tinctures are not depicted in full colour, they may be represented using one of several systems of hatching, in which each tincture is assigned a distinct pattern; or tricking, in which each tincture is designated by a letter or abbreviation.

Historically, particularly between the fifteenth and seventeenth centuries, the tinctures were sometimes associated with the planets, precious stones, virtues, and elements. However, in contemporary heraldry they are not assigned any particular meaning.

== Development and history ==
The use of tinctures dates back to the formative period of European heraldry in the twelfth and thirteenth centuries. The range of tinctures and the manner of depicting and describing them has evolved over time, as new variations and practices have developed. The earliest surviving coloured heraldic illustrations, from the mid-thirteenth century, show the use of the two metals, five colours, and two furs. Since that time, the great majority of heraldic art has employed these nine tinctures.

The distinction between colours and metals is not made in many medieval heraldic treatises, including the Anglo-Norman De Heraudie, which has been dated to between 1280 and 1300 or 1341–45, the Italian Tractatus de Insigniis et Armis, published in 1358, the Tractatus de Armis, which dates from shortly after 1394, or the mid-fifteenth century Bradfer-Lawrence Roll. In addition, while De Heraudie and the Bradfer-Lawrence list the seven common metals and colours of contemporary heraldry, the Tractatus de Insigniis combines red and purple and omits green, and the Tractatus de Armis omits purple.

A fourteenth-century English treatise, possibly by the same author as the Tractatus de Armis, does make the distinction between colours and metals and lists the seven in contemporary use in addition to the colour tawny, which it states is used only in France and the Holy Roman Empire. The Accedence of Armory, written by Gerard Legh in 1562, also distinguishes between colours and metals, listing the seven in contemporary use as well as proper, the natural colour of any animal, bird, or herb. Legh rejects tawny as non-existent and sanguine or murrey, a reddish-brown tincture, as a mistake for purpure.

The tinctures are not standardised, with any shade being acceptable so long as it cannot be confused with another tincture. Purpure, in particular, has been depicted in a range of shades; many grants by the Tudor officer of arms Thomas Wriothesley, for example, use for purpure a reddish-purple shade which would now be described as murrey.

Over time, variations on these basic tinctures were developed, particularly with respect to the furs. Authorities differ as to whether these variations should be considered separate tinctures, or merely varieties of existing ones. Two additional colours appeared, and were generally accepted by heraldic writers, although they remained scarce, and were eventually termed stains, from the belief that they were used to signify some dishonour on the part of the bearer. Other colours have appeared occasionally since the eighteenth century, especially in continental heraldry, but their use is infrequent, and they have never been regarded as particularly heraldic, or numbered among the tinctures that form the basis of heraldic design.

=== Frequency and national variants ===
A diagram of various tinctures in heraldry. First row: metals; second row: colours; third row: stains; fourth row: non-traditional tinctures

The frequency with which different tinctures have been used over time has been much observed, but little studied. There are some general trends of note, both with respect to the passage of time, and noted preferences from one region to another.

In medieval heraldry, gules was by far the most common tincture, followed by the metals argent and or, at least one of which necessarily appeared on the majority of arms (see below). Among the colours, sable was the second most common, followed by azure. Vert, although present from the formative period of heraldic design, was relatively scarce. Over time, the popularity of azure increased above that of sable, while gules, still the most common, became less dominant. A survey of French arms granted during the seventeenth century reveals a distinct split between the trends for the arms granted to nobles and commoners. Among nobles, gules remained the most common tincture, closely followed by or, then by argent and azure at nearly equal levels; sable was a very distant fifth choice, while vert remained scarce. Among commoners, azure was easily the most common tincture, followed by or, and only then by gules, argent, and sable, which was used more by commoners than among the nobility; vert, however, was even scarcer in common arms. Purpure is so scarce in French heraldry that some authorities do not regard it as a "real heraldic tincture".

On the whole, French heraldry is known for its use of azure and or, while English heraldry is characterised by heavy use of gules and argent, and unlike French heraldry, it has always made regular use of vert, and occasional, if not extensive, use of purpure.

German heraldry is known for its extensive use of or and sable. German and Nordic heraldry rarely make use of purpure or ermine, except in mantling, pavilions, and the lining of crowns and caps. In fact, furs occur infrequently in German and Nordic heraldry.

== Tinctures ==
Heraldic tinctures (excluding furs)
Class		Metals		Colours					Stains		
Name		Argent	Or	Gules	Sable	Azure	Vert	Purpure	Murrey	Sanguine	Tenné
Tincture											
Non-heraldic equivalent		Silver/White	Gold/Yellow	Red	Black	Blue	Green	Purple	Mulberry	Blood red	Tawny
Monochromatic designations	Hatching										
Monochromatic designations	Tricking abbr.	ar.	o.	gu.	s., sa.	az., bl., b.	vt., v.	purp., pu., p.	m.	♌︎	♌︎

Table of the tinctures and furs

The colours and patterns of the heraldic palette are divided into three groups, usually known as metals, colours, and furs.

=== Metals ===
The metals are or and argent, representing gold and silver, respectively, although in practice they are often depicted as yellow and white.

Or (Ger. Gelb, Gold, or golden) derives its name from the French or, "gold". It may be depicted using either yellow or metallic gold, at the artist's discretion; "yellow" has no separate existence in heraldry, and is never used to represent any tincture other than or.

Argent (Ger. Weiß, Weiss, Silber, or silbern) is similarly derived from the French argent, "silver". Although sometimes depicted as metallic silver or faint grey, it is more often represented by white, in part because of the tendency for silver paint to oxidize and darken over time, (Note: At one point, aluminum paint was used for argent, as it was more resistant to oxidation; but its effect also faded with age.) and in part because of the pleasing effect of white against a contrasting colour. Notwithstanding the widespread use of white for argent, the heraldist Arthur Charles Fox-Davies suggested the existence of white as a distinct heraldic colour. The blazon of the coat of arms of Pope Leo XIV is also notable for its rare distinction between the metal argent and the colour "white".

==== Other metals ====
Very rarely, other metals are distinguished, as copper in Cypriot and Canadian heraldry and buff (from buff leather) in American military heraldry.

=== Colours ===
The five common colours in heraldry are gules, or red; sable, or black; azure, or blue; vert, or green; and purpure, or purple.

Gules (Fr. gueules, Ger. Rot) is of uncertain derivation; outside of the heraldic context, the modern French word refers to the mouth of an animal.

Sable (Ger. Schwarz) is named for a type of marten, known for its dark, luxuriant fur. (Note: Despite the origin of the name, sable is always regarded as a colour, rather than a fur.)

Azure (Fr. azur or bleu, Ger. Blau) comes through the Arabic lāzaward, from the Persian lāžavard both referring to the blue mineral lapis lazuli, used to produce blue pigments.

Vert (Fr. vert or sinople, Ger. Grün) is from Latin viridis, "green". The alternative name in French, sinople, is derived from the ancient city of Sinope in Asia Minor (Turkey), which was famous for its pigments.

Purpure (Fr. purpure or pourpre, Ger. Purpur) is from Latin purpura, in turn from Greek porphyra, the dye known as Tyrian purple. This expensive dye, known from antiquity, produced a much redder purple than the modern heraldic colour; and in fact earlier depictions of purpure are far redder than recent ones. As a heraldic colour, purpure may have originated as a variation of gules.

==== Stains ====
Three more tinctures eventually made their way into the heraldic literature: sanguine, a blood red, murrey, a dark red or mulberry colour; and tenné, an orange or dark yellow to brownish colour. These were termed "stains" by some of the more influential heraldic writers and supposed to represent some sort of dishonour on the part of the bearer, but there is no evidence that they were ever used for this purpose and they probably originated as variations on existing colours.. Nevertheless, the belief that they represented stains upon the honour of an armiger prevented them from being widely used, and it is only in recent times that they have begun to appear on an occasional basis.

Sanguine from the Latin sanguineus, "blood red", one the so-called "stains" in British armory, is a dark blood red between gules and purpure in hue. It probably originated as a mere variation of red and may in fact represent the original hue of purpure, which is now treated as a much bluer colour than when it first appeared in heraldry. It was long shunned in the belief that it represented some dishonour on the part of the bearer. (Note: A rare exception of sanguine in older heraldry, cited by Woodward and Burnett, was the arms of the Clayhills of Invergowrie: per bend sanguine and vert, two greyhounds courant bendways argent.)

Murrey, from the Greek morum, "mulberry", it has found some use in the twentieth and twenty-first centuries. (Note: For instance, the arms of Lewes Old Grammar School, granted October 25, 2012: Murrey within an Orle of eight Crosses crosslet Argent a Lion rampant Or holding in the forepaws a Book bound Azure the spine and the edges of the pages Gold and those of Woolf, granted October 2, 2015: Murrey a Snow Wolf's Head erased proper on a Chief Argent a Boar's Head coped at the neck between two Fleurs de Lys Azure.) Murrey is also the official colour of the Order of the Bath ribbon.

Tenné or tenny or tawny, from Latin tannare, "to tan". It is most often depicted as orange, but sometimes as tawny yellow or brown. In earlier times it was occasionally used in continental heraldry, but in England largely confined to livery.

==== Other colours ====
In specific contexts, additional other colours are sometimes distinguished. Some examples include bleu celeste (sky blue), brunâtre (brownish), cendrée (ashen grey), and carnation (flesh) in Continental heraldry; rose (pink) in Canadian heraldry; orange in Dutch heraldry; and ochre in South African heraldry. Barnes, England, was granted a coat of arms in 1932 that distinguished its crossed oars as specifically dark blue and light blue to represent the specific colours of the Oxford and Cambridge teams in the Boat Race.

=== Furs ===
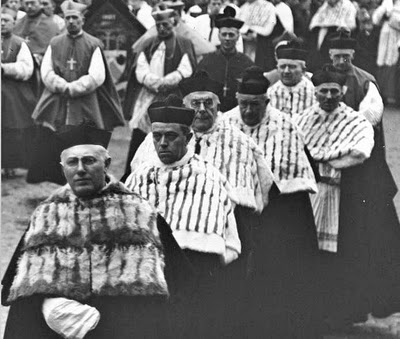
Canons from the chapter of Bruges, solemn winterdress in fur

The use of heraldic furs alongside the metals and colours dates to the beginning of the art. In this earliest period, there were only two furs, ermine and vair. (Note: Although sable is also named after the dark pelt of a type of marten, it has always been regarded as a colour, rather than a fur.) Ermine represents the fur of the stoat, a type of weasel, in its white winter coat, when it is called an ermine. Vair represents the winter coat of the red squirrel, which is blue-grey above and white below. These furs were commonly used to line the cloaks and robes of the nobility. Both ermine and vair give the appearance of being a combination of metal and colour, but in heraldic convention they are considered a separate class of tincture that is neither metal nor colour. Over time, several variations of ermine and vair have appeared, together with three additional furs typically encountered in continental heraldry, known as plumeté, papelonné, and kürsch, the origins of which are more mysterious, but which probably began as variations of vair.

==== Ermine ====
Ermine

Ermine (Fr. hermine, Ger. hermelin) is normally depicted as a white field powdered with black spots, known as "ermine spots", representing the ermine's black tail. The use of white instead of silver is normal, even when silver is available, since this is how the fur naturally appears; but occasionally silver is used to depict ermine. There is considerable variation in the shape of ermine spots; in the oldest depictions, they were drawn realistically, as long, tapering points; in modern times they are typically drawn as arrowheads, usually topped by three small dots.

==== Vair ====
Vair

Vair (Ger. Feh) derives its name from Latin varius, "variegated". It is usually depicted as a series of alternating shapes, conventionally known as panes or "vair bells", of argent and azure, arranged in horizontal rows, so that the panes of one tincture form the upper part of the row, while those of the opposite tincture are on the bottom. Succeeding rows are staggered, so that the bases of the panes making up each row are opposite those of the other tincture in the rows above and below. As with ermine, the argent panes may be depicted as either white or silver; silver is used more often with vair than with ermine, but the natural fur is white.

When the pattern of vair is used with other colours, the field is termed vairé or vairy (Note: Sometimes, in older authorities, varry or verry.) of the tinctures used. Normally vairé consists of one metal and one colour, although ermine or one of its variants is sometimes used, with an ermine spot appearing in each pane of that tincture. Vairé of four colours (Ger. Buntfeh, "gay-coloured" or "checked vair") is also known, usually consisting of two metals and two colours.

Several variant shapes exist, of which the most common is known as potent (Note: Occasionally, varry cuppy.) (Ger. Sturzkrückenfeh, "upside-down crutch vair"). In this form, the familiar "vair bell" is replaced by a T-shaped figure, known as a "potent" due to its resemblance to a crutch. Other furs sometimes encountered in continental heraldry, which are thought to be derived from vair, include plumeté or plumetty and papelonné or papellony. In plumeté, the panes are depicted as feathers; in papelonné they are depicted as scales, resembling those of a butterfly's wings (whence the name is derived). These can be modified with the colour, arrangement, and size variants of vair, though those variants are much less common. In German heraldry there is also a fur known as Kürsch, or "vair bellies", consisting of panes depicted hairy and brown. Here the phrase "vair bellies" may be a misnomer, as the belly of the red squirrel is always white, although its summer coat is indeed reddish brown.

Potent

Plumeté or and sable

Gules, papelonné or

Kürsch

=== Other tinctures ===
Several other tinctures are very occasionally encountered. Most of these (Carnation being a prominent exception) are vanishingly rare, often known to occur one or a handful of times in the several million arms that have historically existed.

- Amaranth or columbine, a strong violet-red, found in one grant of arms to a Bohemian knight in 1701
- Aurore, representing the colour of dawn, typically somewhere between peach and pink, attested in the torse and mantling of Poligny (Note: Poligny (Franche-Comté) De gueules, au chevron d'argent. Bourlet d'argent et de couleur aurore. Cimier: le faîte d'une tour ronde d'argent, couverte en pointe et girouettée du même. Lambrequin: d'argent et de couleur aurore. (Johannes Rietstap, Armorial général, contenant la description des armoiries des familles nobles et patriciennes de l'Europe, précédé d'un dictionnaire des termes du blason).)
- Bleu-céleste or bleu de ciel, a sky blue colour intended to be lighter than azure (Note: Cinti (now Cini) of Florence: Per pale azure and bleu-celeste an estoile counter changed.)
- Brunâtre (Ger. Braun), or Brown, used very occasionally in German heraldry. The Miners Royal Adventurers company includes a chief brown; one also finds monks habited brown.
- Carnation, routinely used in French heraldry as a synonym for "proper, and light-skinned" when describing human skin (also decorously implying that the charge has at least some of their skin exposed). The arms of Hohenstein-Ernstthal use fleischfarbene in the same way and the arms of Ilbury render this as flesh-colour, though these are not used routinely in the way that carnation is in French.
  - Pink has been used at least once in English heraldry for the same purpose (Note: Darling (London). Az. guttée d'or, on a fesse of the last three crosses crosslet fitchée gu. Crest-A female figure ppr. habited in a loose robe ar. the body pink, flowing round her a robe az. holding in the dexter hand a cross crosslet fitchée gu. in the sinister a book ppr. (Burke, General Armory of England, Scotland and Ireland.). Pink has also been used in German military heraldry
- Cendrée, or "ash-colour" (Note: Aschau of Bavaria: Cendrée, a mount of three coupeaux in base, or. Gwilt of South Wales: Argent, a lion rampant sable, the head, paws, and half of the tail ash colour.).
- Dun, used very rarely in English heraldry to describe horses (Note: Horsenail( Worvill, co. Berks; granted 17 Feb. 1740): Ar. a cross dovetailed betw. four mullets az. Crest- Out of a mural crown ar. a horse's head, dun colour, maned sa. gorged with a collar dovetailed az. (Burke, General Armory of England, Scotland and Ireland).)
  - Bay, used likewise (Note: Shekel (Pebworth, co. Worcester). Ar. a horse pass. bay betw. two tilting - spears in fesse sa. (Burke, General Armory of England, Scotland and Ireland).)
- Eisenfarbe, or iron-colour, found in German heraldry. It's used exclusively for small metallic details on charges or the helmet, in accordance with German heraldic conventions.
  - Stahlfarbe or steel colour is used a similar amount and in a very similar way (Note: Schedler in R. eine schräggestellte g. Stange, an jedem Ende ein stahlfarbenes Wurfeisen. (J. Siebmachers grosses und allgemeines Wappenbuch)). "Steel-blue" is found in British military insignia.
  - Kupferfarbe or copper colour is used for copper objects and also in one case to describe skin tone: "a copper-coloured face" (Note: Porsch in G. ein kupferfarbenes Gesicht (haarlos) von dem ringsum # Strahlen ausgehen. (J. Siebmachers grosses und allgemeines Wappenbuch))
  - Similarly, Bronzée, or bronze-colour found at least once in Polish heraldry (Note: Janina (Pologne)D'or, à un bouclier ovale de pourpre, ou, de gueules à un bouclier ovale de couleur bronzée. Casque couronné. Cimier: une queue de paon au naturel. (Johannes Rietstap, Armorial général, contenant la description des armoiries des familles nobles et patriciennes de l'Europe, précédé d'un dictionnaire des termes du blason).) and in German heraldry (Note: 'Krug de Nidd — Prusse, Saxe, Hesse - (Nob. du St-Empire, 1703) D'or, à une étoile à six rais d'azur, chaque rai représenté en relief, le dos du relief de chaque rai aplati en forme de filet d'argent, se rétrécissant vers l'extrémité de chaque rai, l'étoile ch. en coeur d'une pignate ou cruche sans anses, de couleur bronzée. Casque couronné. Cimier: un vol, d'or et de sable, l'aile de sable ch. de deux étoiles accostées d'or. (Johannes Rietstap, Armorial général, contenant la description des armoiries des familles nobles et patriciennes de l'Europe, précédé d'un dictionnaire des termes du blason).)
- Grisâtre ("grey-ish") found a number of times in German heraldry (Note: Hayena (Ostfrise): D'argent, au lion rampant de couleur grisâtre. Cimier: la tête du lion. (Johannes Rietstap, Armorial général, contenant la description des armoiries des familles nobles et patriciennes de l'Europe, précédé d'un dictionnaire des termes du blason).) and Low Countries heraldry (Note: Boone (de) van Ytegem (Brabant): D'or, à un coq hardi de couleur grisâtre, crêté et barbé de gueules, ledit coq contourné sur une terrasse de sinople. (Johannes Rietstap, Armorial général, contenant la description des armoiries des familles nobles et patriciennes de l'Europe, précédé d'un dictionnaire des termes du blason)).
- Holzfarbe or wood colour is used in German heraldry like Eisenfarbe and Stahlfarbe, but for wooden objects (Note: Eckhelsbach: S. r. geteilt, oben ein mit zwei Bäumen besetzter, schwebender gr. Hügel, mit torartiger Öffnung, aus welcher ein Wasser schräg herabfließt; unten ein lediger, bis an den oberen Schildrand reichender holzfarbener Felsen. (J. Siebmachers grosses und allgemeines Wappenbuch))
- Orange, often referred to by its French form Orangé to distinguish it from the fruit, rarely used other than in Catalan, South African, French municipal and American military heraldry.
- Rougeâtre (reddish) (Note: Blanther (Autriche) - (Chevaliers, 18 avril 1883): Parti, au 1, d'or, à un rocher au naturel, sommé d'une tour de couleur rougeâtre à double rang de créneaux, ouverte de sable, au 2, d'azur, à une étoile d'or. Deux casques couronnés. Cimiers: 1° un lion issant et contourné d'or, tenant une épée; 2° un vol à l'antique, l'aile de derrière d'or plein, l'aile de devant d'azur ch. d'une étoile d'or. Lambrequin: d'or et d'azur. (Johannes Rietstap, Armorial général, contenant la description des armoiries des familles nobles et patriciennes de l'Europe, précédé d'un dictionnaire des termes du blason).)
- Russet, used to tincture monks' robes (Note: Sturton (Narborowe, co. Leicester; EDWARD STURTON, Visit. Leicester, 1619, fourth son of THOMAS STURTON, Esq., of Sturton, co. Notts). \[…\] Crest A demi friar vested russet ppr. skirted gu. cowled also ppr. in the dexter hand a discipline of three thongs, and in the sinister a church or. Another Crest- An arm couped at the elbow erect, vested per pale or and gu. in the hand ppr. a griffin's head erased az. (Burke, General Armory of England, Scotland and Ireland).)
  - Similarly, Gris is found several times in French heraldry for a similar purpose. (Note: Châteaurenard (Provence) - La confrérie des pénitents gris, du lieu de Châteaurenard, sous le titre de l'adoration de la croix D'or, à une croix haussée de sable, le Christ de carnation, couvert d'argent et en pointe de deux hommes affublés de leurs habits de pénitents de couleur grise, à genoux, affrontés, et ayant les mains jointes et élevées, le tout posé sur une terrasse de sinople. (Charles-René d'Hozier, Armorial Géneral de France)). It appears as Grey/Gray in English. The arms of the Barons Stourton include a monk habited grey. More recently it has been used in military heraldry in the UK and the US.
  - Crimson, used to tincture clothing (Note: Howe (Lord Chedworth; extinct 1804, created 1741). Or, a fess betw.three wolves' heads couped sa. a crescent for diff. Crest-A dexter arm in armour erased below the elbow, lying fessways, and holding in the hand a scymitar all ppr. pommel and hilt or, pierced through a boar's head couped sa. Supporters-Dexter, a lion ar. pellettée, armed and langued gu.; sinister, an angel ppr. face in profile, hair brownish, habited crimson, under garments az. wings ar. pinioned of the fourth. Motto-Justus et propositi tenax. (Burke, General Armory of England, Scotland and Ireland).)
- Steinfarbe or stone colour is used like Eisenfarbe and Stahlfarbe, exclusively to tincture stone objects (Note: Colte: In S. eine perspektivische {über Eck gesehene}, steinfarbene Pyramide von 16 Stufen; die mittlere untere Ecke ruht auf einem n. Schlangenkopfe, die rechte auf dem Rücken eines linksgekehrten stehenden r. Bracken und die linke auf dem eines b.-gezungten, b.-gewaffneten, stehenden, r. Löwen. (J. Siebmachers grosses und allgemeines Wappenbuch))
- Tabby, used rarely in English heraldry (Note: Dawson (Edwardston Hall, co. Suffolk). Az. a chev. erm. betw. three arrows or, feathered and barbed ar. on a chief of the last three Cornish choughs ppr. a canton gu. charged with a mullet of the third. Quartering gu. a cross patoncée betw. four cinquefoils or, for MANNING. Crest— A cat's head erased guard. tabby, in the mouth a rat ppr. Motto-Vita via virtus. (Burke, General Armory of England, Scotland and Ireland).)
- Wasserfarbe or coloured as water, is used for a number of fields, not primarily for objects (Note: Lackhner: Von R. und Wasserfarbe geteilt, auf dem Wasser eine zweigeschwänzte Meerjungfrau (Melusine), mit leibfarbigem Rock, g. Haar. (J. Siebmachers grosses und allgemeines Wappenbuch))
- Yellowish French: jaunâtre Dutch: geelachtig as well as Reddish French: rougeâtre Dutch: roodachtigin the arms of von Bönninghausen (Note: Onder eene lucht met avondrood, van boven roodachtig en beneden geelachtig, met eene donkere wolk aan de linkerzijde van het schild betrokken, een kalm water waarin zich het avondrood weerspiegelt en waaruit te halverlijve een goud-gekroonde snoek in natuurlijke kleur schuinrechts oprijst. (J-B Rieststap, De Wapens van den tegenwoordigen en den vroegeren Nederlandschen Adel))

==== Light and dark variations ====
There is a substantial — though each may be rarely used — variety of tinctures that take the form of a dark or light specification of either a standard tincture or a nonstandard hue. In some cases this is structurally-required; for example the arms of Pelichy have a field vert and on it roses with their stems "a darker shade of vert than the shield. (Note: Pelichy Flandre: De sinople, à la fasce d'argent, acc. de trois roses d'or, tigées et feuillées d'un sinople plus foncé que le champ, les 2 en chef posées en bande et en barre, celle en pointe posée en bande. (J-B Rietstap, Armorial général, contenant la description des armoiries des familles nobles et patriciennes de l'Europe, précédé d'un dictionnaire des termes du blason))

- Dark Green German: dunkelgrün French: sinople/vert foncé and Light Green German: hellgrün appear together on the canting arms of Groeneveld "green-field" (Note: In hellgrünem \[sic!\] Felde einen s. Balken, begleitet von 3 dunkelgrünen \[also gr. auf gr. !\] Kleeblättern, 2 u. 1 — "light green \[sic!\] a fess argent between three dark-green \[thus, vert on vert !\] trefoils 2&1" (J. Siebmachers grosses und allgemeines Wappenbuch)) (Note: Groenevelt (van) Brabant, Ostfrise - (Nob. du St.-Empire, 5 déc. 1786) De sinople, à la fasce d'argent, acc. de trois trèfles d'un sinople plus foncé ou moins foncé que le champ. — "Vert a fess argent between three trefoils of a Vert either darker or less dark than the field" (J-B Rietstap, Armorial général, contenant la description des armoiries des familles nobles et patriciennes de l'Europe, précédé d'un dictionnaire des termes du blason))
- Green-Brown Dutch: groenbruin in the arms of Hope (Note: Helmteeken: een aardbol met de meridianen en parallellen,vertoonende de werelddeelen van het oostelijk halfrond, de kusten met lichtrood afgezet en de zeeën van eene groenbruine kleur; de bol in den rechter bovenhoek ingescheurd, en overtopt door een regenboog, wiens beide uiteinden op wolken rusten, alles in natuurlijke kleur. (J-B Rieststap, De Wapens van den tegenwoordigen en den vroegeren Nederlandschen Adel))
- Dark Red German: dunkelrot French: geules/rouge foncé in the arms of Barwitz (Note: in G. ein s. beiderseits r. eingefasster Querbalken oben eine 'dunkelrote' große Rose ohne Stengel schwebend. (J. Siebmachers grosses und allgemeines Wappenbuch)) and in the former arms of Bulgaria
- Light Red Dutch: lichtrood in the arms of Hope (Note: Helmteeken: een aardbol met de meridianen en parallellen,vertoonende de werelddeelen van het oostelijk halfrond, de kusten met lichtrood afgezet en de zeeën van eene groenbruine kleur; de bol in den rechter bovenhoek ingescheurd, en overtopt door een regenboog, wiens beide uiteinden op wolken rusten, alles in natuurlijke kleur. (J-B Rieststap, De Wapens van den tegenwoordigen en den vroegeren Nederlandschen Adel))
- Dark Blue German: dunkelblau French: azur/bleu foncé appears in the arms of Trivulzio.
- Dark Grey German: dunkelgrau and Silver-grey German: silbergrau appear together in the arms of the city of Lübbenau (Note: in B. eine n. Schmerle, Rücken dunkelgrau, Bauch silbergrau, zwischen drei sechseckigen g. Sternen schwimmend, von denen einer oberhalb, zwei unterhalb schweben. (J. Siebmachers grosses und allgemeines Wappenbuch))
- Dark Brown German: dunkelbraun occurs in the arms of Butt (Note: in S. aus einem Wasser emportauchend ein dunkelbrauner Fisch {Butte} (J. Siebmachers grosses und allgemeines Wappenbuch))
- Light Brown German: hellbraun occurs in the arms of Tschitscherin.

The heraldic scholar A. C. Fox-Davies proposed that, in some circumstances, white should be considered a heraldic colour, distinct from argent; this is found occasionally of labels on an Argent or Or background. This has been speculated to be a blazoning nicety, or an attempt to suggest that the labels are "white labels proper" to avoid the appearance of violating the rule of tincture.

Other exceptional colours have occasionally appeared during the 20th and 21st centuries:

- The arms of the Jewish Autonomous Region in Russia have a field of aquamarine.
- The Canadian Heraldic Authority granted arms containing rose as a colour in 1997. (Note: Arms of Kim Campbell, 19th Prime Minister of Canada: Or the universal symbol for a woman pendant from its crosspiece a pair of scales Rose and in base three bars wavy Azure on a canton the mark of the Prime Ministership of Canada.)
- In 2002, the Authority granted arms including copper, treated as a metal, to the municipality of Whitehorse, Yukon.
- Ochre, both red and yellow, appears in South African heraldry; the national coat of arms, adopted in 2000, includes red ochre, while (possibly yellow but more likely red) ochre appears in the arms of the University of Transkei.

In the United States, as in most countries, heraldry is not governed by any official authority; but the United States Army, which makes extensive use of heraldry, does have its own authority, the United States Army Institute of Heraldry. The armorial designs of the Institute of Heraldry include a number of novel tinctures, including buff (employed variously as either a metal or a colour), and horizon blue. Silver gray has appeared in the heraldry of both the Army and the Air Force. Bronze appears as a colour in the arms of the Special Troops Battalion of the 2nd Brigade, 1st Cavalry Division. There seems to be some confusion about the colour crimson, as in some cases it is treated as a separate tincture, while in others it is used to specify the shade of gules to be employed by the artist. There is a similar issue with a blue-green colour referred to as teal or turquoise, which is either treated as separate or as a specific shade of azure or céleste. In contrast to most heraldic practice, the Institute of Heraldry often specifies the exact shades to be used in depicting various arms.

Buff has been used a single time by the Canadian Heraldic Authority, though not in a coat of arms; it is used for the badge of the Canadian Correctional Service who for many years wore distinctive buff-coloured uniforms.

==== Proper ====
A charge that is coloured as it naturally appears is blazoned proper (Fr. propre), or "the colour of nature". Strictly speaking, proper is not a tincture in itself, and if, as is sometimes the case, a charge is meant to be depicted in particular colours that are not apparent from the word "proper" alone, they may be specified in whatever detail is necessary. (Note: For example, a dapple-grey horse proper, the mane and tail sable, and both hind feet white.) Certain charges are considered "proper" when portrayed with particular colours, even though a range of different colours is found in nature; for instance, a popinjay proper is green, even though wild parrots occur in a variety of colours. In some cases, a charge depicted in a particular set of colours may be referred to as "proper", even though it consists entirely of heraldic tinctures; a rose proper, whether red or white, is barbed vert and seeded or.

The most extensive use of non-heraldic colours is probably associated with "landscape heraldry", a common feature of heraldry in many countries in the 18th and early 19th centuries. Although rarely used for the field itself, landscapes were often granted as augmentations, typically depicting a fortress successfully captured or defended, or a particular ship, or a battle in which the armiger to whom the augmentation was granted was involved. Such landscapes, usually appearing on a chief, might be blazoned with great particularity as to the things portrayed and the colours used to portray them. Officially, these landscapes appeared on a field of argent, but it was common, and perhaps expected, for the artist to add further details, such as the sky and clouds, by which the field might be wholly obscured. The use of landscapes in heraldry fell out of fashion during the Victorian era, when heraldic scholars and artists began looking to earlier and simpler periods of armorial design for inspiration.

== Terminology ==
In the English-speaking world, heraldic terminology is based largely on that of British armory, which in turn is based on Norman French. With respect to the heraldic tinctures, French heraldry, which is often cited by heraldic authors, uses similar terminology. However, German heraldry, also highly influential, uses a different vocabulary; it calls the colours by their everyday names. (Note: The Spanish languages, in common with English, also use heraldic terminology derived from Norman French; while Portuguese, Italian, Swedish, Polish and Czech, like German, use everyday names for the colours. Dutch is somewhat a hybrid.)

In its original sense, tincture refers only to the group conventionally referred to as "colours". But as the word "colour" seems inapplicable to the heraldic furs, and no other term clearly encompasses all three classes, the word "tincture" has come to be used in this broader sense, while "colour" has acquired the more restricted sense originally given to "tincture". Thus, when consulting various heraldic authorities, care must be taken to determine which meaning each term is given.

== Designations ==
=== Artistic liberties ===
In most heraldic tradition, the various metals and colours have no fixed appearance, hue, or shade. The heraldic artist is free to choose a lighter or darker blue or green, a deeper or brighter red; to choose between depicting or with yellow or any of various gold paints, to depict argent as white or silver. Recently the College of Arms explained, "there are no fixed shades for heraldic colours. If the official description of a coat of arms gives its tinctures as Gules (red), Azure (blue) and Argent (white or silver) then, as long as the blue is not too light and the red not too orange, purple or pink, it is up to the artists to decide which particular shades they think are appropriate."

=== In blazoning ===
Most heraldic authors do not capitalise the names of the various tinctures, although a few do (sometimes inconsistently), and some who do not capitalise the other tinctures recommend capitalising or in order to avoid confusion with the conjunction.

However, there are relatively few occasions in which the conjunction "or" would appear in the blazon of a coat of arms, and if properly worded, which meaning is intended should be readily apparent from the context. Another convention has been to capitalise only the first word or the first tincture appearing in the blazon, but no other words. In the elaborate calligraphy appearing on most grants of arms, all of the tinctures are capitalised, as indeed are the names of the charges, but this is purely a matter of decorative style, and in no way does the manner of capitalization used in the original grant affect how the arms may be described on other occasions.

A long-standing heraldic tradition has been to avoid repeating the names of tinctures multiple times in any given blazon. If it is possible to mention multiple charges of the same tincture at once, followed by the name of the tincture, then this problem is avoided, but when it is impossible to combine elements of the same tincture in this manner, more creative descriptions may be used. For example, instead of "gules, on a fess or between three chess-rooks argent, a lion passant gules, armed and langued argent", one might say, "gules, on a fess or between three chess-rooks argent, a lion passant of the field, armed and langued of the third." Similar phrases include "of the last" and "of the like". Alternately, descriptions such as "gold" and "silver" might be substituted for "or" and "argent" on a subsequent occurrence. Another rule of blazon relating to tinctures suggests the placing of a comma after each occurrence of a tincture.

In recent years, the College of Arms has regularly dispensed with many of these practices, believing them to cause confusion, and in new grants of arms, the names of tinctures are repeated on each instance that they occur. The names of all tinctures and charges are capitalised, although the word "proper", indicating the colour of nature, is not, and internal commas are entirely omitted.

==== Rule of tincture ====
The first so-called "rule" of heraldry is the rule of tincture: metal should not be placed upon metal, nor colour upon colour, for the sake of contrast.

The main duty of a heraldic device is to be recognised, and the dark colours or light metals are supposed to be too difficult to distinguish if they are placed on top of other dark or light colours, particularly in poor light. Though this is the practical genesis of the rule, the rule is technical and appearance is not used in determining whether arms conform to the rule.

This "rule" has at times been followed so pedantically that arms that violate it were called armes fausses "false arms" or armes à enquérir "arms of enquiry"; any violation was presumed to be intentional, to the point that one was supposed to enquire how it came to pass. One of the most famous armes à enquérir was the shield of the Kingdom of Jerusalem, which had gold crosses on silver. This use of white and gold together is also seen on the arms of the King of Jerusalem, the flag and arms of the Vatican, and the bishop's mitre in the arms of Andorra. These uses of gold on silver indicate the exceptional holy and special status of these coats of arms. An example of "colour on colour" is the arms of Albania, with its sable two-headed eagle on a gules field.

French-language heraldry sometimes uses cousu ("sewn") to highlight and justify coloured ordinaries on a coloured field. The conceit is that rather than sitting on top of the field, the ordinary is inset, as though sewn, into it. This is by far most often used with chiefs; coloured chiefs above a coloured field are relatively much more common in French than in other traditions.

A survey of metal-on-metal incidences on arms has been undertaken by Bruno Heim within the work Or and Argent.

The "rule of tincture" has had an influence reaching far beyond heraldry. It has been applied to the design of flags, so that the flag of Saxe-Weimar-Eisenach was modified to conform to the rule.

==== Counterchanging ====
When a charge or group of charges is placed across a division line, variation, or ordinary, it may be counterchanged (Fr. contre-changé, but modern de l'un en l'autre, Ger. verwechselte Farben or verschränkte Farben), meaning that the charges are divided the same way as the field upon which they rest, with the colours reversed.

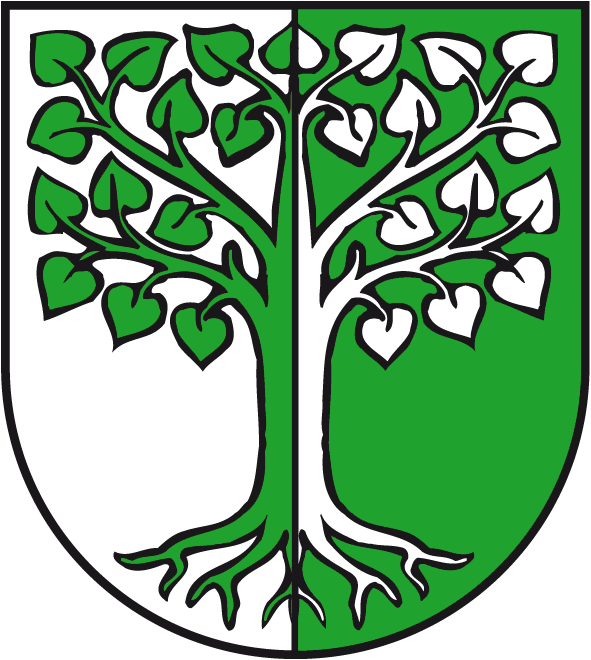
Arms of Behnsdorf: "per pale Argent and Vert a tilia eradicated counterchanged"

In the municipal arms of Behnsdorf, Saxony-Anhalt, seen here, the field is divided with the left half white (argent) and the right half green (vert), and the counterchanged tree is green where it lies on the white part of the field, and white where it lies on the green part.

The flag of Maryland

The flag of Maryland is another example of counterchanging. The only U.S. state flag to be directly based on English heraldry, it is the arms of George Calvert, 1st Baron Baltimore, who founded the colony of Maryland in 1632. In the 1st and 4th quarters, the field is divided into six vertical bands of gold (or) and black (sable) with a diagonal band (a bend) in which the colours are reversed (i.e., the bend is counterchanged). The 2nd and 3rd quarters are themselves quartered between white (argent) and red (gules) with a counterchanged cross bottony that is red where it lies on the white part of the field and white where it lies on the red part of the field.

Counterchanging is rare in early heraldry; early examples from German heraldry are found in the late fifteenth-century Wernigerode Armorial; it becomes more frequently applied from the seventeenth century onward, especially with the substantial number of newly created coats of arms, of which some notable examples include Baron Baltimore (1624), Nightingale baronets (1628), Barrett-Lennard baronets (1801), Verney baronets (1818), and Baron Alvingham (1929).

In Scottish heraldry, charges are sometimes blazoned as counterchanged of different colours from the field – for instance, per fess gules and azure, a sun in splendour counterchanged or and of the first. A more typical blazon for this would be per fess gules and azure, a sun in splendour per fess or and of the first.

The term countercoloured is sometimes used in place of counterchanged. The arms of the Fenwick baronets were originally blazoned as silver, a chief gules with six martlets countercoloured. In this case, three martlets argent rest on a chief gules, while three martlets gules rest on the argent field. Some heraldic authorities regard the use of this term as erroneous.

Examples of counterchanging

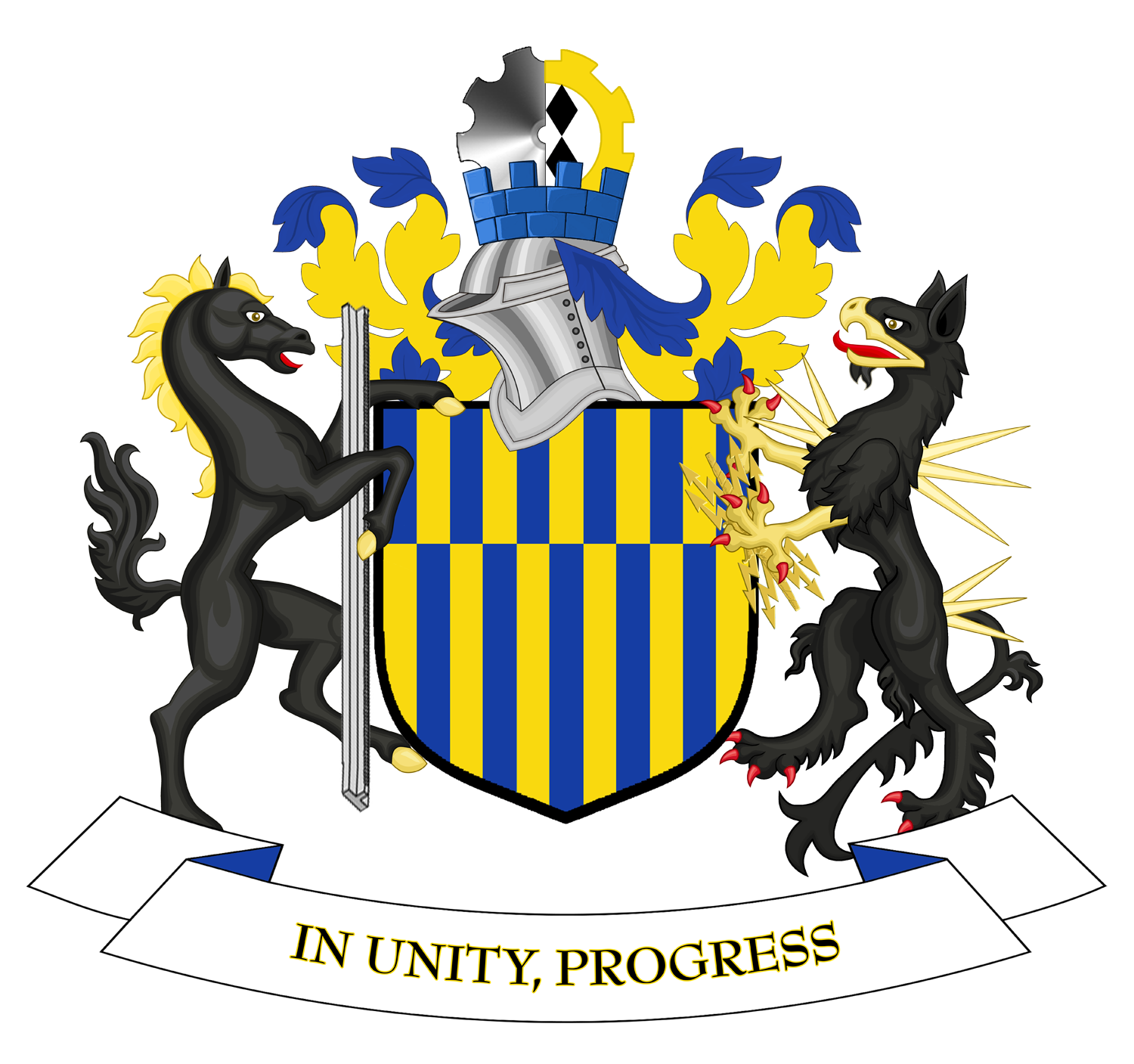
Arms of the Gateshead Metropolitan Borough Council: Or a Chief Azure overall five Pallets counterchanged.

Arms of Balfour, baronets of Albury Lodge.

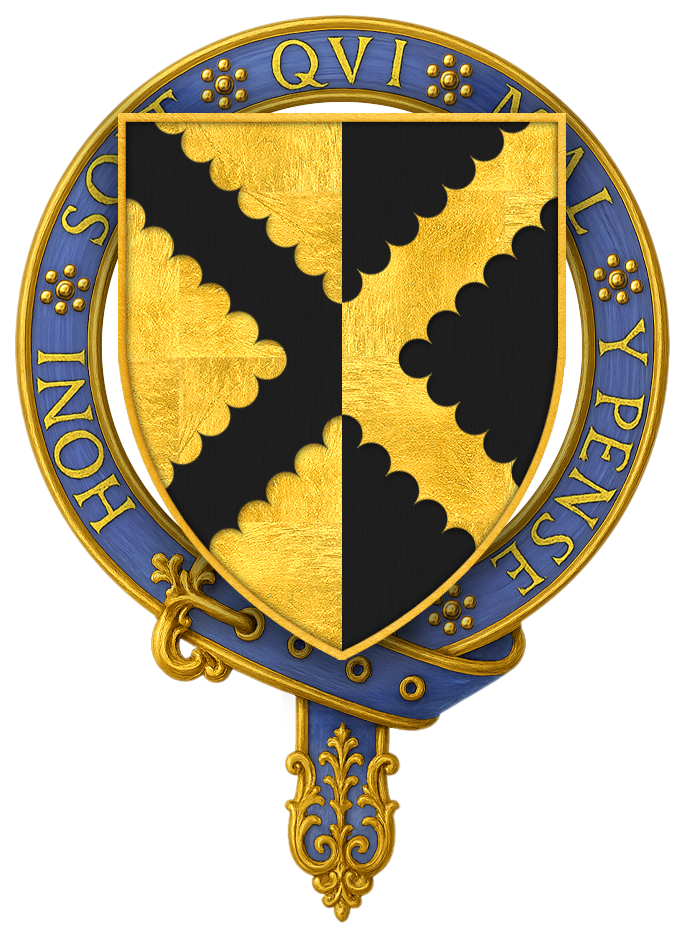
Arms of Sir Richard Pole. Per pale or and sable, a saltire engrailed counterchanged

Arms of the Viscounts Knollys Per pale gules and argent on a chevron three roses counterchanged barbed and seeded proper

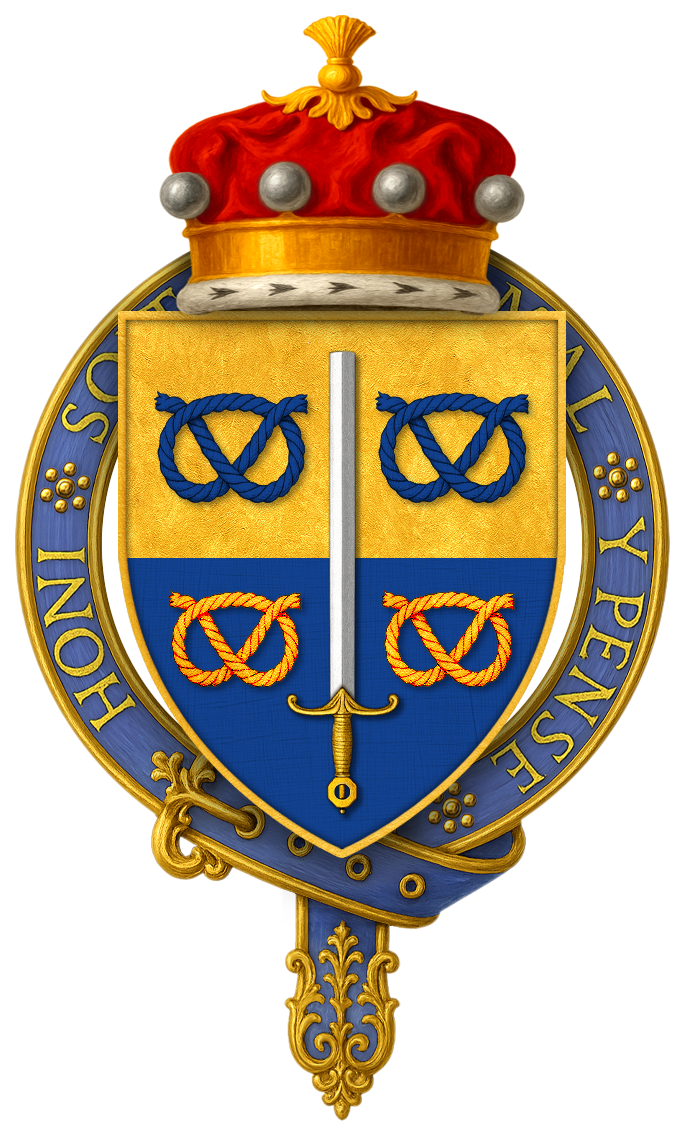
Arms of Lord Peach Per fess Or and Azure the Sword of Mercy erect pommel in base Proper between four Stafford Knots all counterchanged.

Arms of Baron Alvingham Per pale argent and azure, on a chevron between three chaplets of roses counterchanged

=== Monochromatic presentation ===
==== Hatching ====
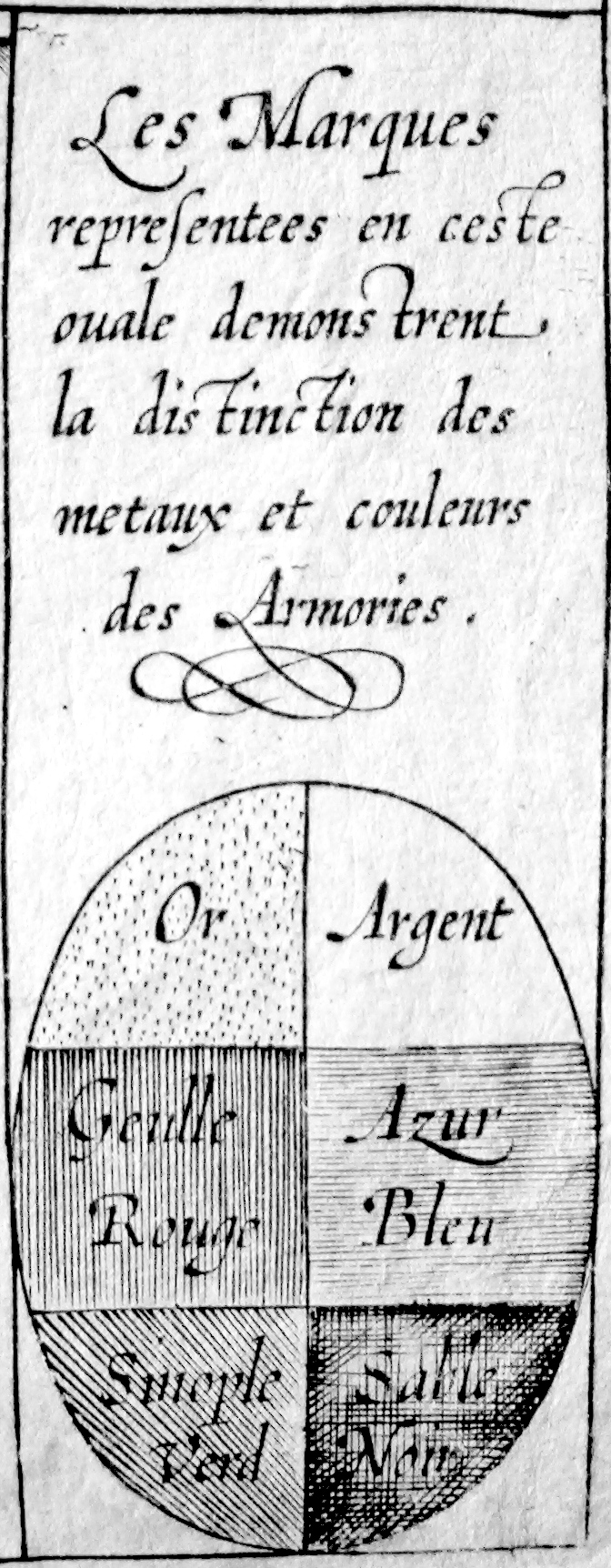
Hatching guide by Jan Baptist Zangrius, 1600

During the first half of the seventeenth century, the proliferation of the printing press coupled with the persistence of difficulties in and expense of colour printing prompted the development of a number of systems of hatching for the purpose of depicting heraldic designs without the use of colour. Intended chiefly for printing and engraving, the system which eventually gained widespread acceptance was that of Silvestro de Petra Sancta, a Jesuit priest and heraldic scholar, originally published in 1638.

In Petra Sancta's method, illustrated in the table above, a separate hatching represents each metal and colour, while the furs are treated as combinations of metal and colour. Argent is represented by a plain field, while or is represented by a field strewn with dots. Gules is represented by vertical lines, azure by horizontal lines, and sable by a combination of horizontal and vertical lines. Diagonal lines running from dexter chief to sinister base represent vert, while purpure is the reverse, represented by diagonal lines running from sinister chief to dexter base. Sanguine is represented by diagonal lines running in each direction, while tenné is represented by a combination of horizontal lines and diagonal lines running from sinister chief to dexter base.

Nine additional hatchings, published by Marcus Vulson de la Colombière in 1639, were intended to represent other colours, although none of them correspond with regular heraldic tinctures, and they have never been used in British armory. A combination of vertical lines with diagonal lines running from dexter chief to sinister base represents brown; blood red is represented by vertical lines combined with diagonal lines running from sinister chief to dexter base; earth-colour by horizontal and vertical lines combined with diagonal lines running from dexter chief to sinister base; iron-grey by diagonal lines running in each direction (the same as sanguine in Petra Sancta's system); water-colour by broken horizontal lines; flesh-colour by broken vertical lines; ashen-grey by a combination of broken horizontal and broken diagonal lines; orange by broken vertical lines interspersed with dots; and the colour of nature by zig-zag lines running from dexter chief to sinister base.

Given the hatching of Sable with vertical and horizontal meshing lines, this tincture is sometimes represented in German armorials with a # character. This avoids the need to use S for Schwartz (=sable), which would be confused with the S used for Silber (=argent).

==== Tricking ====
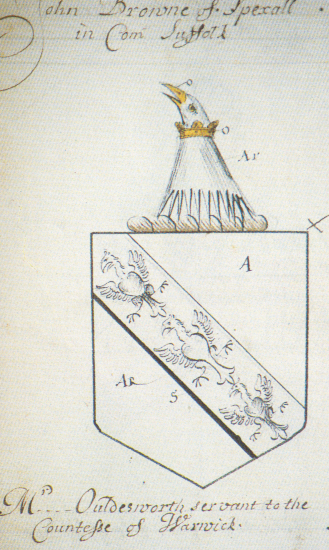
Tricked arms of John Browne of Spexhall, Suffolk (1591)

Another method of depicting tinctures on monchrome depictions of arms is to label them using letter or abbreviations, a practice known as "tricking". The arms are drawn in outline, and the tinctures written in abbreviated form. In English heraldry, the abbreviations are O or or for or; A, ar, or arg for argent, G or gu for gules; S or sa for sable; Az or B for azure (B for "blue" being used in older trickings to avoid confusion between ar and az); Vt for vert, Purp for purpure, and Pr for proper. Although most records of the College of Arms are in colour, the practice of tricking is used in all other cases, even after the widespread adoption of hatching for printing and engraving arms.

French heraldry also uses tricking to depict heraldic tinctures, using O for or, A for argent, G for gules, S for sable, B for bleu, V for vert, P for purpure or pourpre; and Pr for propre.

In German heraldry, G is used for gelb (yellow or gold), W for weiss (white or silver), R for rot (red), S for schwarz (black), B for blau (blue), Gr or a shape like an upright leaf for grün (green), and Br for braun (purple). These abbreviations may be either capitalized or lowercase.

=== Poetic representation ===
Heraldry has been influenced by allegorical and astrological views, including the idea of sympathies and antipathies among stars, minerals, animals, plants, and people. Some tinctures were considered to represent astrological symbols.

One system of poetic attributions to the tinctures
Name		Argent	Or	Gules	Sable	Azure	Vert	Purpure	Murrey	Sanguine	Tenné
Poetic designations	Heavenly body	Moon, ☾	Sun, ☉	Mars, ♂	Saturn, ♄	Jupiter, ♃	Venus, ♀	Mercury, ☿	Dragon's Tail, ☋	Dragon's Tail, ☋	Dragon's Head, ☊
Poetic designations	Jewel	Pearl	Topaz	Ruby	Diamond	Sapphire	Emerald	Amethyst	Sardonyx	Sardonyx	Jacinth

The lore of sympathies originated with the Babylonians, who saw gems and rare minerals as the concentrates of cosmic powers. Later, Pliny the Elder's Natural History organised nature according to a system of sympathies and antipathies among species and other elements of the natural world. This doctrine influenced medieval medicine, pharmacy, alchemy and also heraldry. During the 1350s, the work of Bartolo de Sassoferrato (1313/1314–1357) linked Or to the sun, Azure to the element air, and Gules to the element fire. Honoré Bonet, a heraldist from Provence, declared in his work Arbre des Batailles (1387) that the metal gold (Or) is the noblest in the world because, due to its very nature, it is bright and shining and full of virtues. During the late medieval period and Renaissance, there was an occasional practice of blazoning tinctures by gemstones, or by references to the seven classical "planets" (including the sun and the moon).

The work of Bonet influenced the 15th century Burgundian heraldist Jean Courtois (d. 1436), also known as the Sicily Herald. In his work Le Blason des Couleurs (1414), Courtois developed a heraldic system consisting of the tinctures, planets and carbuncles, together with the virtues, metals, months, the zodiac, and weekdays. His main contribution was the development of a gemstone-planetary blazon that related colour to gemstone to planet: or, topaz, the sun; argent, pearl, the moon; gules, ruby, Mars; sable, diamond, Saturn; azure, sapphire, Jupiter; vert, emerald, Venus; purpure, amethyst, Mercury; tenné, jacinth, dragon's head (ascending lunar node); sanguine/murrey, sardonyx, dragon's tail (descending lunar node).

The dragon's head (also called Anabibazon in astronomy and astrology) and dragon's tail (also called Catabibazon) were in use from ancient times. In heraldry the dragon's head symbolises a light colour (tenné), and dragon's tail symbolises a dark colour (sanguine). In alchemy the dragon's head is the materia prima that is subjected to transmutation to produce the philosopher's stone. During the process of transmutation the light-coloured starting material is transformed to a darker and more reddish one.

In astrology the dragon's head is connected to good luck, while the dragon's tail is unlucky. These links indicate that heraldry in the 15th century was strongly under the influence of magical views and alchemistic ideas, which were in turn connected to the lore of sympathies between colours, planets, gemstones, metals, virtues etc. (Note: The odd terminology of colours used by Heraldus Britannus, as mentioned by Spener, can partly reflect the view of alchemy: aurum–cytrine, argentum–aspre, rubeus–coccine, caeruleus– veneto, Niger–mauro, viridis–prasino, and purpureus–oiscy.)

The work of Jean Courtois was distributed in manuscripts and later in one of the first books printed in French. During the Tudor and Stuart dynasties in England (1485–1702), it appeared in heraldry manuals. In his book Traité du blason (1465), Clément Prinsault deals with the relation of colours to the virtues, the seven planets, the 12 celestial signs, gemstones, weekdays, the three elements etc. This book is among the earliest writings on heraldry available today.

The English historian and heraldist Sir Henry Spelman (1564–1641) used the symbols of the planets to designate tinctures in his 1654 book Aspilogia. Sir John Ferne (d. 1609) enumerates 14 different methods of blazon: 1. by colours; 2. by planets; 3. by precious stones; 4. by virtues; 5. by celestial signs; 6. by the months of the year; 7. by the days of the week; 8. by the ages of man; 9. by flowers; 10. by the elements; 11. by the seasons of the year; 12. by the complexions of man; 13. by numbers; and 14. by metals.

As well as the main tinctures, tricking abbreviations for other tinctures such as Proper – ppr, pp, Ermine – er etc. existed in English and some other languages during the Renaissance. To designate carnation (carnea tinctura), the zodiac sign of Leo was used in reverse. German heraldry used trefoil to designate colours other than the seven main tinctures ("qui ultimus color alibi signo trifolii ♣ pinguitur"). Spener (1717. p. 113) also linked tenné and sanguine to the zodiac sign of Leo (♌︎) . Rudolphi also refers to trefoil (♣) as a designation of colour vert, usually connected with Venus. He also assigned specific variants of astrological signs for dragon's head and dragon's tail (☊ ☋), derived from the sign for Leo, to the tinctures orange and carnation, respectively.

Ultimately, a system of nine tinctures was developed, with dukes, earls, and barons having their arms blazoned by gemstones, and princes, kings and emperors having arms blazoned by the planets. The Austrian troubadour and herald Peter Suchenwirt (c. 1320 – 1395) used gemstones to designate the tinctures even earlier (c. 1355) in the coat of arms of the Hungarian king Louis the Great (1342–1382). (Note: "I wish I was so ingenious and sage to praise the brilliance of his arms, held by him in honour, according to my volition! His escutcheon is not disfigured by any flaws; it beams a silvery colour, and is divided in two equal parts. One field gleams in the light colour of pearls and rubies, and is polished for radiant, and there lie in the horizontal direction eight picked fesses; another field of blue celeste is redundantly graced by domed golden fleurs-de-lis that stood by the arms many times with their plentiful rays, which are very pleasant to see. The helmet's top decorates a richly decked golden crown with a lot of shining gemstones, smoothed to lustrous; from the crown standing off two ostrich feathers and between them to be seen the ermine neck of the ostrich; his eyes sparkling from the rubies towards the enemy, his bill is golden, in which he beautifully holds a handsomely curved horseshoe-shaped charge made of gold. His head is being richly crowned by gold." This poem is an evidence that in the past there really existed some coat of arms made of gemstones.) Konrad von Würzburg (c. 1230 – 1287) also mentioned coats of arms made of gemstones in his poem Turnier von Nantheiz (c. 1258), for example describing the arms of the king of England as an escutcheon covered with Arabian gold with leopards made of rubies (lines 310–320). (Note: "smaragden und karvunkel [Karfunkelsteine],/ jachande [Hyazinthsteine] und crisolîten [Krisolithen],/ die wurden bi den zîten/ getengelt ûz den schilten." Rough translation: "emeralds and carbunkles,/ jacinth and cryolites,/ these were in that time/ mixed upon the shield.")

== See also ==
- Orange (heraldry)
- Rose (heraldic tincture)

== Bibliography ==
- Boutell, Charles; Aveling, S. T. (1890). Heraldry, Ancient and Modern: Including Boutell's Heraldry. London: Frederick Warne. OCLC 6102523 – via Internet Archive.
- Elvin, Charles Norton (1889). A dictionary of heraldry. London: Kent and Co. OCLC 919809145 – via Internet Archive.
- Fox-Davies, Arthur Charles (1904). The Art of Heraldry: An Encyclopædia of Armory. London: Benjamin Blom. LCCN 68056481.
- Fox-Davies, Arthur Charles (1909). A Complete Guide to Heraldry. New York: Dodge Publishing. LCCN 09023803 – via Internet Archive.
- Franklyn, Julian (1968). Heraldry. Cranbury, NJ: A. S. Barnes and Company. ISBN 9780498066832.
- Parker, James; Gough, Henry (1894). A glossary of terms used in heraldry. London: James Parker. LCCN 77094021 – via Internet Archive.
- Leonhard, Walter (1976). Das große Buch der Wappenkunst [The big book of heraldry] (in German). Munich: Callway-Verlag.
- Neubecker, Ottfried (1977). Heraldry: Sources, Symbols and Meaning. London: Macdonald and Jane's. ISBN 9780354044936. OCLC 852003621.
- Pastoureau, Michel (1997). Heraldry: An Introduction to a Noble Tradition. Abrams Discoveries. Harry N. Abrams. ISBN 9780810928305.
- Pimbley, Arthur Francis (1908). Pimbley's Dictionary of Heraldry: An Authoritative Guide to the Terminology of Heraldry. Pimbley. LCCN 08029181 – via Internet Archive.
- Slater, Stephen (2003). The Complete Book of Heraldry. New York: Hermes House. ISBN 9781843098249.
- von Volborth, Carl-Alexander (1981). Heraldry: Customs, Rules and Styles. Dorset: Blandford Press. ISBN 0-7137-0940-5. LCCN 81670212.
- Woodward, John; Burnett, George (1892) [1884]. A treatise on heraldry, British and foreign: with English and French glossaries. Edinburgh: W. & A. B. Johnson. LCCN 02020303 – via Internet Archive.
- Woodcock, Thomas; Robinson, John Martin (1990). The Oxford Guide to Heraldry. Oxford, New York, Edinburgh, Toronto: Oxford University Press. ISBN 0192852248.
