= Coat of arms of Whitehorse =

Coat of Arms of Whitehorse
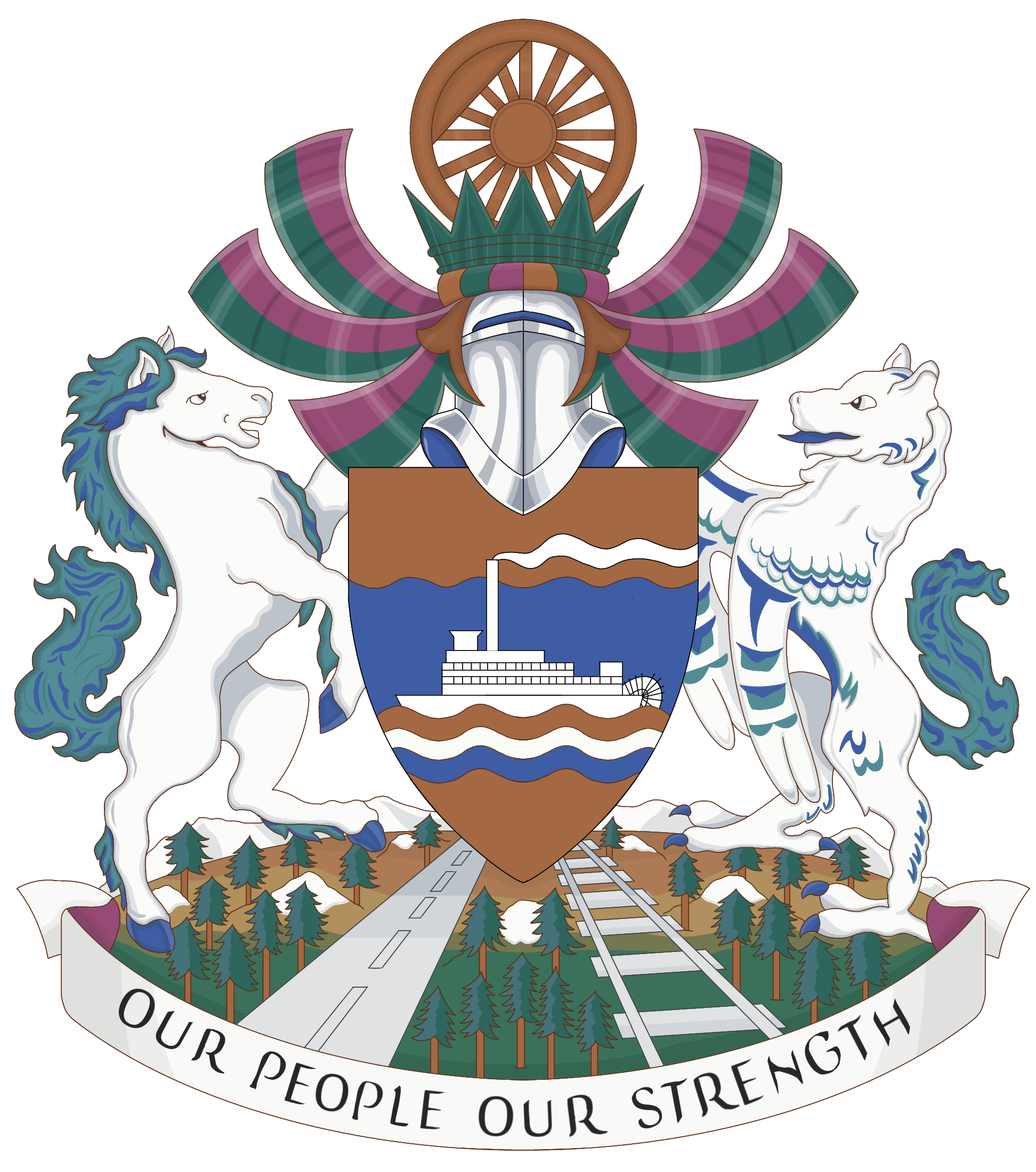
- Armiger: Whitehorse, Yukon
- Adopted: 2002
- Crest: Issuant from an antique crown Vert a steam locomotive wheel Copper
- Shield: Copper on a fess wavy Azure a paddlewheel steamboat Argent, in base a bar wavy per fess wavy Argent and Azure
- Supporters: Dexter a horse, sinister a wolf-raven, both Argent embellished Azure and Vert and standing on a compartment set with mountains, conifers, a highway, and railway tracks proper
- Motto: Our People Our Strength

The coat of arms of Whitehorse is the full armorial achievement as used by the municipal government of Whitehorse as an official symbol. The arms were granted on 15 November 2002.

In the top and the bottom of the shield as well as on the crest, these arms feature copper, a heraldic tincture of the metallic sort which has been introduced in Canadian heraldry. In the arms of Whitehorse, this tincture stands for the copper mining industry in the town and the importance of this metal for the first nations.

The main charge of the coat of arms is a paddlewheel steamboat, which was used as a symbol of the town long before the arms were granted due to its importance for the founding and growth of the town. The crest is a steam locomotive wheel rising from a crown. The wheel symbolises the importance of the railway and Whitehorse as a transportation hub. The dexter supporter is a white horse, cantingly reflecting the towns name, while the sinister supporter is a 'wolf-raven', a mix of a wolf and a raven, for the two clans of the Yukon First Nations.
