= Luis de Narváez =

Spanish composer, vihuelist

Luis de Narváez (fl. Approx: 1490 - 1550) was a Spanish composer and vihuelist. Highly regarded and infleuntial his works are still performed to this day including his very famous "Guárdame Las Vacas" which is popular with classical guitarists. Narváez is also known for Los seys libros del Delphín, a collection of polyphonic music for the vihuela which includes the earliest known variation sets and other works.

== Life ==
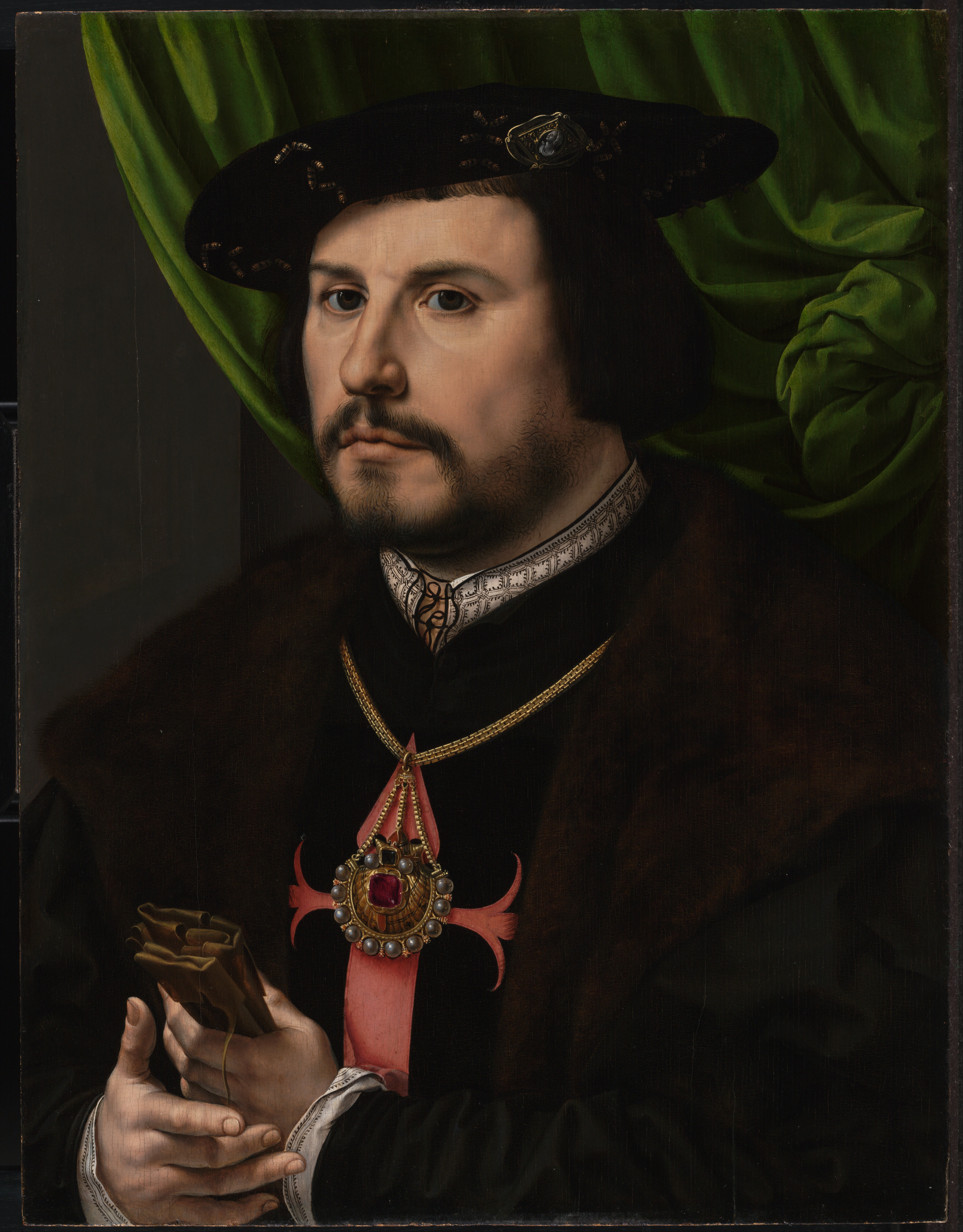
Francisco de los Cobos, Narváez's most important patron, painted by Jan Gossaert in c. 1530

The exact date or even year of Narváez's birth is unknown. He was born in Granada and the earliest surviving references to him indicate that as early as 1526 he was a member of the household of Francisco de los Cobos y Molina, a well-known and very successful patron of the arts who was the Secretary of State and commentator for the kingdom of Castile under Charles V. Narváez lived in Valladolid with his patron until the latter's death in 1547, although he was working for the Duke of Medina Sidonia between 1539 and 1540. It was during this period that the composer published Los seys libros del delphín (Valladolid, 1538), a large collection of music.

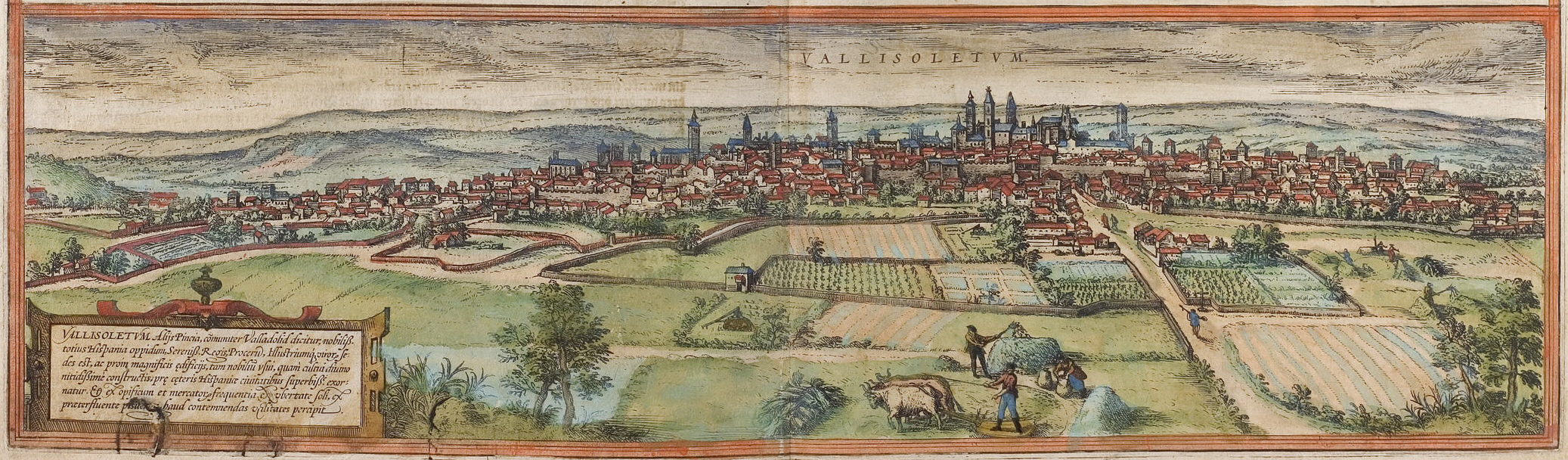
A 16th-century painting of Valladolid, where Narváez lived and worked for more than two decades

By 1548 Narváez was employed as musician of the royal chapel, where he also taught music to choristers. His colleagues there included the famous keyboard composer Antonio de Cabezón. Narváez and Cabezón were both employed as musicians for Felipe, Regent of Spain (later Philip II of Spain), and accompanied him on his many journeys. The last reference to Narváez is from one such journey: during the winter of 1549 he resided in the Low Countries.

Narváez was very highly regarded during his lifetime, particularly for his vihuela playing; he was reported to be able to improvise four parts over another four at sight. His son Andrés also became an accomplished vihuelist.

== Works ==
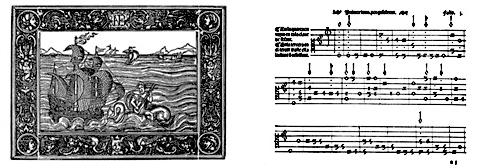
Title page and a music excerpt from Los seys libros del delphín

Narváez's most important surviving music is contained in Los seys libros del Delphin de música de cifras para tañer vihuela (Valladolid, 1538), a six-volume collection of music for vihuela. The collection begins with a preface, in which the composer dedicates the work to his patron Francisco de los Cobos. A short text on notation follows (Narváez uses a slightly modified version of Italian lute tablature), then the table of contents and an errata sheet.

The first two volumes contain fourteen polyphonic fantasias, modelled after Italian pieces of the same kind. They are characterized by smooth, competent imitative writing in two and three voices. Occasionally Narváez resorts to using short motifs with identical left-hand fingerings, probably reflecting the techniques he used for improvisation. The music reflects the influence of Francesco da Milano, whose works Narváez collected. The third volume of the collection is dedicated exclusively to intabulations of works by other composers: selections from masses by Josquin des Prez, the famous song Mille Regretz by the same composer (subtitled "La canción del Emperador", probably suggesting that it was Charles V's favorite song), and two songs by Nicolas Gombert and one by Jean Richafort. The second of the two songs is wrongly attributed to Gombert, it is a work of Jean Courtois. The intabulations are of high quality, but without any particular distinguishing features.

Volumes four to six have mixed content. The most important pieces are Narváez's six diferencias, or variations, the earliest known examples of the form. Narváez's models include both sacred (volume 4 only) and secular melodies, and the music stands out by virtue of a very wide palette of techniques. Apart from melodic variations, there are also two sets on ostinato harmonies: Guardame las vacas and Conde claros, both in volume six. The remaining music comprises villancicos, romances, and a Baxa de contrapunto.

With the exception of two motets, no other music by Narváez survives, although he must have composed a substantial amount of vocal music.

== List of works ==
The following is a list of pieces found in Los seys libros del delphín, following the original order. Roman numerals in parentheses are not original and are provided for convenience only.

- Volume 1
  1. Fantasia (I) del primer tono por gesolreut
  2. Fantasia (II) del segundo tono
  3. Fantasia (III) del tercer tono
  4. Fantasia (IV) del quarto tono
  5. Fantasia (V) del quinto tono de consonancia
  6. Fantasia (VI) del sesto tono sobre fa ut mi re
  7. Fantasia (VII) del setimo tono sobre ut re mi fa mi
  8. Fantasia (VIII) del octavo tono
- Volume 2: Ay en el fantasias por algunos tonos que no son tan dificultosas de tañer como las del primer libro
  1. Fantasia (IX) del primer tono
  2. Fantasia (X) del quarto tono
  3. Fantasia (XI) del quinto tono
  4. Fantasia (XII) del quinto tono
  5. Fantasia (XIII) del primer tono
  6. Fantasia (XIV) del primer tono
- Volume 3: Ay en el obras compuestas de Josquin y canciones Francesas de diversos autores
  1. Sanctus de la misa de Ercules dux de josquin—Ossanna de la misma missa ("Sanctus" and "Osanna" from Josquin's Missa Hercules Dux Ferrariae)
  2. Sanctus de josquin de la misa de faissan regres—Ossanna de la misma missa ("Sanctus" and "Osanna" from Josquin's Missa Faisant regretz)
  3. Cum sancto spiritu de la missa de la fuga de josquin (from Josquin's Missa Sine nomine)
  4. Mille regres. La canción del Emperador del quarto tono de Jusquin (Josquin's chanson Mille Regretz)
  5. Cancion de Nicolas Gombert del quinto tono (Nicolas Gombert's chanson Jamais je n'eus tant de soulas)
  6. Otra cancion del primer tono (not by Gombert as is stated in Narváez book, but in reality by Jean Courtois: chanson Si par souffrir )
  7. Je veulx laysser melancolie (Jean Richafort's chanson)
- Volume 4: y en el diferencias de contrapuntos sobre el igno de nuestra Señora O gloriosa domina, y de Pange lingua y Sacris solenniis
  1. O gloriosa domina (6 differencias)
  2. Sacris solenniis (5 differencias)
- Volume 5: Ay en el romances y villancicos para tañer y cantar y contrapunctos sobre algunos villancicos
  1. Ya se asienta el rey Ramiro
  2. Paseavase el rey Moro
  3. Si tantos halcones (3 differencias)
  4. Y la mi cinta dorada (6 differencias)
  5. La bella mal maridada
  6. Con que la lavare
  7. Ay arde coraçon
- Volume 6: Ay en el veynte y dos diferencias de Conde claros para discantar y siete diferencias de guardame las vacas, y una baxa de contrapunto
  1. Conde claros (22 differencias)
  2. Guardame las vacas (7 differencias)
  3. Baxa de contrapunto

== Editions ==
- With the resurrection of the lost arts of vihuela-making and -playing in the 20th century, Emilio Pujol edited the volume on Narváez (1945) for the authoritative series Monumentos de la música española (Monuments of Spanish Music).

A new transcription for guitar, edited by Stefan Nesyba, contains all of the solo works by Narváez: http://www.editionhh.co.uk/
