= Rose (tincture) =

Colour used in heraldic design

- Class: Non-standard colour
- Non-heraldic equivalent: Pink

Monochromatic designations
- Hatching pattern

Poetic designations

Rose is the non-traditional tincture of rose or pink as used in heraldry.

Rose has been introduced in Canadian heraldry from the late 20th century. It is now considered a colour in Canadian heraldry, along with azure (blue), gules (red), vert (green) and sable (black). The colour features in the coat of arms of former Canadian prime minister Kim Campbell. It remains to be seen whether the tincture will be used in heraldic arms in other countries.

Although similar, it should not be confused with the tincture carnation used in French heraldry. Carnation is the color used to depict pale human skin, and tends to be light pinkish-peach. Rose is much brighter, more highly saturated, and closer to pink than carnation.

No hatching pattern has been given to rose, since this colour is more recent than Fox-Davies' Complete Guide to Heraldry, the source of hatching patterns used in modern heraldry.

== Gallery ==
Coat of Arms of Pryvałka, Belarus

Kim Campbell's coat of arms
