= Courtois =

Courtois may refer to:

== Locations ==
- Courtois-sur-Yonne, a commune in Yonne department, France
- Courtois, Missouri, an unincorporated community
- Courtois Creek, a creek in Missouri
- Courtois Hills, a region in Missouri

== Persons ==
=== Painters ===
- Jean Courtois (herald) (died 1436), French herald
- Jacques Courtois (1621–1676), French painter
- Guillaume Courtois (1628–1679), French painter
- Marie Courtois (c.1655–1703), French miniature painter
- Gustave-Claude-Etienne Courtois (1852–1923), French painter

=== Science, medicine, technology ===
- Bernard Courtois (1777–1838), French chemist, discoverer of iodine
- Frédéric Courtois (1860–1928), French missionary and naturalist
- Hélène Courtois, French astrophysicist
- Jacques Courtois (Canada) (1920–1996) was a Canadian lawyer and public official
- Jean-Philippe Courtois, president of Microsoft International
- Nicolas Courtois, French cryptographer, lecturer in computer science at University College London
- Stéphane Courtois (born 1947), French historian, author and editor of Black Book of Communism

=== Music ===
- Antoine Courtois (founded 1789), French manufacturer of brass instruments
- Jean Courtois (composer) (fl. 1530–1545), Franco-Flemish composer
- Lambert Courtois (c.1520–after 1583), French composer

=== Politics ===
- Edme-Bonaventure Courtois played a role in the Fall of Robespierre
- Jean-Patrick Courtois (born 1951), member of the French Senate

=== Sports ===
- Roger Courtois (1912–1972), French football player and manager
- Jacques Courtois (ice hockey), president of the Montreal Canadiens 1972–79
- Alain Courtois (born 1951), Belgian politician, Secretary General of the Belgian Football Association
- Laurence Courtois (born 1976), Belgian former professional tennis player
- Laurent Courtois (born 1978), French footballer
- Imke Courtois (born 1988), Belgian footballer
- Pauline Courtois (born 1989), French sailor
- Valérie Courtois (born 1990), Belgian volleyball player
- Thibaut Courtois (born 1992), Belgian footballer

=== Fiction ===
- Guiron le Courtois, character in 13th-century Arthurian legend

== Other uses ==
- Banque Courtois, oldest existing bank in France, now part of Crédit du Nord

== See also ==
- Curtois
