= Cendrée =

Heraldic tincture

Cendrée colours

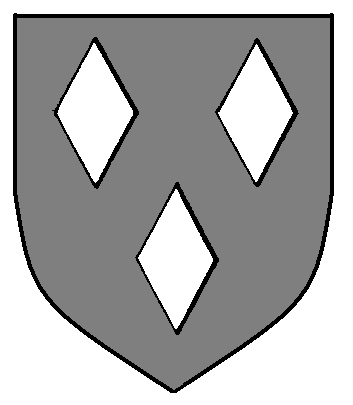
Arms of the House of Lilburn: Cendree, three fusils argent.

In heraldry, cendrée /ˈsɛndreɪ/ is a tincture, the grey of ashes (French: cendres), iron, and stone walls.

It is virtually unknown in Anglophone heraldry, but occasionally attested in Germany, and to a lesser extent in France.

A rare British example is the arms of Uplawmoor Primary School (Public Register vol 81, p 62): Tierced per pale: first, cendree and second gules over all a bell tower per pale argent and cendree, the bell counterchanged; third per pale argent and cendree, a square tower counterchanged; a base tierced per pale, first gules, second argent a book expanded cendree, third per bend gules and cendree three edock leaves conjoined at the stalk in triangle, one in bend, and two in bend sinister argent.
