= Copper (tincture) =

Metal in heraldry

In heraldry, copper is the tincture of metallic copper. Copper has been introduced in Canadian heraldry. It is considered a metal along with Argent (silver) and Or (gold) and should be depicted as bright, new copper metal.

While not commonly used, it features prominently in the arms of the City of Whitehorse, Yukon, as well as the coat of arms of Cyprus.

== Gallery ==
Coat of arms of Whitehorse, Yukon.

Coat of arms of Kaltern an der Weinstraße.

Badge of Office of Coppermine Herald.
