= Honoré Bonet =

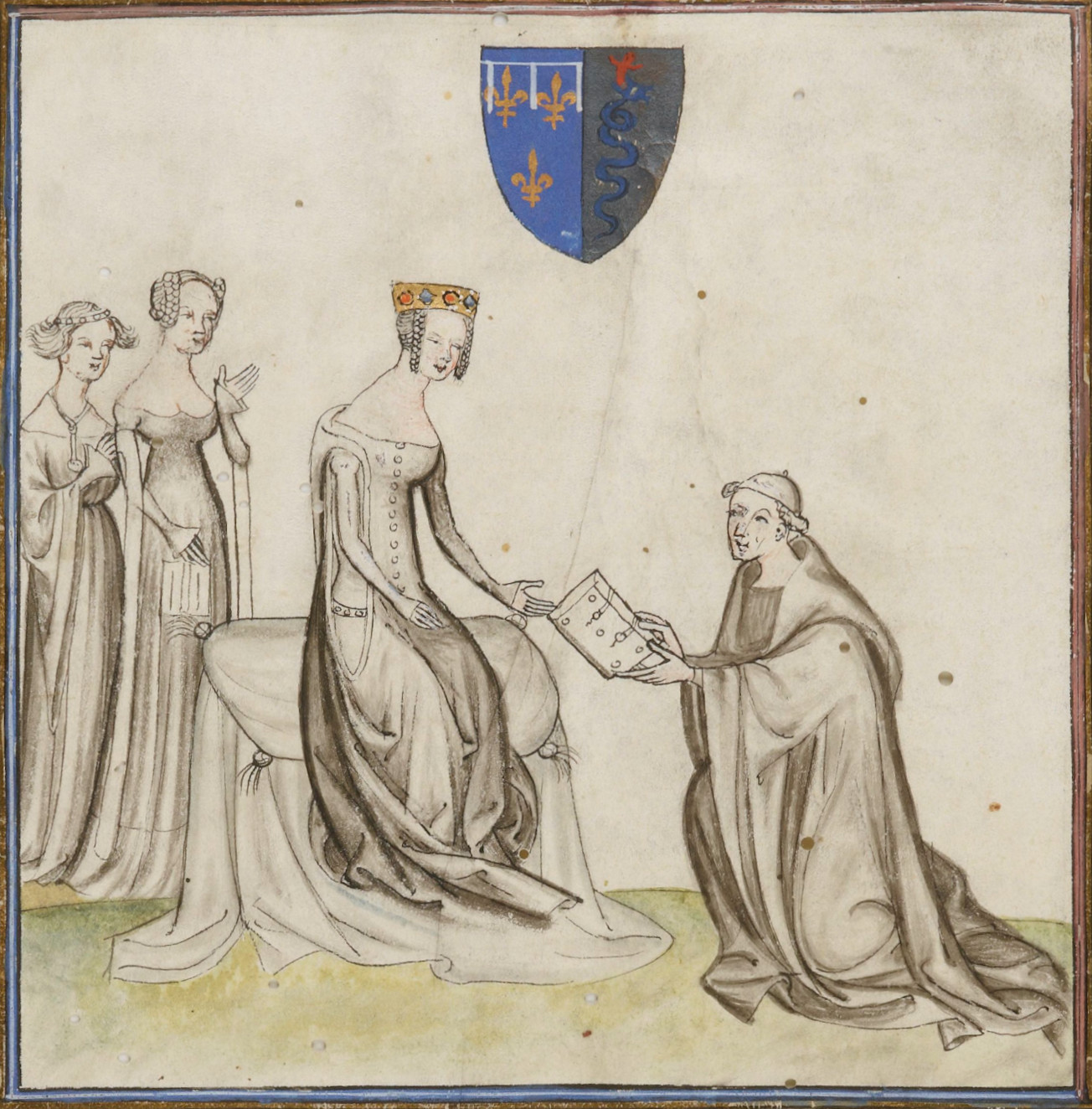
Honoré Bonet presenting his work to Valentine Visconti, Duchess of Orléans

Honoré Bonet also known as Honorat Bovet and Honoré Bouvet and by the alias Carobovis (c. 1350 – c. 1410) was a Provençal Benedictine, writer, heraldist and legal adviser. He was the prior of Selonnet. His work L'arbre des batailles on war, chivalry and the laws of war was very influential and became a guidebook for knights and men-at- arms in their conduct of war. He was in the service of King Charles VI of France and attempted to resolve the Schism in the Catholic Church through his literary and diplomatic activities.

== Life ==
He was born in the Provence in a family established in the Viscounty of Valernes, near Sisteron. He took his monastic vows in 1368 at the Benedictine monastery of Île Barbe in Lyon (where he was elected abbot in 1399). In 1328 he was a student of canon law in Montpellier. He likely later followed pope Urban V to Italy. In 1371 he left his post of prior of Sainte-Marie de Bayons in the diocese of Embrun for that of prior of Selonnet in the same diocese. In the same year he is granted a degree in canon law. 14 May 1382 he became a priest and received his licentiate in canon law. In the spring of 1386, Jean Le Fèvre, Chancellor of the Duchy of Anjou, sent him on several missions to secure the allegiance of the people of the Sisteron region to the Duchy of Anjou. On 23 October 1386, he was awarded an honorary doctorate in canon law from the University of Avignon by the bishop Jean Le Fèvre.

At the beginning of the Western Schism (1378), he was an ardent defender of pope Clement VII's Avignon party until the latter's death in 1394. From 1390 onwards, he entered the service of King Charles VI of France, who granted him an annual pension in 1392 and entrusted him with various missions. While in the service of the French king, Bouvet worked to bring the Schism in the Catholic Church to an end through his literary and diplomatic activities. He thus used a meeting between Charles VI and the Duke of Aquitaine John of Gaunt at Amiens in spring of 1202 to argue with the English Duke over the strength of the claims to the papacy of the rival popes. Two years later he teamed up with the Paris theologian Jean Gerson to set in motion a negotiated solution to the Schism. He also redacted between June and October 1394 a lengthy piece on the subject entitled Somnium super materia scismatis (A dream about the subject of the Schism). In the piece written in Latin, the Church, overwhelmed by misfortune, appears to the author in a dream and urges him to go and convince the principal kings and princes of Christendom to work towards resolving the Schism.

In 1390, he was one of the commissioners sent to Guyenne and Languedoc to investigate complaints lodged against the Duke of Berry. He spent several months in the Kingdom of Aragon between 1387 and 1392. When the abbot of the abbey of Île Barbe, Jean de Sogneto, died in early October of 1399, the monks led by their chief prior immediately convened their chapter to elect a new abbot. Bonet was on 5 October elected by the unanimous vote of the monks and, represented in his absence by Guillaume Rata, he was solemnly enthroned as the new abbot. Bonet was absent because he was away leading on behalf of the King of France a diplomatic mission to the Prague court of king Wenceslaus IV of Bohemia to whom he delivered to the King a speech in favour of resolving the Schism. From Prague Bonet appointed six proxies to ask the archbishop of Lyon to confirm his election as abbot. On 28 February 1401, four monks of Île Barbe, headed by the Chamberlain, Étienne de Vernet, challenged the validity of Bouvet's election as abbot of Île Barbe before Philippe de Thurey, the archbishop of Lyon, claiming several irregularities in the election of Bonet and that they now had the right to elect a new abbot. The procurator-general, André Marini, pleading on behalf of the archbishop, supported the claim that the election was void but asserted that the archbishop himself had the right to appoint the new abbot. Unsurprisingly, on 3 March 1401, the archbishop followed the plea of Marini and annulled Bonet's election and appointed the Savoyard nobleman, Aynard de Cordon, as a compromise candidate for the position. The loss of the income from the role of abbot may have been a reason why Bonet retired from the service of the king of France.

From 1402 onwards, he retired to the Provence, either to his priory in Selonnet or to the court of Louis II, Duke of Anjou and Count of Provence, in Aix-en-Provence. At the court he is documented in 1404 as holding the positions of maître-rational, advisor to the king and lieutenant du juge-mage. On 25 October 1406 he appeared on a list of members of the royal council and was still in the service of Louis II on 11 August 1408. On 22 January 1409, he is appointed by the assembly of the clergy of the Provence to be one of their representatives to the 1409 Council of Pisa which aimed to resolve the Schism. He gave his support to the sentence of deposition of popes Benedict XIII and Gregory XII. He probably died shortly afterwards.

== Work ==
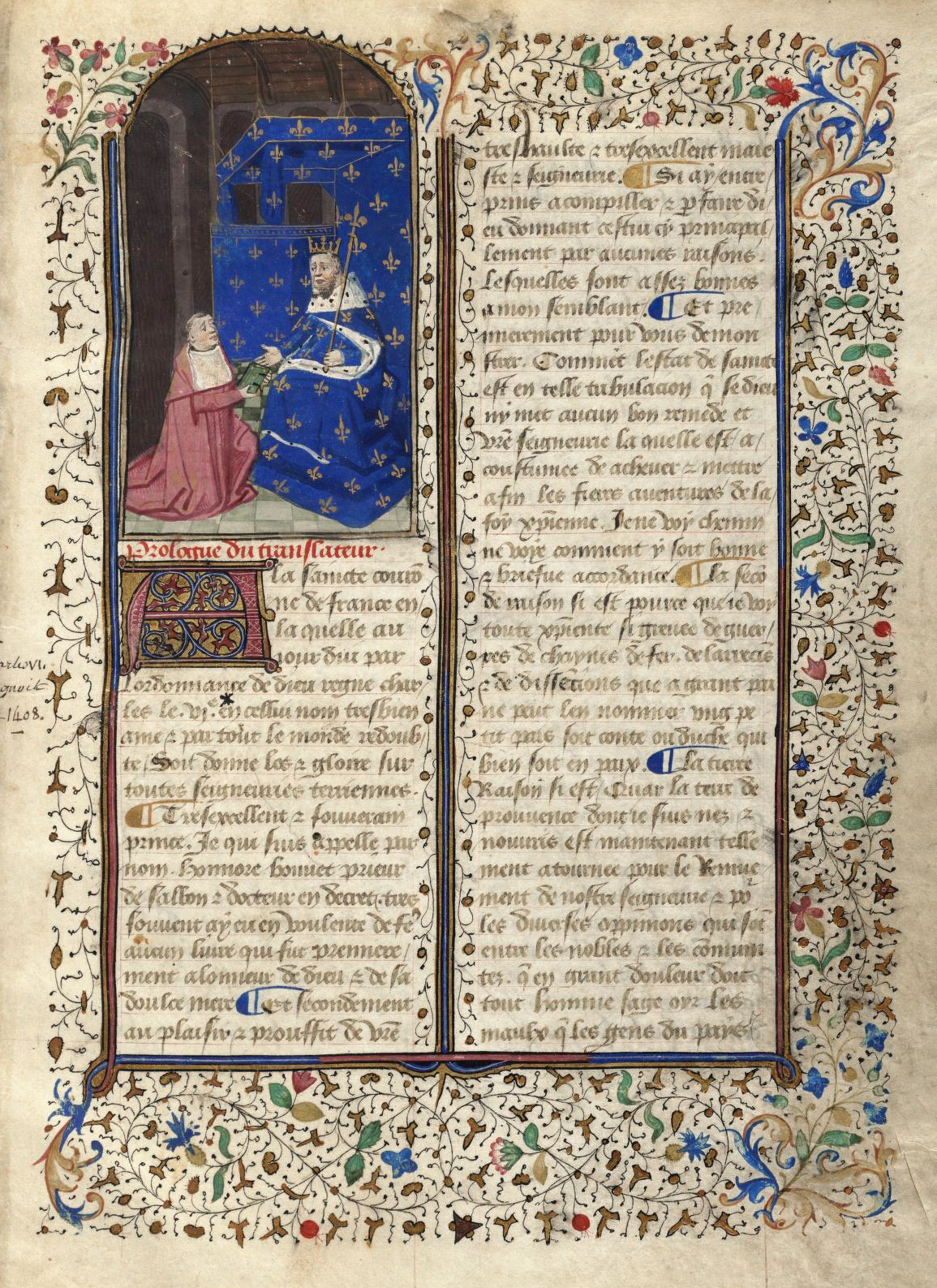
15th-century manuscript of Bonet's L'arbre des batailles

Bonnet wrote on philosophy, law, politics, heraldry and history. In his work L'arbre des batailles (The Tree of Battles) (c. 1382-87) Bonet deals with war, chivalry and the laws of war. The book is written in the form of a scholastic dialogue: each chapter starts with a yes–no question, proceeds with a dialogue, and concludes. The book was written to obtain favour of Charles VI of France, but without much effect. It became a manual for military commanders and was kept by many European rulers and gentlemen in their libraries. In 1456 it was translated to English in the Rosslyn castle for Gilbert de la Haye, Chancellor of Scotland, Earl of Orkney and Caithness.

Bonet was deeply influenced by Bartolo de Sassoferrato and Bonet himself was very influential in the 15th century. The 'Arbre des batailles' was a main source for Christine de Pizan's 'Livre des fais d'armes et de chevalerie' (Book of Deeds of Arms and of Chivalry), and her writing was in turn popularized by William Caxton in England. Jean Courtois, herald of Alfonso V of Aragon, also used Bonet extensively in his 'Blason des Couleurs'.

The Dutch-Israelian historian Martin van Creveld writes that Bonet's subject "was not so much military theory and practice as the art of 'chivalry' and the rules of war." According to van Creveld, such works "are little more than handbooks... Taking the formations and armament of their own day more or less for granted, however, they seldom rise above the specifics of time and place... The fact that some of them were in actual use until 1700 and beyond shows how indebted early modern Europe felt itself to the ancient world—or, conversely, how slow the evolution of warfare was. Unlike the Chinese classics they do not provide a coherent philosophy of war."

Other works by Bonet are L'Apparicion maistre Jehan de Meun and the Somnium super materia scismatis (1394).

== Editions and translations ==
- The first French edition Lyon 1481. Thereafter it was published several times.
- The Tree of Battles of Honoré Bonet, translated by G. W. Coopland, Liverpool: At the University Press, 1949.
