= Mille regretz =

Sixteenth-century French chanson

Mille Regretz sung by Collegium Vocale

Mille regretz is a four-voice chanson from the 16th century whose common attribution to Josquin des Prez is strongly put into question. The song evidently draws some of its melodic material from Josquin's securely attributed five-voice Du mien amant.

Mille regretz was a favourite of the Emperor Charles V and it is known in Spanish as La canción del Emperador. Apart from its plangent simplicity, musicians were presumably attracted by the royal connection: Spanish reworkings from the 16th-century include a mass setting by Cristóbal de Morales and variations for vihuela by Luis de Narváez and there is a chanson (SATTBB) by court composer Nicolas Gombert.

Text:
Mille regretz de vous abandonner
Et d'eslonger vostre fache amoureuse,
Jay si grand dueil et paine douloureuse,
Quon me verra brief mes jours definer.

In Modern French:
Mille regrets de vous abandonner
et de m'éloigner de votre visage amoureux.
J’ai si grand deuil et peine douloureuse
qu’on verra vite mes jours prendre fin.

English Translation:
A thousand regrets at deserting you
and leaving behind your loving face,
I feel so much sadness and such painful distress,
that it seems to me my days will soon dwindle away.

Translations differ in their interpretation of the words 'fache/face amoureuse' in line 2 (variously "amorous anger" or "loving face").
