= Johannes Rietstap =

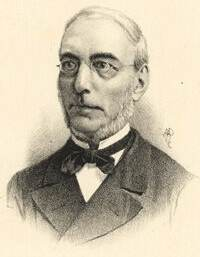
Johannes Baptista Rietstap in 1861

Johannes Baptista Rietstap (12 May 1828 – 24 December 1891) was a Dutch heraldist and genealogist. His monumental work the Armorial Général contains the blazons of the coats of arms of more than 130,000 European families.

== Personal life ==
Rietstap was born in 1828 in Rotterdam to Elizabeth Hermina Remmert. His father, Willem Hendrick Rietstap, was an accountant and insurance agent. His first job was at a bookstore, and he was then shortly assigned to a position on the newspaper Nieuwe Rotterdamsche Courant. While working there, Rietstap became interested in the history and theory of heraldry.

At age 25 Rietstap decided that he would learn Latin. When the commissioners of his newspaper told him that they wanted one of the editors to know Spanish, he mastered this language, as well. Rietstap did not stay long in the editorial offices. In November 1850 he accepted a position with the Stenographical Department of the Chambers of the Staten-Generaal which had been formed the year before and this position became full-time and permanent in 1852. Shortly after this, Rietstap married Johanna Maria de Haas on 16 September 1857. The couple were childless.

== Publishing career ==
Rietstap's first publications mainly stemmed from his multilingual abilities. He translated works of non-fiction, historical and romantic novels, and travel journals in French, German, and English. He continued to work as a translator into the early 1870s. His greatest contributions in the world of publishing related to his hobby of heraldry, though. He focused mostly on personal heraldry of families, and much less on civic heraldry. During this period he published the Handboek der Wapenkunde (Manual of Heraldry) which was an important addition to the body of work on Dutch heraldry. It has been expanded and updated and remains a standard work on the subject.

In 1861, Rietstap first published his Armorial général, contenant la description des armoiries des familles nobles et patriciennes de l'Europe, précédé d'un dictionnaire des termes du blason. This work contained the blazons of almost 50,000 noble families in Europe. They were organized alphabetically by surname. He made extensive use of heraldic sources in a variety of languages to compile the Armorial. As word spread of the publication, he made more heraldic contacts around Europe and was able to expand the work to two volumes in 1884 and 1887.

In 1871, European interest in heraldry was growing, thanks in part to Rietstap's work. Capitalizing on this, he was able to begin publication of a heraldic magazine. Specifically, he hoped that the Heraldieke Bibliotheek (Heraldic Library) would expose Dutch readers to the wider heraldic world. In 1872, he went to press with the subtitle "Magazine for Heraldry, Genealogy, Seals and Medals." The magazine would be published until 1882, and was mostly filled with articles written by Rietstap himself.

In the 1880s Rietstap also published two studies of the genealogy and coats of arms of the Dutch nobility, the Wapenboek der Nederlandschen Adel (Armory of the Dutch Nobility) which became available between 1880 and 1887 and De Wapens van den Tegenwoordigen en den Vroegeren Nederlandschen Adel met Genealogische en Heraldische Aanteekeningen (The Arms of Present and Past Dutch Nobility with Genealogical and Heraldic Annotations) published in 1890. In the prologue of this work, Rietstap continued his critique of the development of spelling in the Dutch language and heraldic blazon.

== Legacy ==
Throughout his years publishing career, Rietstap had continued his in his position with the Stenographical Department. He had made quite a career for himself and from January 1887 held the position of First Stenographer. Three and a half years later he resigned from this honored post, and one year later he died on Christmas Eve of 1891.

Rietstap is often considered the founder of modern heraldry in the Netherlands. He established a theoretical foundation for heraldry, especially by creating an understanding for Dutch terms. He brought the development of European heraldry within reach of the Dutch language through translations and editorials.
