= Carnation (tincture) =

Heraldic tincture

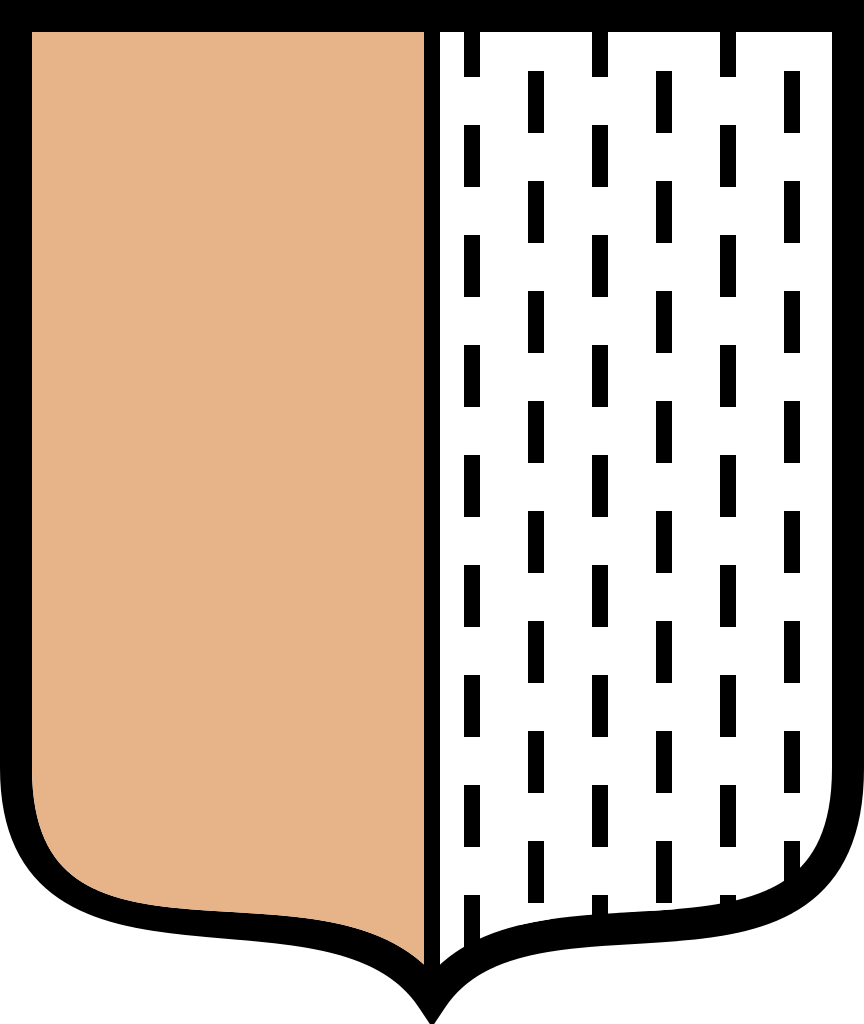
Carnation tincture

Coat of arms of Lavoûte-Chilhac, France: D'argent à la main de carnation tenant une croix de sable. (Argent, a hand carnation holding a cross sable)

In heraldry, carnation is a tincture used for skin colour.

It is rare in coats of arms in Anglophone countries but quite frequent on the European continent, in France in particular, derived from widespread use in German heraldry. In its rare appearances in Anglophone armory; it is not only used for European flesh tones, as in a crown rayonny or supported by two cubit arms, dexter carnation, sinister skeletal proper (crest of The Royal Australian and New Zealand College of Radiologists) but is also used for a general pink colouring as in a horse passant argent bridled saddled and trappings or, on its head a plume of three feathers carnation (crest of The Worshipful Company of Saddlers, England).

The word comes from Middle French carnation, literally 'flesh colour', from Latin carnatiō, derived from the word carō, carnis, carnem meaning 'flesh' or 'meat'. The flower carnation is named after the color.

Examples of carnation
Hex	#F7DCC7	#FFD1B7	#FBC5A7	#F6B78B	#F0A96F
CMYK	(0, 10, 15, 0)	(0, 18, 28, 0)	(0, 20, 25, 0)	(0, 26, 44, 4)	(0, 30, 54, 6)
RGB	(247, 220, 199)	(255, 209, 183)	(251, 197, 167)	(246, 183, 139)	(240, 169, 111)
HSV	(26°, 19%, 97%)	(24°, 28%, 100%)	(21°, 33%, 98%)	(24°, 44%, 96%)	(29°, 54%, 94%)
