= Clément Prinsault =

Clément Prinsault was a 15th-century French heraldist.

Prinsault was strongly influenced by Bartolo de Sassoferrato. His book Traité du blason (1465), was one of the earliest writings on heraldry.

His book consists of two parts – Traité and Armorial. Part I consists of 12 chapters.

1. De ceulx qui premier trouvèrent armes (he names Alexander the Great and Hector as the first armigers)
2. De quelle maniére on fait armes (all coat of arms have three elements: metals [de métal], colours [de couleur], and furs [de penne])
3. Quantes métax, quantes couleurs et quantes pennes il y a en armes et comment on les doit blasonner (how to describe the metals, colours, and furs)
4. A quelle vertu, quelle complexion, quelle des sept planettes, quel des XII signes célestes, quelle pierre précieuse, quel jour de la sepmaine, quel des III élémens et quel métal signifie en armes chascun desdits métalxs et coleurs (deals with the relation of metals and colours to virtues, seven planets, 12 celestial signs, gemstones, weekdays, 3 elements)
5. Le chapittre contient IX choses dont chascune desquelles fait le tiers de l'escu, et quant elle est plus petile, c'est devise (deals with ordinaries)
6. Démonstre jusques à quel nombre on doit nombrer toutes choses... et quant on doit dire sans nombre ou semé (deals with field treatments, and their maximal numbers like semé, checkered etc.)
7. Fait mention de la disposition des métalx ou couleurs ou blason, et comment on peut discerner les faulses armes des vrayes (deals with the composition of colours and metals in the field, and their unproper manners)
8. En quelle partie de l'escu on doit commencer à blasonner (deals with the right blazon)
9. De certaines différences d'oyseaux et bestes ou blason d'armes (deals with certain birds and animals in the arms)
10. How to blazon the lion and leopard in heraldry
11. En quelle façon sont en armes besans, torteaux, cotire etc., et quelle différence il y a entre crois etc. (deals with roundles, crosses etc.)
12. Démonstre la maniére de blasonner XV escur difficilles cy aprés contenus avecques la conclusion de ce présent livre (examples of heraldic blazon).

== Works ==
His work has several French language manuscripts in Bibliothèque nationale de France (BnF): Ms. Fr. 5936, Fr. 5939, Fr. 6129, Fr. 14357, Fr. 18651.

== See also ==
- Tricking (heraldry)
