= Mary Henrietta Dering Curtois =

British artist

Mary Curtois
- Born: Mary Henrietta Dering Curtois; 5 May 1854; Branston, Lincolnshire, England
- Died: 6 October 1928 (aged 74)
- Education: Lincoln School of Art; Académie Julian
- Known for: Painting

Mary Henrietta Dering Curtois (1854–1928), known professionally as Dering Curtois, was a British artist, known for painting genre scenes, landscapes and portraits.

== Biography ==
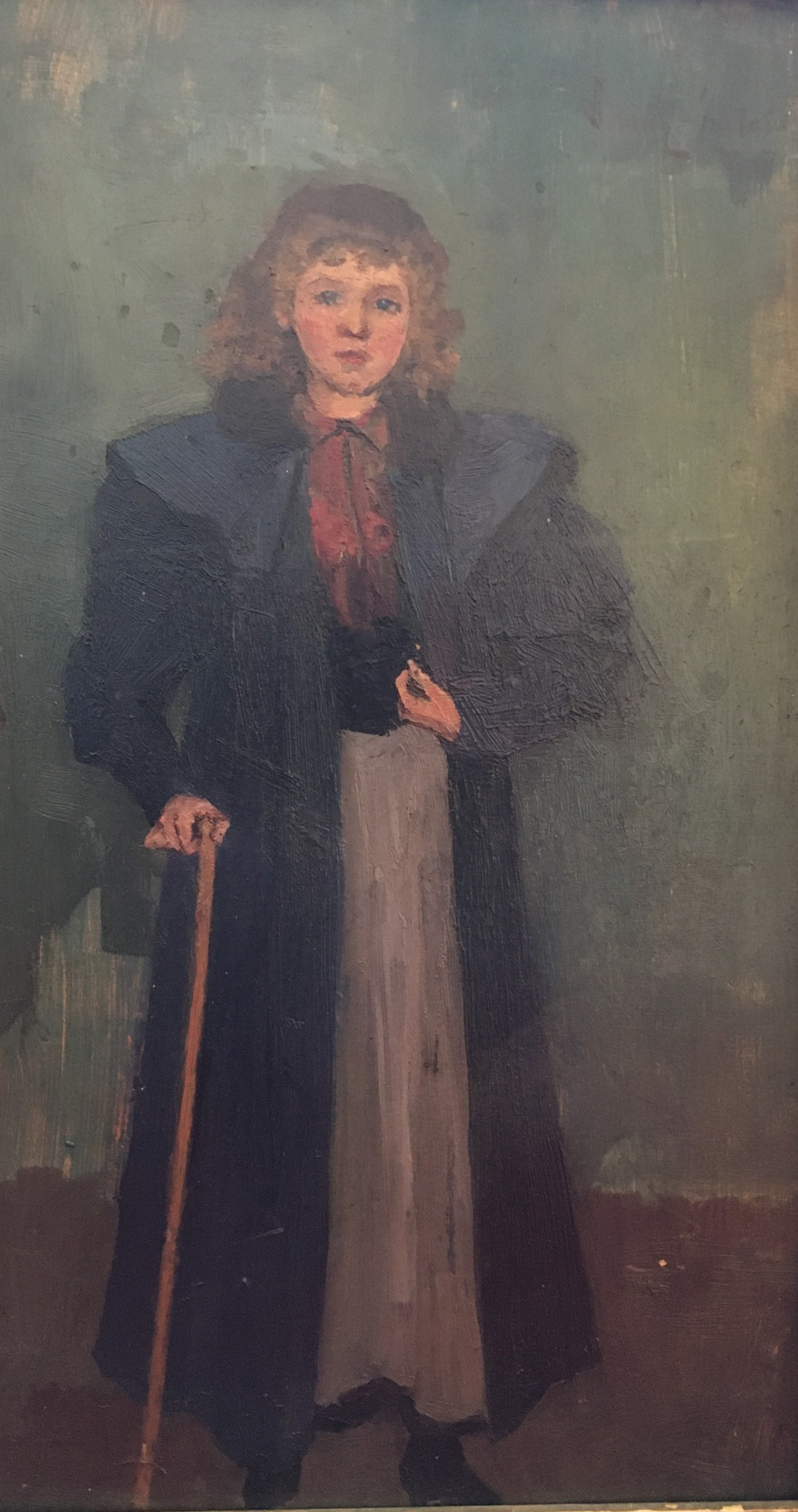
Lily Digges by Curtois

Curtois was born at Branston in Lincolnshire and studied art at the Lincoln School of Art and also in London and in Paris at the Académie Julian. She exhibited at a number of London galleries including, between 1887 and 1902, at the New Gallery and also showed six works at the Royal Academy. Between 1887 and 1928 Curtois also exhibited works with the Society of Women Artists.

Curtois lived at Washingborough Manor near Lincoln and in London, until later in life when she moved to Little Missenden in Buckinghamshire where she was an active member of the Buckinghamshire Art Society. Both the Usher Gallery in Lincoln and Canterbury Museums and Galleries hold examples of her work. Her sister, Ella Rose Curtois, was a sculptor.
