= Ella Rose Curtois =

British artist (1860-1944)

- Born: 23 March 1860; Branston, Lincolnshire
- Died: 23 March 1944 (aged 84); Paris, France
- Known for: Sculpture

Ella Rose Curtois (23 March 1860 – 23 March 1944) was a British artist, known for her sculptures in marble and terracotta.

== Biography ==
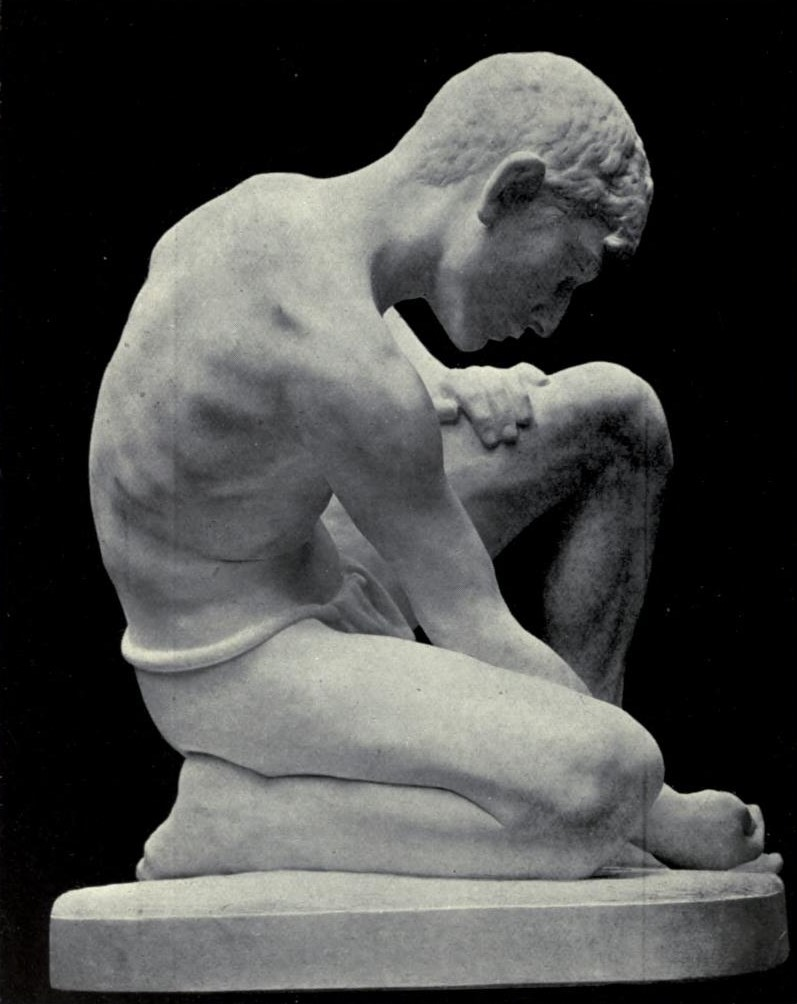
Child Playing at Marbles by Curtois

Curtois was born at Branston in Lincolnshire. Her parents were Atwill Curtois, rector of the village, and his wife Anne Henrietta, who had eleven children between them. Ella Rose Curtois created sculpture pieces in both marble and terracotta, usually of genre subjects and portraits. Between 1885 and 1897 Curtois exhibited several works at the Royal Academy in London and at the Paris Salon. Ella Rose Curtois and her father were responsible for carving the choir screen in Branston church, most of which was destroyed in a fire on Christmas Day 1962. However, several of her carvings were saved and remounted in the casing of a new church organ.

Curtois lived most of her life in London and in Paris where she died during World War II. Her will left a few small legacies to a friend, but the residue went to the Usher Gallery in Lincoln and was used to erect a new gallery which was opened there in 1959. One of her sisters, Mary Henrietta Dering Curtois was a painter and artist of some note.
