= Jean Courtois (herald) =

French herald (died 1436)

Jean Courtois (French pronunciation: [ʒɑ̃ kuʁtwa]; died ca. 1437 or 1438) was a French herald.

== Biography ==
Jean Courtois, who became known as Sicily Herald, was in the service of the king of the two Sicilies Alfonso V of Aragon. He lived for a long time in Mons in Hainaut in the Netherlands. At the beginning of his career, he was in the service of Peter of Luxembourg, Count of Saint-Pol, and then he acted in the Naples court of Alfonso V of Aragon.

In his work Le Blason des Couleurs en armes, livrées, & devises (1414), Courtois developed a heraldic system consisting of the tinctures, planets and carbuncles, the virtues, metals, months, the zodiac, and weekdays among others. He claimed his work was compiled with "the help of God (l'Aide de Dieu), princes, knights, squires and all his brothers, kings of arms and heralds". He was familiar with the Etymologies of Isidore of Seville, and also he gave the names of the tinctures in Greek. However, his main contribution was the development of gemstone-planetary blazon. Historians of colours regard this as an important text, because it contains an extensive discussion on the significance of colour in coats of arms.

== Editions ==
- Trattato dei colori nelle arme, nelle livre e nelle divise. (Naples, manuscript in Italian. New edition, Pavia: A. Viani, 1593).
- A French language edition: Le blason des couleurs en armes, livrées et divises (H. Cocheris, Paris, 1860)
