= Jean Courtois (composer) =

French composer

Jean Courtois (French pronunciation: [ʒɑ̃ kuʁtwa]; fl. 1530–1545) was a composer of the Franco-Flemish School of the generation after Josquin des Prez. He was maitre de chapelle to the Archbishop of Cambrai in present-day France. His motet Venite populi terrae was written to celebrate Emperor Charles V and was performed in the Cathedral; the Emperor would have heard it in 1539 on his march to suppress the Revolt of Ghent. He wrote around 20 chansons, 15 motets, and 2 masses. Courtois’ work exhibits the varied imitative procedures and shifting textural treatment which typify the Franco-Netherlandish motet style. The chansons, for 4 voices, are in the "Parisian" style of the day; the works for 5 or 6 voices are in the more contrapuntal "Netherlandish" style.

== See also ==
- Renaissance music
