= Bruce Patterson (officer of arms) =

Canadian officer of arms

Bruce K. Patterson AIH FRHSC
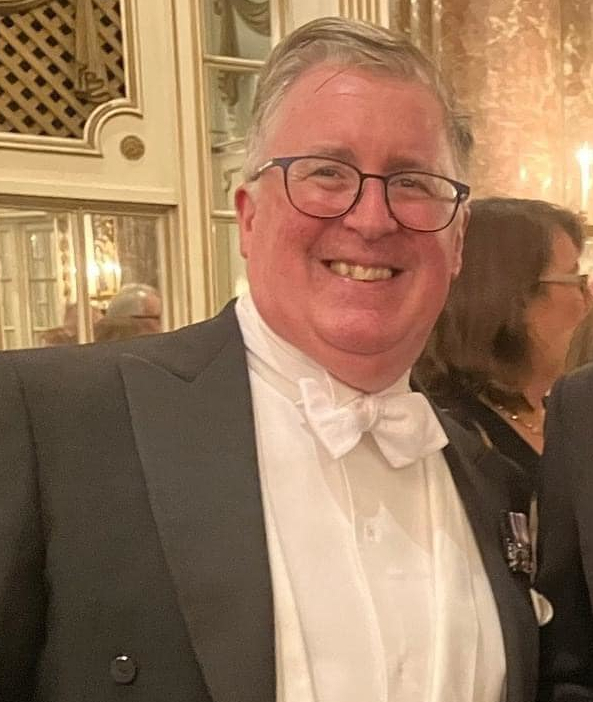
- Patterson in 2024 at the 36th International Congress of Genealogical and Heraldic Sciences in Boston.

Deputy Chief Herald of Canada
- Incumbent
- Assumed office 2010
- Preceded by: Claire Boudreau

Personal details
- Born: Bruce Kenneth Patterson; 1967 (age 58–59)
- Education: University of Trinity College (B.A.), University of Western Ontario (B.Ed.).
- Occupation: Civil servant
- Profession: Officer of arms

Bruce Kenneth Patterson (born 1967) is a Canadian officer of arms at the Canadian Heraldic Authority who has been serving as Deputy Chief Herald of Canada since 2010 as well as Saint-Laurent Herald and Registrar since 2008.

== Life and career ==
Patterson graduated from the University of Trinity College, where he obtained a Bachelor of Arts degree, and also from the University of Western Ontario, wherein he obtained his Bachelor of Education. Prior to working in the heraldic field, Patterson worked as a teacher first in Hungary and later in Toronto as a secondary school teacher for English and history.

In the 1990s, he was a member of the Board of Directors of the Heraldry Society of Canada (later Royal Heraldry Society of Canada) at both the National and Toronto Branch levels. From 1994 to 2000 he edited the Toronto Branch publication Hogtown Heraldry, and drew cartoons and some other illustrations for the Canadian Heraldic Primer published by the Society. In 2000, he was appointed Saguenay Herald at the Canadian Heraldic Authority, a role in which he served until his promotion to Saint-Laurent Herald and Registrar in 2008. In 2010, he would be further appointed as Deputy Chief Herald of Canada alongside his existing role.

== Honours ==
Patterson was appointed as a fellow of the Royal Heraldry Society of Canada in 1998 and is an associate of the Académie internationale d'Héraldique. He was created a Companion of the Roll of Honour of the Memorial of Merit of King Charles the Martyr in 2021.

Ribbon	Description	Notes	Ref
	Member of the Order of St. John	Appointed Member in 2000	
	Queen Elizabeth II Golden Jubilee Medal for Canada	Awarded in 2002	
	Queen Elizabeth II Diamond Jubilee Medal for Canada	Awarded in 2012	

== Arms ==
Coat of arms of Bruce Patterson
Adopted October 20, 2005 (grant from the Canadian Heraldic Authority) Crest A demi-panther guardant Gules incensed proper semé of cinquefoils, grasping in the dexter paw a fire-steel Or Escutcheon Gyronny Gules and Argent, a cross gyronny counterchanged Motto LET MY COUNSEL BE A KINDLY LIGHT Badge On a roundel per pale Gules and Sable a pelican in its piety Argent beaked and nested Or Other versions Arms of office as Deputy Chief Herald of Canada (2010-): Per pale, dexter Gules an inescutcheon Argent charged with a maple leaf Gules and ensigned by a coronet erablé Argent jewelled Gules, all within a bordure Argent; sinister Gyronny Gules and Argent, a cross gyronny counterchanged

Heraldic offices
Preceded by Claire Boudreau	Deputy Chief Herald of Canada; 2010–present	Incumbent
Preceded by Claire Boudreau	Saint-Laurent Herald; 2008–present	Incumbent
Preceded by Claire Boudreau	Saguenay Herald; 2000–2008	Succeeded by Karine Constantineau
