= Canadian heraldry =

Canadian coats of arms and other heraldic achievements

- Royal coat of arms of Canada
- Heraldic tradition: Gallo-British
- Governing body: Canadian Heraldic Authority
- Chief officer: Samy Khalid, Chief Herald of Canada

Canadian heraldry is the cultural tradition and style of coats of arms and other heraldic achievements in both modern and historic Canada. It includes national, provincial, and civic arms, noble and personal arms, ecclesiastical heraldry, heraldic displays as corporate logos, and Canadian blazonry.

Derived mainly from heraldic traditions in France and the United Kingdom, Canadian heraldry also incorporates distinctly Canadian symbols, especially native flora and fauna, references to the Indigenous peoples of Canada, and uniquely Canadian elements such as the Canadian pale, derived from the Canadian flag. A unique system of cadency is used for daughters inheriting arms, and a special symbol for United Empire Loyalists.

In 1988, governance of both personal and corporate heraldry in Canada was patriated from the heraldic authorities in England and Scotland, with the formation of the Canadian Heraldic Authority, which now has exclusive jurisdiction over granting awards of arms in Canada. Coats of arms are used throughout Canada by all levels of government, in many cases including royal insignia as a mark of authority, an example being the arms of the House of Commons and the Senate, and of Parliament as a combined body. Use of armorial bearings is not limited to governmental bodies; all citizens of Canada have the right to petition for an award of arms, as do other entities including businesses and religious institutions. The granting of arms is regarded as an honour from the king of Canada, via his viceregal representative, the governor general of Canada, and thus are generally bestowed only on those whom the chief herald has deemed worthy of receiving a grant of arms.

== History ==
Royal arms of France (modern)

Coat of arms of Nova Scotia

Before the arrival of Europeans, the Indigenous peoples of Canada used symbolic artwork to denote their allegiance to a particular clan or pantribal sodalities, and to show legendary and religious themes. For the Indigenous peoples of the Pacific Northwest Coast this would be done with carvings on totem poles. carvings integrated into longhouses and smaller wooden objects like boxes, masks, and canoes. For the Indigenous peoples of the Great Plains the hide painting tradition painted images onto tipis, shields, and other animal-hide objects.

The history of European-style heraldry in Canada began with the raising of the royal arms of France (modern) by French explorer Jacques Cartier in 1534, when he landed on Canadian soil at what is now known as the Gaspé Peninsula. From the beginning of the settlement of Canada until the Treaty of Paris in 1763, armorial bearings were largely either brought from France or awarded by the French crown. A notable exception is the coat of arms of Nova Scotia, awarded in 1625 by Charles I (making it the oldest coat of arms in the Commonwealth outside the United Kingdom), in use until 1868, when it was replaced by a new achievement. The original was later rediscovered, and replaced the 1868 version in 1929. The present-day coat of arms of Newfoundland and Labrador was granted to a private company shortly after that of Nova Scotia, although it did not enter use as the region's arms until the 1920s. The coat of arms of the Hudson's Bay Company was first used in 1671 (although no record of the original grant exists, and it was not registered with the College of Arms in London until 1921) and has been in continual use with minor cosmetic changes to the official depiction ever since.

Upon ratification of the Treaty of Paris, the British Crown confirmed the French awards of arms. Between 1763 and 1867, the year of Canadian Confederation, there is little evidence of much heraldic activity. After Confederation, however, heraldry in Canada became more widespread, including grants of arms to the provinces, various educational institutions, municipalities, and individuals. In the immediate post-Confederation period, arms were granted to New Brunswick, Nova Scotia, Ontario, and Quebec, although not to the country as a whole. In the period between the Treaty of Paris and Confederation, the Arms of the United Kingdom had served as the emblem of authority within Canada.

From 1763 until 1988, heraldry in Canada was under the authority of the College of Arms in London and the Court of the Lord Lyon in Edinburgh. In the late 1980s, the Queen issued letters patent authorizing the governor general to exercise her authority in heraldic matters. The governor general then established the Canadian Heraldic Authority.

== Modern heraldry ==
=== Official ===
Now know Ye that We, by and with the advice of our Privy Council of Canada, do by these presents authorise and empower Our Governor General of Canada to exercise or provide for the exercise of all power and authorities lawfully belonging to Us as Queen of Canada in respect of the granting of armorial bearings in Canada.

— From the Letters Patent,1988

Before the creation of the Canadian Heraldic Authority, Canadians wishing to obtain a legally granted coat of arms had to apply to one of the two heraldic offices in the United Kingdom: either the College of Arms in London or, if of Scottish descent, the Court of the Lord Lyon in Edinburgh. This process was quite lengthy—and costly. In addition, the heralds in Britain could sometimes be unfamiliar with Canadian history and symbols. In time, many Canadians with an interest in heraldry began calling for an office that would offer armorial bearings designed by and for Canadians.

As early as 1967, plans were reportedly in the works to transfer overview of heraldry from the College of Arms in the UK to Canada. The push for a wholly Canadian heraldic system came largely from the Heraldry Society of Canada (now the Royal Heraldry Society of Canada) almost from its inception, though it was not seen as a priority by successive national governments. In 1986, Vicki Huntington, a politician from British Columbia, forwarded a brief written by the Royal Heraldry Society of Canada calling for the creation of the Canadian Heraldic Authority to a staff member in then-Secretary of State David Crombie's office. Mr. Crombie had his department organize a meeting in Ottawa the following year, to which many national and international heraldic experts were invited. The meeting concluded with "a strong recommendation to government that an Authority be created."

Two years later, on 4 June 1988, then-Governor General Jeanne Sauvé authorized the creation of the Canadian Heraldic Authority, made possible by letters patent signed by Queen Elizabeth II, on the advice of her Canadian Privy Council, and presented by her son, Prince Edward. As a result, Canada became the first Commonwealth realm outside the United Kingdom to have its own heraldic authority. Canada also provides full equality to women in terms of inheriting and transmitting arms. Additionally, all armigers within Canada may file for trademark protection of their grant of arms under the Trade-Marks Act.

=== State and national ===
1923–1957

1957–1994

1994-present

Depictions of the Arms of the Sovereign in Right of Canada

The royal arms of Canada are the official coat of arms of the Canadian monarch and thus also of Canada. They incorporate many distinctive Canadian elements such as the maple leaves, and the reference to the French royal arms in the fourth quarter which replace or add to those derived from the British.

The arms are used as a mark of authority by various government agencies and representatives, including the Prime Minister and Cabinet, the Speaker of the House of Commons, some courts and, formerly, Parliament, and on the cover of Canadian passports. From 1962 until her death in 2022, a banner of the arms, defaced with a variant of the Queen's cypher, formed the Royal Standard of Canada, for use by the Canadian sovereign. The personal flag of the governor general has featured the crest of the arms of Canada on a blue background since 1981.

On 15 February 2008, the House of Commons was granted its own heraldic symbol following a request by Commons Speaker Peter Milliken to the Canadian Heraldic Authority. The symbol for Parliament is a badge of the escutcheon in the Arms of Canada superimposed on the mace used by the House of Commons as a symbol of its authority derived from the Crown. The Senate was granted a similar badge on 15 April 2008, using its own mace. Parliament as a whole has been granted the right to use the escutcheon of the Arms of Canada, superimposed over the maces of the Commons and Senate in saltire.

In June 2008, MP Pat Martin introduced a motion into the House of Commons calling on the government to amend the coat of arms to incorporate symbols representing Canada's First Nations, Inuit and Métis peoples.

=== Provincial and territorial ===
Coats of arms of the provinces

Alberta

British Columbia

Manitoba

New Brunswick

Newfoundland And Labrador

Nova Scotia

Ontario

Prince Edward Island

Quebec

Saskatchewan

Flags of the lieutenant governors

British Columbia

Alberta

Manitoba

Saskatchewan

Ontario

Quebec

New Brunswick

Nova Scotia

Prince Edward Island

Newfoundland and Labrador

Coats of arms of the territories

Northwest Territories

Nunavut

Yukon

Flags of the commissioners of the territories

Northwest Territories

Nunavut

Yukon

In much the same way that there is a national coat of arms, each province and territory possesses its own unique arms; Saskatchewan's is known formally as Her Majesty's Arms in Right of Saskatchewan. The year after Confederation, Queen Victoria issued royal warrants assigning arms to Canada's original four provinces: Quebec, Ontario, Nova Scotia, and New Brunswick.

Each provincial coat of arms includes specific local symbolism; most also include symbolism derived from the coats of arms of the United Kingdom, France, or both. Since 1868, each province and territory within Canada has been granted arms through warrants either from the monarch directly or from the governor general, or has assumed them through other means.

Apart from Newfoundland and Labrador, each province and territory bears at least some elements from its coat of arms upon its flag. The flags of British Columbia, New Brunswick, Nova Scotia, and Prince Edward Island are banners of the provincial arms, while Alberta, Manitoba, Ontario, Saskatchewan, the Northwest Territories, and Yukon each have the shield of the local coat of arms on their flags, with other design elements. The flag of Nunavut uses some elements from its coat of arms along with other symbols and colours. The shield of the arms of each province, on a blue background and circled with ten gold maple leaves, the whole surmounted by a crown, forms the main element of the flag of the lieutenant governor of that province. Nova Scotia was the last to use the Union Flag defaced with the shield of Nova Scotia, surrounded by green maple leaves. Quebec uses the shield on a white circle with the provincial motto inscribed below.

=== Municipal ===
The use of armorial bearings among Canadian cities is inconsistent, because many of them have been assumed and brought into force by local governmental authorities, rather than granted from the Crown. Many municipal coats of arms either awarded or confirmed by the Canadian Heraldic Authority may be found within the Public Register of Arms, though the online version of the Register is not complete.

=== Personal ===
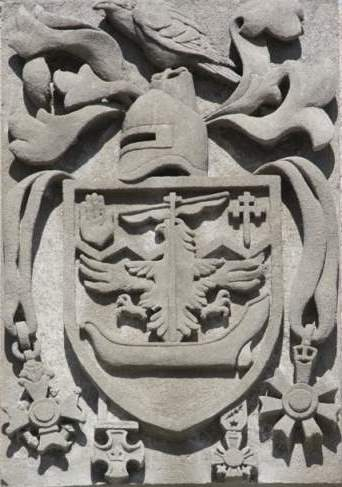
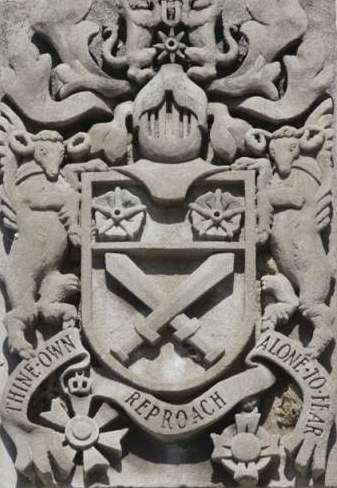
The arms of Lt Gen Sir Archibald Cameron Macdonell (L) and Gen Sir Arthur William Currie (R), Currie Building, Royal Military College of Canada

In Canada, every citizen has the right to petition the Crown for a grant of arms. Canadians who have been appointed to the Order of Canada are automatically entitled to receive an award of arms including the ribbon of the Order, or should they already be armigerous, to encircle their extant arms with the ribbon. Amongst others, all members of the Privy Council are entitled to supporters in their arms, as are the Speakers of the House of Commons and the Senate, Companions of the Order of Canada, Commanders of the Orders of Military Merit, Merit of the Police Forces, and of the Royal Victorian Order.

== Unique Canadian elements and practices ==
=== Indigenous symbolism ===
Due to the history of Canada, heraldry in the country has incorporated indigenous symbols and elements. The coat of arms of Nunavut, for example, includes elements such as an inukshuk, a qulliq, and an igloo, all of which are references to the Inuit who live in the area, while the arms of the Canadian Heraldic Authority include ravens, a First Nations symbol of creation and transformation. In addition, some Canadians choose to bear their arms on a roundel rather than a shield, a reference to a drumhead; an example is the coat of arms of Nunavut.

=== Cadency ===
In many systems of heraldry, the arms of each living person must be unique. English heraldry has used armorial variants to distinguish the arms of brothers from their father's arms and from each other since the 13th century; this is now normally done by the system of marks or brisures set up by the early Tudor herald John Writhe. Canada adds a unique series of brisures for use by female children who inherit arms. As in other heraldic systems, these cadency marks are not always used; in any case, when the heir succeeds (in Canada, this is normally the first child, whether male or female, according to strict primogeniture; however, the grantee may choose another person as heir), the mark of cadency is removed and the heir uses the plain coat of arms.

Brisures

	First	Second	Third	Fourth	Fifth	Sixth	Seventh	Eighth	Ninth
Daughter	Heart	An ermine spot	A snowflake	A fir twig as used in heraldry	A chess rook as used in heraldry	A scallop shell	An heraldic harp	An heraldic buckle	An heraldic clarichord
Daughter	heart	ermine spot	snowflake	fir twig	chess rook	escallop	harp	buckle	clarion
Son	An heraldic label	A crescent	An heraldic mullet (star of five points)	A martlet (bird)	An heraldic annulet (ring)	A fleur-de-lis	An heraldic rose	A cross moline, an equilateral cross with split and curved ends	A double quatrefoil, an eight-lobed radial shape
Son	label of three points	crescent	mullet	martlet	annulet	fleur-de-lys	rose	cross moline	double quatrefoil (Note: Also known as an octofoil)

=== Charges, ordinaries, and divisions of the field ===
The Canadian Pale, a pale division amounting to half the entire field, derived from the Canadian flag, is widely used in Canadian heraldry, while the Canadian fess, a similar horizontal division, has been used once. The term érablé, referring to maple leaves, is often used in Canadian arms. For example, as a tressure érablé in the arms of the Monarchist League of Canada, coronets érablé in the arms of Sudbury and Canada's National History Society, and as a partition much like engrailed or dancetty.

Canadian animals and birds, both real and fantastical, have also been widely used in arms, including the mythical raven-bears in the arms of the Canadian Heraldic Authority. Other uniquely Canadian symbols also appear in Canadian grants of armorial bearings, including the heraldic mark of the prime minister of Canada and the Canadian Royal Crown.

=== Status of women ===
In both the English and the Scottish systems of heraldry, from which the Canadian draws many of its practices, a woman does not inherit or transmit arms unless she is a heraldic heiress, that is, a daughter of an armiger who has no sons. In Canadian heraldry, by contrast, women may inherit arms on an equal basis with their brothers (if any). Women in Canada may also transmit their arms to their heirs, regardless of gender. This system of equality for men and women is a result of provisions in the Canadian Charter of Rights and Freedoms, which guarantee, among other things, freedom from discrimination under the law on the basis of sex.

=== United Empire Loyalists ===
Civil

Military

The Loyalist coronets

Those who are descended from the citizens loyal to the British Crown who fled the United States during and shortly after the revolution are known in Canada as United Empire Loyalists, and are entitled to the use of special coronets within their arms, if arms are granted to them. This possibility was introduced by the Canadian Heraldic Authority in 1989. There are two versions of the Loyalist coronet: the civil, which is made up of alternating oak and maple leaves, and the military, made up of maple leaves alternating with crossed swords; the latter is reserved for use by the families of those who served in the British military during the revolution. Proof of United Empire Loyalist ancestry must be provided to the Canadian Heraldic Authority before permission is granted to use the coronet in arms. Unlike the common use of coronets in heraldry, the Loyalist coronet denotes no rank of nobility or royalty, but instead alludes to ancestral allegiance.

=== Helmets ===
In Canadian heraldry, helmets play little role and are not blazoned; as such, the armiger can display their helm in whatever style they choose. One notable example of a non-traditional helmet used in Canadian heraldry is the arms of Julie Payette, Governor General 2017–2021, which bears an astronaut's helmet as the helm. Other examples include nasal helmets, Corinthian helmets, and parka hoods.

== Obtaining arms ==
All citizens of Canada, as well as corporate bodies, may petition the Crown for an award of arms. For an individual to obtain a grant of arms, a petition must be sent to the Chief Herald, providing a biography, references, and completed application forms. If the grant is approved, the individual then consults with heralds from the Authority to work out the design of their award. Upon completion of this process, the grant documents, in the form of letters patent, are created and provided to the grantee. The entire process is subject to certain fees required by the Government of Canada to cover costs of research and artwork; the fees are not to purchase the grant of arms. For corporations and institutions the process is similar.

Those individuals and institutions who are already armigerous through recognized heraldic authorities worldwide may apply to the Canadian Heraldic Authority to have their arms registered. There is no cost associated with application for registration, and it takes less time, approximately three months, than application for a new award of arms, which takes approximately twelve to fourteen months.

== See also ==
- Armorial of the governors general of Canada
- Canadian royal symbols
- List of Canadian flags
- National symbols of Canada
- Regional tartans of Canada
