= Claire Boudreau =

Canadian historian (1965–2020)

Claire Boudreau PhD AIH FRHSC
- Boudreau in 2017, with Julie Payette's patent

Chief Herald of Canada
- In office June 26, 2007 – May 20, 2020
- Monarch: Elizabeth II
- Governors General: Michaëlle Jean; David Johnston; Julie Payette
- Preceded by: Robert Watt
- Succeeded by: Samy Khalid

Personal details
- Born: August 18, 1965 Cape Breton, Nova Scotia, Canada
- Died: November 17, 2020 (aged 55) Ottawa, Ontario, Canada
- Spouse: James Wilkinson
- Occupation: Historian, officer of arms

Claire Boudreau (1965 – November 17, 2020) was a Canadian historian, genealogist, and officer of arms, serving as Chief Herald of Canada from June 26, 2007 to May 20, 2020.

== Life and career ==
Boudreau served as a herald in the Canadian Heraldic Authority beginning on March 17, 1997, when she was appointed to the office of Saguenay Herald. She would be promoted to Saint-Laurent Herald in 2000, succeeding Auguste Vachon on his retirement. Boudreau was the principal designer and administrator of the authority's pioneering online Public Register of Arms, Flags and Badges of Canada, which was unveiled in July 2005. Boudreau would later be appointed as the first Deputy Chief Herald of Canada on December 1, 2005, serving in this role until June 26, 2007, when she was made the second Chief Herald of Canada following the retirement of Robert Watt. In addition to her work as an officer of arms at the Canadian Heraldic Authority, Boudreau was also a nationally and internationally recognized scholar in heraldic studies and was the author of many articles and publications. On May 20, 2020, Boudreau retired and was succeeded as Chief Herald of Canada by Samy Khalid.

== Death ==
On November 18, 2020, it was announced that Boudreau died due to cancer at the age of 55.

== Honours ==
Boudreau was made an Academician of the Académie Internationale d'Héraldique in 2000 and a fellow of the Royal Heraldry Society of Canada in 2006. On May 20, 2020, Boudreau was appointed Margaree-Chéticamp herald emeritus on her retirement as Chief Herald of Canada.

Ribbon	Description	Notes	Ref
	Queen Elizabeth II Diamond Jubilee Medal for Canada	Awarded in 2012	

== Arms ==
Coat of arms of Claire Boudreau
Adopted April 15, 2004 (grant of arms and crest from the Canadian Heraldic Authority); November 15, 2011 (grant of supporters by the Canadian Heraldic Authority) Crest A panther rampant Azure incensed proper Escutcheon Azure an orle Argent Supporters Two panthers incensed holding a girdle book and standing on a rocky mount proper Motto Ardente

== Publications ==
- L'héritage Symbolique des Hérauts d'Armes: Dictionnaire Encyclopédique de l'Enseignement du Blason Ancien (XIVe-XVIe siècle) (Le Léopard d'or, Paris, 2006). ISBN 2-86377-204-X

== See also ==
- Royal Heraldry Society of Canada

Heraldic offices
Preceded by Robert Watt	Chief Herald of Canada; 2007–2020	Succeeded by Samy Khalid
Preceded by position created	Deputy Chief Herald of Canada; 2005–2007	Succeeded by Bruce Patterson
Preceded by Auguste Vachon	Saint-Laurent Herald; 2000–2007	Succeeded by Bruce Patterson
Preceded by position created	Saguenay Herald; 1997–2000	Succeeded by Bruce Patterson
Preceded by position created	Margaree-Chéticamp Herald Emeritus; 2020	Succeeded by Vacant
