= Robert Watt (officer of arms) =

Former Canadian museum curator and officer of arms

Robert Watt LVO AIH FRHSC
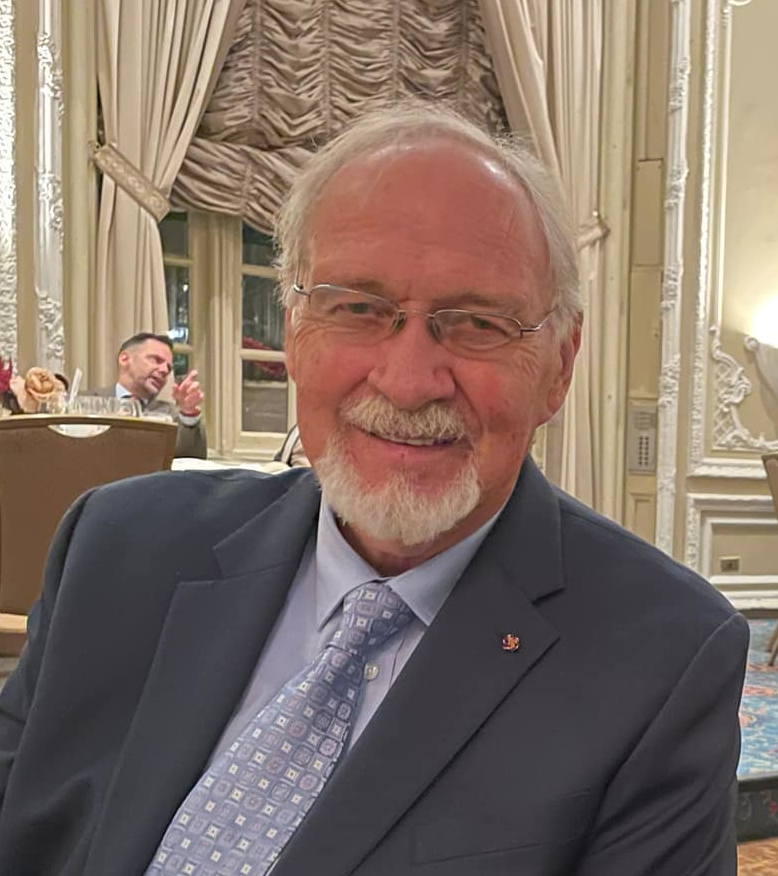
- Watt in 2024 at the 36th International Congress of Genealogical and Heraldic Sciences in Boston.

Chief Herald of Canada
- In office 1988 – June 26, 2007
- Monarch: Elizabeth II
- Governors General: Jeanne Sauvé; Ray Hnatyshyn; Roméo LeBlanc; Adrienne Clarkson; Michaëlle Jean
- Succeeded by: Claire Boudreau

Personal details
- Born: Robert Douglas Watt; 1945 (age 80–81) Picton, Ontario, Canada
- Spouse: Alison Jean Logan (m. 1973)
- Education: Carleton University (BA, MA)
- Occupation: Curator; officer of arms

Robert Douglas Watt (born 1945) is a former Canadian museum curator and officer of arms who served as the first Chief Herald of Canada. He was appointed at the foundation of the Canadian Heraldic Authority in 1988, and he was succeeded by Claire Boudreau in 2007.

== Life and career ==
Watt was born in Picton, Ontario, in 1945. He received a Bachelor of Arts in 1967 and a Master of Arts in 1968 from Carleton University. From 1969 to 1970, he was an archivist for the Public Archives of Canada. From 1971 to 1973, he was the Vancouver City Archivist.

In 1973, he was appointed as Curator of History at the Vancouver Centennial Museum (now the Vancouver Museum). He became Chief Curator in 1977 and was Director from 1980 to 1988. He was appointed as the first Chief Herald of Canada in 1988, and he served in that position until 2007.

He was appointed as a Lieutenant of the Royal Victorian Order (LVO) in the 2008 New Year Honours and received his insignia from the Prince of Wales at Buckingham Palace on May 16, 2008. Watt is also an Officer of the Most Venerable Order of the Hospital of St. John and has been awarded the 125th Anniversary of the Confederation of Canada Medal, the Queen Elizabeth II Golden Jubilee Medal and the Queen Elizabeth Diamond Jubilee Medal. He was made an Honorary Senior Fellow of Renison University College in 1990.

He is currently the Honorary Lieutenant Colonel for 12 (Vancouver) Field Ambulance. Watt served as a citizenship judge in Vancouver from September 2009 to September 2015. He was president of the Académie Internationale d'Héraldique between 2015 and 2022.

In 2019, he wrote People Among the People: The Public Art of Susan Point, a non-fiction book describes the collected work of Susan Point through interviews and archival research.

He is married to Alison Watt (née Logan), the former Director, University Secretariat of Simon Fraser University.

== Coat of arms ==
Coat of arms of Robert Watt
Crest First: A lymphad Azure embellished and with pennons Or its sail Argent charged with a martlet Azure; Second: Out of a circlet of maple leaves Gules and roses Argent barbed and seeded proper, a lamb rampant winged Argent nimbed Or unguled Gules supporting a gonfanon Argent its cross Gules and streamers pendant Gules, Argent and Gules each fringed, the staff furnished and headed by a cross formy Or Escutcheon Quarterly first and fourth Argent an oak tree issuant from a mount in base Vert, on a chief Sable an open book proper binding and fore-edges Or between two garbs all within a bordure per chief Or and Vert; second and third Gules on a chevron Argent between three closed books bound in vellum proper, edged, garnished and clasped Or, two chevronels Vert, on a chief Argent a cougar passant Gules Supporters Two sea-cougars Gules queued and winged Argent each gorged with a coronet erablé Argent jewelled Gules, issuant from barry wavy Argent and Azure, and set before a grassy mount Vert strewn with maple seeds Or Motto First: FIRM FAITH AND BRIGHT HOPE; Second: ROSE AND MAPLE LEAF ENTWINE FOREVER Badge A cougar's head erased affronté Gules gorged with a collar having a chain from the sinister side Or and charged with four maple leaves Gules and as many white roses barbed and seeded proper Symbolism The arms in the first and fourth quarters are those of Mr. Watt’s father, George Cuthill Watt. These Canadian arms are based on a Scottish grant of 1987, to one of his father’s first cousins, David Brand Watt III. They feature an oak tree on a green mount, a symbol long associated in Scottish heraldry with people having the surname Watt. In the chief, the book between the wheat sheaves represents Mr. Watt’s great-grandfather, David Brand Watt I, a schoolmaster, who was the son and grandson of James and John Watt, bakers in Dunfermline, Fife. The border differences these arms from those of David Brand Watt III. The arms in the second and third quarters are those granted to Mr. Watt from the English Kings of Arms in 1983. They blend references to British Columbia and his career. The books symbolize academic pursuits and occupations in various fields of applied history. The chevron and chevronnels represent the mountains, Hollyburn and Grouse, at the bases of which he has lived. They also refer more widely to the landscape of much of British Columbia, where he has lived most of his life. Mr. Watt has always been fascinated by the big cat of the province, the cougar, and shows it here in red, one of Canada’s national colours, appearing on white, the other national colour. In the first crest, from his father, the lymphad and the martlet are borrowed from the arms of West Vancouver, where Mr. Watt and his father grew up. In the second crest, the floral chaplet combines the national floral emblems of Canada, the maple leaf, and England, the rose, to symbolize his marriage with Alison Logan, a native-born Londoner. They were married in the Temple Church in 1973 and the symbols of the two Inns of Court that care for the Church are Pegasus and the Agnus Dei, hence the winged Agnus Dei. FIRM FAITH AND BRIGHT HOPE is a phrase borrowed from a letter sent in 1911 from Mr. Watt’s great-grandfather David Brand Watt I to his fourth son, his grandfather, John Turner Watt, when John was taking up the duties as an elder in the Presbyterian Church in North Vancouver. ROSE AND MAPLE LEAF ENTWINE FOREVER is a celebration of Mr. Watt’s marriage, a reference to the sinister crest, and an adaption from the famous patriotic song by Alexander Muir, “The Maple Leaf Forever”, referring to his love of Canadian history and his maternal descent from French Huguenot Loyalists who left New York in exile on HMS Hope in 1783. These symbolize land, sea and air, the components that Mr. Watt worked with and moved across and through during his term of service as Chief Herald of Canada. The coronet is that same one found in the Arms of Office of the Chief Herald of Canada. The maple seeds in the compartment signify both the growth potential of the Canadian Heraldic Authority of which he was the first Chief Herald, and Mr. Watt’s immediate family: his wife, Alison; his two children, Michael and Catherine; and him.

== See also ==
- Royal Heraldry Society of Canada

== Notes ==
Heraldic offices
New title	Chief Herald of Canada; 1988 – 2007	Succeeded by Claire Boudreau
