= Proclamation of accession of Charles III =

Formalities when Charles III became king in 2022

Charles III became King of the United Kingdom and of 14 other Commonwealth realms upon the death of his mother, Queen Elizabeth II, on 8 September 2022. Royal succession in the realms occurs immediately upon the death of the reigning monarch. The formal proclamation in Britain occurred on 10 September 2022 at 10:00 BST, the same day on which the Accession Council gathered at St James's Palace in London. The other realms, including most Canadian provinces and all Australian states, issued their own proclamations at times relative to their time zones, following meetings of the relevant privy or executive councils. While the line of succession is identical in all the Commonwealth realms, the royal title as proclaimed is not the same in all of them.

== United Kingdom ==
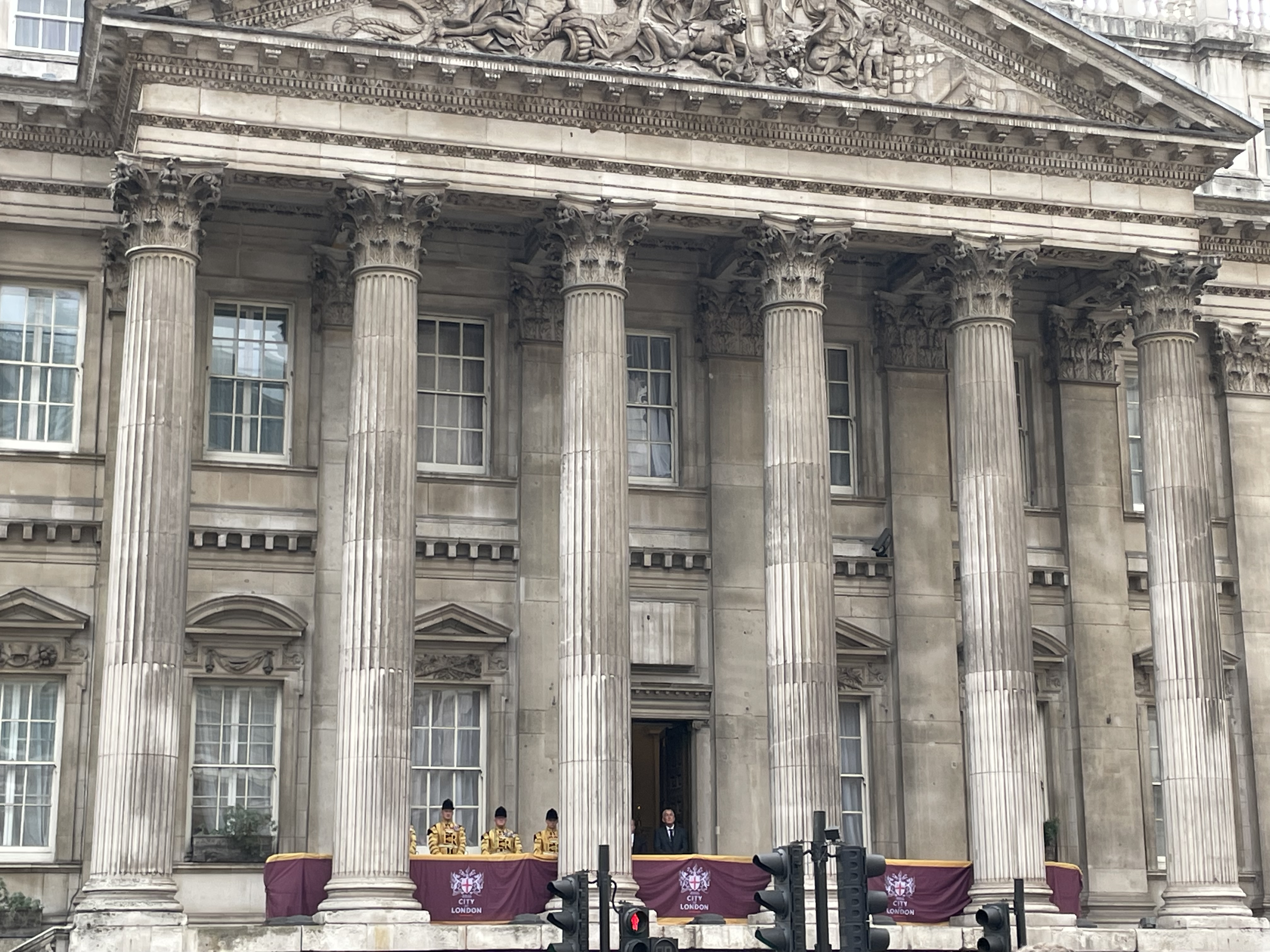
Proclamation of accession on the steps of the Royal Exchange in the City of London

The proclamation occurred on 10 September 2022 at 10:00 am BST at St James's Palace in London. Although all 700 members of the Privy Council were eligible to attend the Accession Council, only 200 were summoned due to limitations of space.

Out of the King's presence, the Lord President of the Council had the clerk of the Council read the Accession Proclamation. In addition to announcing the accession and pledging loyalty, it formally introduced the King's new regnal name, Charles III. The proclamation was signed by Queen Camilla, the new queen consort; Prince William, the new Prince of Wales; Justin Welby, the archbishop of Canterbury; Brandon Lewis, the lord chancellor; Stephen Cottrell, the archbishop of York; the Duke of Norfolk, the earl marshal; Penny Mordaunt, the lord president; and Liz Truss, the prime minister. The lord president then read the orders of council on issues dealing with the public proclamations and gun salutes at Hyde Park and the Tower of London.

The Privy Council was then summoned to attend the King for the second part of the council, where he delivered a personal address regarding the Queen's death. He took an oath to preserve the independence of the Church of Scotland, which was reaffirmed by signing two documents as Queen Camilla and the Prince of Wales witnessed his signature. At the conclusion of the ceremony, privy counsellors signed the proclamation. A minor incident during the signing, in which the King showed visible frustration at there being too many items on his under-sized table, went viral online.

Charles III's Accession Council was the first to be televised and the first to be streamed online. At 11:00 am, 21-gun salutes at the Tower of London, Cardiff Castle, Edinburgh Castle, Castle Cornet in Guernsey, Gibraltar, and naval bases and stations at sea marked the accession of Charles III. After the proclamation ceremony, the King greeted crowds outside Buckingham Palace.

When the Parliament of the United Kingdom met, members swore allegiance to the new king and expressed condolences for the late Queen's death. Most parliamentary activities were suspended for 10 days. At 3:30 pm, the King hosted the prime minister and the cabinet for an audience. On the same day, the proclamation of the accession was issued by the devolved governments of Scotland, Wales, and Northern Ireland.

=== Text of proclamation ===
The following text, published as a supplement to The London Gazette of 12 September, was read by the clerk of the Accession Council, Richard Tilbrook:

Whereas it has pleased Almighty God to call to His Mercy our late Sovereign Lady Queen Elizabeth the Second of Blessed and Glorious memory, by whose Decease the Crown of the United Kingdom of Great Britain and Northern Ireland is solely and rightfully come to The Prince Charles Philip Arthur George:

We, therefore, the Lords Spiritual and Temporal of this Realm and Members of the House of Commons, together with other members of Her late Majesty's Privy Council and representatives of the Realms and Territories, Aldermen, and Citizens of London, and others, do now hereby with one voice and Consent of Tongue and Heart publish and proclaim that The Prince Charles Philip Arthur George is now, by the Death of our late Sovereign of Happy Memory, become our only lawful and rightful Liege Lord Charles the Third, by the Grace of God of the United Kingdom of Great Britain and Northern Ireland and of his other Realms and Territories, King, Head of the Commonwealth, Defender of the Faith, to whom we do acknowledge all Faith and Obedience with humble Affection; beseeching God by whom Kings and Queens do reign to bless His Majesty with long and happy Years to reign over us.

Given at St James's Palace this tenth day of September in the year of Our Lord two thousand and twenty-two.

GOD SAVE THE KING

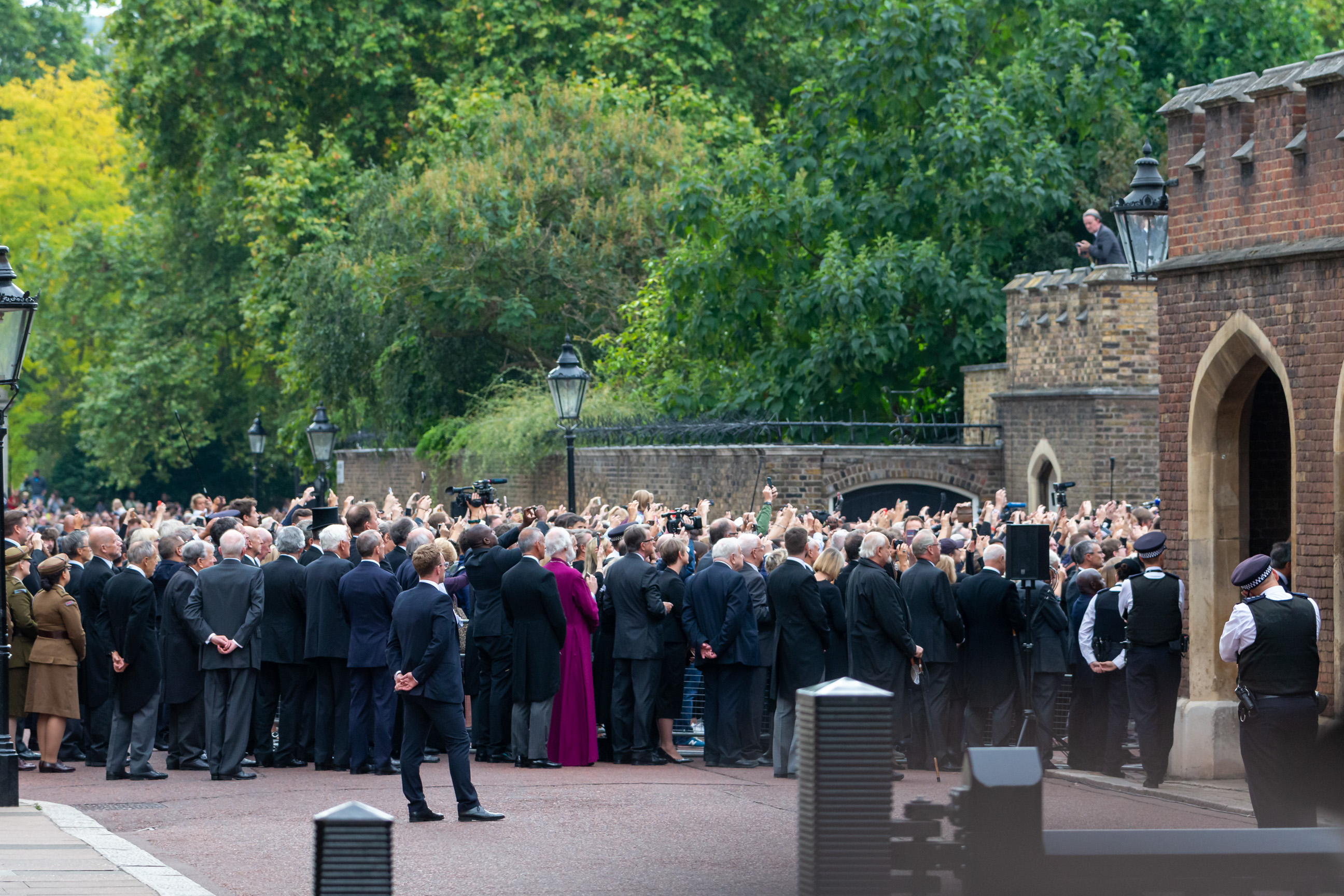
Members of the public and members of the Accession Council watching the proclamation of the new king on the balcony in Friary Court at St James's Palace in London.

Video of one of the many local proclamation ceremonies

The proclamation was read by the Garter King of Arms, David White, at 11:00 am from the Proclamation Gallery of Friary Court in St James's Palace, then by the Clarenceux King of Arms, Timothy Duke, at the Royal Exchange in the City of London. Flags flew at full-mast at 11:00 am on Saturday as the proclamation was being read, before being returned to half-mast until the day of the Queen's funeral. Several services were held across the UK on the same day and the day after, during which the proclamation was read by local officials.

As in past proclamations, before the traditional three cheers, the ceremony in the areas around the Tower of London had the following response by personnel of the Yeomen Warders after the proclamation was read by the Resident Governor of the Tower of London and Keeper of the Jewel House, in a preview of the cheers to the Sovereign shouted from this point on in the traditional Ceremony of the Keys in the Tower:

Chief Warder: "God preserve King Charles III!"
Warders: "Amen!"

=== Wales ===
The proclamation in Wales was held at Cardiff Castle on 10 September, with more than 2,000 people attending the ceremony. Guests included Members of the Senedd, Secretary of State for Wales Robert Buckland, and other officials. The ceremony was officiated by First Minister Mark Drakeford, who first had the Wales Herald, Thomas Lloyd, read the proclamation in English, and then had the Lord Lieutenant of South Glamorgan, Morfudd Meredith, read it in Welsh.

The proclamation in Welsh reads:

FFURF AR BROCLAMASIWN AR GYFER DATGAN Y SOFRAN NEWYDD YN Y DEYRNAS UNEDIG

Gan ei bod wedi rhyngu bodd i Dduw Hollalluog i alw i’w Ofal ein diweddar Sofran, yr Arglwyddes Frenhines Elizabeth yr Ail, o Fendigaid a Gogoneddus Goffadwriaeth, y mae Coron Teyrnas Unedig Prydain Fawr a Gogledd Iwerddon, oblegid ei Hymadawiad, wedi dod yn gwbl ac yn gyfiawn i ran y Tywysog Charles Philip Arthur George: Yr ydym ninnau, felly, Arglwyddi Ysbrydol a Thymhorol y Deyrnas hon ac Aelodau o Dŷ’r Cyffredin, ynghyd ag aelodau eraill o Gyfrin Gyngor Ei diweddar Fawrhydi, cynrychiolwyr y Teyrnasoedd a’r Tiriogaethau, Henaduriaid a Dinasyddion Llundain, ac eraill, yn awr yn datgan ac yn cyhoeddi drwy hyn yn unllais ac o Galon a Thafod unfryd fod y Tywysog Charles Philip Arthur George, bellach, oblegid Marwolaeth ein diweddar Sofran o Serchus Goffadwriaeth, wedi dod inni yn unig gyfreithlon a chyfiawn Ddyledog Arglwydd Charles y Trydydd, drwy Ras Duw, ar Deyrnas Unedig Prydain Fawr a Gogledd Iwerddon a’i Deyrnasoedd eraill, yn Frenin, yn Ben ar y Gymanwlad, yn Amddiffynnwr y Ffydd, i’r hwn yr ydym yn datgan, ag Anwylserch gostyngedig, ein holl Ffydd a’n Hufudd-dod; gan atolwg ar i Dduw, drwy’r hwn y mae Brenhinoedd a Breninesau yn teyrnasu, fendithio Ei Fawrhydi â hir Oes hapus i deyrnasu drosom.

Rhoddwyd ym Mhalas St. James y degfed dydd o fis Medi ym mlwyddyn Ein Harglwydd dwy fil a dwy ar hugain.

DUW A GADWO’R BRENIN

=== Northern Ireland ===
The proclamation in Northern Ireland was held at the Hillsborough Castle in Royal Hillsborough on 11 September at 12:00 noon. It was read out by Robert Noel, Norroy and Ulster King of Arms. Attendees included Secretary of State for Northern Ireland Chris Heaton-Harris, Minister of State for Northern Ireland Steve Baker, Democratic Unionist Party leader Jeffrey Donaldson, and Alliance party leader Naomi Long. While Sinn Féin stayed away and attended a rally in Belfast for victims of The Troubles instead, the party said it would attend other official events during the period of mourning.

=== Scotland ===
The proclamation in Scotland was held at Mercat Cross, Edinburgh, on 11 September. The ceremony was attended by Scottish judges and politicians, including First Minister Nicola Sturgeon. It was read by Joseph Morrow, Lord Lyon King of Arms. A few attendees protested against the monarchy and booed as Morrow spoke.

On 12 September, the proclamation was read at Comhairle nan Eilean Siar in Stornoway, in both English and Scottish Gaelic.

The proclamation in Scottish Gaelic reads:

MODH GLAODH AIRSON A BHITH A' GLAODH AN UACHDARAIN ÙIR SAN RÌOGHACHD AONAICHTE

O chionn's gun robh e mar thoil an Dia Uile-chumhachdaich gairm gu A Thròcair an Dàrna Banrigh Ealasaid nach maireann, le Cuimhneachan Glòrmhor agus Beannaichte, le a bàs tha Crùn Rìoghachd Aonaichte na Breatainne Mòire agus Èirinn a Tuath a' teannadh a-mhàin agus gu ceart air a' Phrionnsa Teàrlach Filip Artair Seòras: Tha sinne, le sin, na Morairean Spioradail agus Aimsireil den Rìoghachd seo agus Buill de Thaigh nan Cumantan, còmhla ri buill eile de Chomhairle Dhìomhair na Banrigh nach maireann agus riochdairean de na Rìoghachdan agus Dùthchannan, Comhairlichean agus Luchd-còmhnaidh Lunnainn agus eile, a-nis le aon ghuth agus Cead Teanga agus Cridhe a' foillseachadh agus a' gairm gu bheil am Prionnsa Teàrlach Filip Artair Seòras a-nise, le Bàs na Banrigh de Chuimhneachain Thoilichte nach maireann, mar an aon Phrìomh Mhorair an Tritheamh Teàrlach, le Gràs Dhè de Rìoghachd Aonaichte na Breatainne Mòire agus Èirinn a Tuath agus de na Rìoghachdan agus Dùthchannan eile, Rìgh, Ceannard a' Cho-fhlaitheis, Neach-dìon a' Chreideimh, thuige gu bheil sinn ag aithneachadh Creideamh air fad agus Ùmhlachd le Dìlseachd iriosal; a' guidhe air Dia fo bheil Rìghrean agus Bhanrighrean a' riaghladh, A Mhòrachd a bheannachadh le bliadhnaichean fada agus sona a' riaghladh thairis oirnn.

Air a ghairm aig Lùchairt an Naomh Sheumais air an deicheamh latha den t-Sultain sa bhliadhna dà mhìle is dhà air fhichead.

A DHIA GLÈIDH AN RÌGH

== British Overseas Territories ==
The Form of Proclamation for British Overseas Territories was set out in an Order in Council approved at the Accession Council.

Whereas it has pleased Almighty God to call to His Mercy our late Sovereign Lady Queen Elizabeth the Second of Blessed and Glorious Memory, by whose Decease the Crown is solely and rightfully come to The Prince Charles Philip Arthur George: We,

INSERT THE DESCRIPTION OF THE PERSONS MAKING THE PROCLAMATION

do now hereby with one voice and Consent of Tongue and Heart publish and proclaim that The Prince Charles Philip Arthur George is now, by the Death of our late Sovereign of Happy Memory, become our only lawful and rightful Liege Lord Charles the Third, by the Grace of God of the United Kingdom of Great Britain and Northern Ireland and of His other Realms and Territories, King, Head of the Commonwealth, Defender of the Faith, to whom we do acknowledge all Faith and Obedience with humble Affection; beseeching God by whom Kings and Queens do reign to bless His Majesty with long and happy Years to reign over us.

Given at [Location] this [ ] day of September in the year of Our Lord 2022.

GOD SAVE THE KING

=== Anguilla ===
The proclamation in Anguilla was held at the Government House in Old Ta at 11:00 am on 11 September and was read by Governor Dileeni Daniel-Selvaratnam.

=== Bermuda ===
The proclamation in Bermuda took place in Front Street, Hamilton, on 11 September and was read by Governor of Bermuda, Rena Lalgie, in the presence of legislators and a crowd of Bermudians. The ceremony was accompanied by a march-past by the Royal Bermuda Regiment and a 21-gun salute over Hamilton Harbour to mark the closing of the proclamation shortly after 9 am local time.

Whereas it has pleased Almighty God to call to His Mercy our late Sovereign Lady Queen Elizabeth the Second of Blessed and Glorious Memory, by whose Decease the Crown is solely and rightfully come to The Prince Charles Philip Arthur George:

I, Rena Lalgie, Governor and Commander-in-Chief of Bermuda, do now hereby with one voice and consent of tongue and heart, publish and proclaim that Prince Charles Philip Arthur George, is now by the death of our Late Sovereign of happy memory become our only lawful and rightful liege Lord Charles III, by the Grace of God, of the United Kingdom, Great Britain and Northern Ireland, and of his other realms and territories, King, Head of the Commonwealth, defender of the faith, to whom we do acknowledge all faith and obedience with humble affection, beseeching God, by whom kings and queens do reign, to bless His Majesty with long and happy years to reign over us.

Given at the City of Hamilton Bermuda this 11th day of September in the year of our Lord 2022.

=== British Antarctic Territory ===
The proclamation in the British Antarctic Territory, the largest and most southerly of the British overseas territories, was read by Commissioner Paul Candler via a video link from London on 12 September to Rothera Research Station on the Antarctic Peninsula.

WHEREAS it has pleased Almighty God to call to His Mercy our late Sovereign Lady Queen Elizabeth the Second of Blessed and Glorious Memory, by whose Decease the Crown is solely and rightfully come to The Prince Charles Philip Arthur George: I,
Paul Candler, His Majesty’s Commissioner for The British Antarctic Territory

do now hereby with one voice and Consent of Tongue and Heart publish and proclaim that The Prince Charles Philip Arthur George is now, by the Death of our late Sovereign of Happy Memory, become our only lawful and rightful Liege Lord Charles the Third, by the Grace of God of the United Kingdom of Great Britain and Northern Ireland and all of His other Realms and Territories, King, Head of the Commonwealth, Defender of the Faith, to whom we do acknowledge all Faith and Obedience with humble Affection; beseeching God by whom Kings and Queens do reign to bless His Majesty with long and happy Years to reign over us.

GIVEN under my hand in London this 12th day of September in the year of Our Lord 2022.

GOD SAVE THE KING

=== British Indian Ocean Territory ===
The proclamation in the British Indian Ocean Territory took place at the British Forces Headquarters in Diego Garcia on 11 September, and was read by Major Matt Adams of the Royal Marines on behalf of Commissioner Paul Candler.

Whereas it has pleased Almighty God to call to His Mercy our late Sovereign Lady Queen Elizabeth the Second of Blessed and Glorious Memory, by whose Decease the Crown is solely and rightfully come to The Prince Charles Philip Arthur George: I, Major Matt Adams Royal Marines on behalf of His Majesty’s Commissioner for The British Indian Ocean Territory, Paul Candler, do now hereby with one voice and Consent of Tongue and Heart publish and proclaim that The Prince Charles Philip Arthur George is now, by the Death of our late Sovereign of Happy Memory, become our only lawful and rightful Liege Lord Charles the Third, by the Grace of God of the United Kingdom of Great Britain and Northern Ireland and all of His other Realms and Territories, King, Head of the Commonwealth, Defender of the Faith, to whom we do acknowledge all Faith and Obedience with humble Affection; beseeching God by whom Kings and Queens do reign to bless His Majesty with long and happy Years to reign over us.

Given at British Forces Headquarters, British Indian Ocean Territory, Diego Garcia this 11th day of September in the year of Our Lord 2022.

=== British Virgin Islands ===
The proclamation in the British Virgin Islands took place at the Government House in Road Town on 11 September and was read by Governor John Rankin, in the presence of Premier Natalio Wheatley, Deputy Governor David Archer Jr., and members of the House of the Assembly. After the proclamation, those in attendance said God Save the King, followed by a gun salute.

WHEREAS it has pleased Almighty God to call to His Mercy our late Sovereign Lady Queen Elizabeth the Second of Blessed and Glorious Memory, by whose Decease the Crown is solely and rightfully come to The Prince Charles Philip Arthur George:

I, JOHN JAMES RANKIN CMG, Governor of the Virgin Islands do now hereby with one voice and Consent of Tongue and Heart publish and proclaim that The Prince Charles Philip Arthur George is now, by the Death of our late Sovereign of Happy Memory, become our only lawful and rightful Liege Lord Charles the Third, by the Grace of God of the United Kingdom of Great Britain and Northern Ireland and of His other Realms and Territories, King, Head of the Commonwealth, Defender of the Faith, to whom we do acknowledge all Faith and Obedience with humble Affection; beseeching God by whom Kings and Queens do reign to bless His Majesty with long and happy Years to reign over us.

GIVEN at Government House, Road Town, Tortola, this 11th day of September in the year of our Lord 2022.

GOD SAVE THE KING!

=== Cayman Islands ===
The proclamation in the Cayman Islands took place at Government House in Grand Cayman, on 11 September at 9:00 am (local time) and was read by Governor Martyn Roper. It was accompanied by a 21-gun salute and a march past by contingents of the Royal Cayman Islands Police Service, Cayman Islands Regiment, Cayman Islands Coast Guard, Cayman Islands Fire Service, Cayman Islands Prison Service, Cayman Islands Cadet Corps, and its marching band.

WHEREAS it has pleased Almighty God to call to His Mercy our late Sovereign Lady Queen Elizabeth the Second of Blessed and Glorious Memory, by whose Decease the Crown has solely and rightfully come to The Prince Charles Philip Arthur George:

NOW, THEREFORE, I, Martyn Keith Roper, Governor of the Cayman Islands, do now hereby with one voice and Consent of Tongue and Heart publish and proclaim that Prince Charles Philip Arthur George, is now by the death of our Late Sovereign of Happy Memory, become our only lawful and rightful liege Lord Charles the Third, by the Grace of God of the United Kingdom of Great Britain and Northern Ireland, and of His other Realms and Territories, King, Head of the Commonwealth, Defender of the Faith, to whom we do acknowledge all faith and obedience with humble affection, beseeching God by whom Kings and Queens do reign to bless His Majesty with long and happy years to reign over us.

GIVEN AT GOVERNMENT HOUSE IN THE ISLAND OF GRAND CAYMAN, THIS 11th DAY OF SEPTEMBER IN THE YEAR OF OUR LORD TWO THOUSAND AND TWENTY-TWO.

GOD SAVE THE KING.

=== Falkland Islands ===
The proclamation in the Falkland Islands was held at Government House in Stanley on the morning of 11 September and was read by Governor Alison Blake. The ceremony was attended by government officials, members of the Legislative Assembly, and representatives of British Forces South Atlantic Islands.

WHEREAS it has pleased Almighty God to call to His Mercy our late Sovereign Lady Queen Elizabeth the Second of Blessed and Glorious Memory, by whose Decease the Crown is solely and rightfully come to The Prince Charles Philip Arthur George:

I, Alison Mary Blake CMG, Governor of the Falkland Islands do now hereby with one voice and Consent of Tongue and Heart publish and proclaim that The Prince Charles Philip Arthur George is now, by the Death of our late Sovereign of Happy Memory, become our only lawful and rightful Liege Lord Charles the Third, by the Grace of God of the United Kingdom of Great Britain and Northern Ireland and of His other Realms and Territories, King, Head of the Commonwealth, Defender of the Faith, to whom we do acknowledge all Faith and Obedience with humble Affection; beseeching God by whom Kings and Queens do reign to bless His Majesty with long and happy Years to reign over us.

Given at Government House, in the City of Stanley, Falkland Islands this eleventh day of September in the year of Our Lord two thousand and twenty two.

GOD SAVE THE KING.

=== Gibraltar ===
The proclamation in Gibraltar took place at The Convent at 12:00 noon on 11 September. It was read by Governor David Steel, who was joined by the political, civic, and religious leaders of the territory. A 21-gun salute was fired after the ceremony by the Royal Gibraltar Regiment from Devil's Gap Battery.

Whereas it has pleased Almighty God to call to His Mercy our late Sovereign Lady Queen Elizabeth the Second of Blessed and Glorious Memory, by whose Decease the Crown is solely and rightfully come to The Prince Charles Philip Arthur George:

I, David George Steel, Governor and Commander-in-Chief of Gibraltar do now hereby with one voice and Consent of Tongue and Heart publish and proclaim that The Prince Charles Phillip Arthur George is now, by the Death of our late Sovereign of Happy Memory, become our only lawful and rightful Liege Lord Charles the Third, by the Grace of God of the United Kingdom of Great Britain and Northern Ireland and of His other Realms and Territories, King, Head of the Commonwealth, Defender of the Faith, to whom we do acknowledge all Faith and Obedience and humble Affection; beseeching God, by whom Kings and Queens do reign to bless His Majesty with long and happy Years to reign over us.

Given at Gibraltar this 11th Day of September in the year of our Lord 2022.

God Save The King.

=== Montserrat ===
The proclamation in Montserrat took place at Salem Park at 7:55 am (local time) on 11 September and was read by Governor Sarah Tucker. It was followed by a rendition of God Save the King, a 21-gun salute, and three cheers for King Charles III.

=== Pitcairn Islands ===
The proclamation in Pitcairn Islands, one of the smallest British overseas territories, took place at the town hall in Adamstown on 11 September. It was read by Governor Iona Thomas via a video link from Wellington, New Zealand.

=== Saint Helena, Ascension and Tristan da Cunha ===
The proclamation in Saint Helena, Ascension and Tristan da Cunha took place at the Saint Helena Supreme Court in Jamestown at 10:30 am on 11 September. It was read by Governor Nigel Phillips.

Whereas it has pleased Almighty God to call to His Mercy our late Sovereign Lady Queen Elizabeth the Second of Blessed and Glorious Memory, by whose Decease the Crown is solely and rightfully come to The Prince Charles Philip Arthur George;

We, Nigel James Phillips and the citizens of St Helena, Ascension and Tristan da Cunha do now hereby with one voice and Consent of Tongue and Heart publish and proclaim that The Prince Charles Philip Arthur George is now, by the Death of our late Sovereign of Happy Memory, become our only lawful and rightful and Liege Lord Charles the Third, by the Grace of God of the United Kingdom of Great Britain and Northern Ireland and of His other Realms and Territories, King, Head of the Commonwealth, Defender of the Faith, to whom we do acknowledge all Faith and Obedience with humble Affection; beseeching God by whom Kings and Queens do reign to bless His Majesty with long and happy years to reign over us.

Given under my hand at Jamestown, St Helena, this 11th day of September 2022.

GOD SAVE THE KING

=== South Georgia and the South Sandwich Islands ===
The proclamation in South Georgia and the South Sandwich Islands was read by Commissioner Alison Blake via a video link from Government House in Stanley, Falkland Islands, on 11 September to overwintering teams at King Edward Point and Bird Island.

Whereas it has pleased Almighty God to call to His mercy our late Sovereign Lady Queen Elizabeth the Second of Blessed and Glorious memory, by whose Decease the Crown is solely and rightfully come to The Prince Charles Philip Arthur George: I, Alison Mary Blake CMG, Commissioner of South Georgia and the South Sandwich Islands, do now hereby with one voice and Consent of Tongue and Heart publish and proclaim that The Prince Charles Philip Arthur George is now, by the death of our late Sovereign of Happy Memory, become our only lawful and right Liege Lord Charles the Third, by the Grace of God of the United Kingdom of Great Britain and Northern Ireland and of all His other Realms and Territories, King, Head of the Commonwealth, Defender of the Faith, to whom we do acknowledge all Faith and Obedience with humble Affection; beseeching God by whom Kings and Queens do reign to bless His Majesty with long and happy Years to reign over us.

Given at Government House, in the City of Stanley, Falkland Islands this eleventh day of September in the year of Our Lord two thousand and twenty two.

GOD SAVE THE KING

=== Sovereign Base Areas of Akrotiri and Dhekelia ===
The proclamation in the Sovereign Base Areas of Akrotiri and Dhekelia took place at Episkopi Cantonment on 11 September and was read by the Administrator Peter J. M. Squires.

Whereas it has pleased Almighty God to call His Mercy our late Sovereign Lady Queen Elizabeth the Second of Blessed and Glorious Memory, by whose Decease the Crown is solely and rightfully come to The Prince Charles Philip Arthur George. We, therefore, the Administration of the Sovereign Base Areas of Akrotiri and Dhekelia, together with British Forces Cyprus, and others, do now hereby with one voice and Consent of Tongue and Heart publish and proclaim that The Prince Charles Philip Arthur George is now, by the Death or our late Sovereign of Happy Memory, become our only lawful and rightful Liege Lord Charles the Third, by the Grace of God of the United Kingdom of Great Britain and Northern Ireland and of His other Realms and Territories, King, Head of the Commonwealth, Defender of the Faith, to whom we do acknowledge all Faith and Obedience with humble Affection; beseeching God by whom Kings and Queens do reign to bless His Majesty with long and happy Years to reign over us.
Given at Episkopi this the eleventh day of September in the year of Our Lord two thousand and twenty-two.
GOD SAVE THE KING

=== Turks and Caicos Islands ===
The proclamation in the Turks and Caicos Islands was held at Waterloo in Grand Turk Island on 11 September at 11:00 am and was read by Governor Nigel Dakin.

WHEREAS it has pleased Almighty God to call His Mercy our late Sovereign Lady Queen Elizabeth the Second of Blessed and Glorious Memory, by whose Decease the Crown is solely and rightfully come to The Prince Charles Philip Arthur George: I,
NIGEL JOHN DAKIN, GOVERNOR OF
THE TURKS AND CAICOS ISLANDS

do now hereby with one voice and Consent of Tongue and Heart publish and proclaim that The Prince Charles Philip Arthur George is now, by the Death or our late Sovereign of Happy Memory, become our only lawful and rightful Liege Lord Charles the Third, by the Grace of God of the United Kingdom of Great Britain and Northern Ireland and of His other Realms and Territories, King, Head of the Commonwealth, Defender of the Faith, to whom we do acknowledge all Faith and Obedience with humble Affection; beseeching God by whom Kings and Queens do reign to bless His Majesty with long and happy Years to reign over us.

GIVEN under my hand at Waterloo, Grand Turk, Turks and Caicos Islands this 11th day of September 2022.

GOD SAVE THE KING

== Crown Dependencies ==
=== Bailiwick of Guernsey ===
The proclamation in the Bailiwick of Guernsey was held in Guernsey, Alderney, and Sark at 12:00 noon BST on 11 September.

In Guernsey, a special sitting of the States of Guernsey was held at 11 am when the Bailiff of Guernsey, Richard McMahon, read the proclamation. The ceremony was attended by Lieutenant Governor Richard Cripwell, members of the clergy, and government officials. A procession from St James to the Crown Pier by the Corps of Drums of Elizabeth College then took place. After a fanfare trumpet, the Sheriff of Guernsey, Jason Savident, publicly read the proclamation. This was followed by the attendees shouting "Dieu Sauve Le Roi" and a 21-gun salute from Castle Cornet. Cripwell then led the three cheers for Charles III.

In Alderney, the proclamation was read by William Tate, the president of the States of Alderney, at the Court House. This was followed by a public proclamation at the Island Hall. In Sark, a sitting of the Chief Pleas was held before the proclamation was read by Kevin Adams, the Prévôt of Sark, outside St Peter's Church.

Whereas it has pleased Almighty God to call to His Mercy our late Sovereign Lady Queen Elizabeth the Second of Blessed and Glorious Memory, by whose Decease the Crown of the United Kingdom of Great Britain and Northern Ireland is solely and rightfully come to The Prince Charles Philip Arthur George; We, therefore, the Lieutenant-Governor, Bailiff, Deputy Bailiff, King's Officers, Jurats, Members of the States of Deliberation, Clergy, and others, do now hereby with one voice and Consent of Tongue and Heart publish and proclaim that The Prince Charles Philip Arthur George is now, by the Death of our late Sovereign of Happy Memory, become our only lawful and rightful Liege Lord Charles the Third, by the Grace of God of the United Kingdom of Great Britain and Northern Ireland and of His other Realms and Territories, King, Head of the Commonwealth, Defender of the Faith, to whom we do acknowledge all Faith and Obedience with humble Affection; beseeching God by whom Kings and Queens do reign to bless His Majesty with long and happy Years to reign over us.

GOD SAVE THE KING

=== Isle of Man ===
On 11 September, Lieutenant Governor John Lorimer proclaimed Charles III as the Lord of Mann during a ceremony at Government House in Onchan at 12:00 noon. A second ceremony took place on 16 September on Tynwald Hill in St John's, where the accession of Charles III was also proclaimed in the Manx language by Lorimer. Both ceremonies were attended by Chief Minister Alfred Cannan and the President of Tynwald, Laurence Skelly.

The proclamation in English reads:

WHEREAS it hath pleased Almighty God to call to His mercy our late Sovereign Lady Queen Elizabeth II, of blessed and glorious memory, by whose decease the Crown of the United Kingdom of Great Britain and Northern Ireland is solely and rightfully come to the Prince Charles Philip Arthur George: We, therefore, the Lieutenant Governor of the Isle of Man, the president of Tynwald, and the chief minister of the Isle of Man Government, do now hereby with one voice and consent of tongue and heart publish and proclaim that the Prince Charles Philip Arthur George is now, by the death of our late Sovereign, of happy memory, become our only lawful and rightful liege Lord Charles III, by the grace of God of the United Kingdom of Great Britain and Northern Ireland and of his other realms and territories King, Lord of Mann, Head of the Commonwealth, Defender of the Faith, to whom we do acknowledge all faith and obedience with humble affection beseeching God, by whom Kings and Queens do reign to bless His Majesty with long and happy years to reign over us. Given at Government House, Onchan, the Isle of Man, this eleventh day of September in the year of our Lord two thousand and twenty two GOD SAVE THE KING, LORD OF MANN!

=== Jersey ===
The proclamation in Jersey was held at the Royal Square on 11 September. The States Assembly first received the proclamation at 12:00 noon, after which the Bailiff of Jersey, Timothy Le Cocq, mourned the death of Queen Elizabeth II and approved 19 September, the day of her funeral, as a bank holiday. Le Cocq then delivered a speech in the Royal Square at 12:30 pm before reading the proclamation. The ceremony was attended by Members of the States Assembly, officials of the Royal Court, and other government departments, as well as veterans. A 21-gun salute took place at Glacis Field following the ceremony.

Whereas it has pleased Almighty God to call to His Mercy our late Sovereign Lady Queen Elizabeth the Second of Blessed and Glorious Memory, by whose Decease the Crown of the United Kingdom of Great Britain and Northern Ireland is solely and rightfully come to The Prince Charles Philip Arthur George: We, the Bailiff, Deputy Bailiff, Officers of the Crown, Dean of Jersey, Jurats, Members of the States Assembly and the people of Jersey gathered here today in accordance with the Law of Jersey, therefore do now hereby publish and proclaim that The Prince Charles Philip Arthur George is now, by the Death of our late Sovereign of Happy Memory, has become our only lawful and rightful Liege Lord Charles the Third, by the Grace of God of the United Kingdom of Great Britain and Northern Ireland and of His other Realms and Territories, King, Head of the Commonwealth, Defender of the Faith, to whom we do acknowledge all Faith and Obedience with humble Affection; beseeching God by whom Kings and Queens do reign to bless His Majesty, our Duke, with long and happy years to reign over us.

GOD SAVE THE KING.

== Canada ==
The proclamation of Charles as King of Canada took place at Rideau Hall in Ottawa on 10 September, following a formal meeting of the King's Privy Council for Canada. Governor General Mary Simon and Prime Minister Justin Trudeau then signed the proclamation. It was followed by a ceremony that included herald trumpets, a 21-gun salute by the Royal Canadian Artillery, and a moment of remembrance for Queen Elizabeth II. The artillery was accidentally fired before the French version of the proclamation had been read.

=== Text of proclamation ===
The proclamation was read by Samy Khalid, the Chief Herald of Canada, in English:

TO ALL TO WHOM these presents shall come or whom the same may in any way concern,

GREETING:

Whereas our late Sovereign, Queen Elizabeth the Second, passed away on September 8, 2022, by whose death the Crown of Canada vests in His Royal Highness Prince Charles Philip Arthur George;

We, the Right Honourable Mary May Simon, Governor General of Canada, assisted by His Majesty’s Privy Council for Canada, proclaim that His Royal Highness Prince Charles Philip Arthur George is now, by the death of our late Sovereign, Charles the Third, by the Grace of God of the United Kingdom, Canada and His other Realms and Territories King, Head of the Commonwealth, Defender of the Faith, to whom we acknowledge faith and allegiance.

Given under my Hand and Seal of Office at Ottawa, this tenth day of September, two thousand and twenty-two.

Long Live the King

Khalid then proceeded immediately to read the proclamation in French:

À TOUS CEUX à qui les présentes parviennent ou qu’elles peuvent de quelque manière concerner,

SALUT :

Attendu que notre regrettée Souveraine, la reine Elizabeth Deux est décédée le 8 septembre 2022 et que, par son décès, la Couronne du Canada est dévolue à Son Altesse Royale le prince Charles Philip Arthur George,

Nous, la très honorable Mary May Simon, gouverneure générale du Canada, d’accord avec le Conseil privé de Sa Majesté pour le Canada, proclamons que Son Altesse Royale le prince Charles Philip Arthur George est maintenant devenu, par le décès de notre regrettée Souveraine, Charles Trois, par la Grâce de Dieu, Roi du Royaume-Uni, du Canada et de ses autres royaumes et territoires, Chef du Commonwealth, Défenseur de la Foi, à qui nous reconnaissons toute foi et allégeance.

Donné sous mon seing et mon sceau officiel, ce dixième jour de septembre de l’an deux mille vingt-deux.
Vive le roi

=== Provincial proclamations ===
In addition to the ceremony in Ottawa, proclamations of accession ceremonies were held by several provincial lieutenant governors. The Lieutenant Governors of New Brunswick, Newfoundland, Nova Scotia, and Saskatchewan issued their proclamations on 10 September at their relevant official residence or office. The Lieutenant Governors of Ontario and Prince Edward Island issued their proclamations on 12 September; the former at the Ontario Legislative Building and the latter at Government House in Charlottetown. The Lieutenant Governor of Manitoba issued the proclamation on 14 September 2022, and the Lieutenant Governor of Alberta issued the proclamation the following day.

No formal proclamation ceremony was held in Quebec. However, on 10 September, Lieutenant Governor Michel Doyon and his wife, Pauline Théberge, issued a press release marking the accession of Charles as king and Camilla as queen consort.

==== New Brunswick ====
The ceremony in New Brunswick began with a traditional blessing by Wolastoqi Elder Imelda Perley, a prayer by the Anglican Bishop of Fredericton, David Edwards, and remarks by Premier Blaine Higgs. Lieutenant Governor Brenda Murphy then read the proclamation, which was followed by singing of God Save the King and a 21-gun salute.

In English:

Whereas our late Sovereign Queen Elizabeth the Second, passed away on September 8, 2022, by whose death the Crown of Canada, vests in His Royal Highness Charles Philip Arthur George.

We the Honourable Brenda L. Murphy, Lieutenant Governor of the Province of New Brunswick, assisted by His Majesty’s Executive Council for the Province of New Brunswick, Proclaim that His Royal Highness Prince Charles Philip Arthur George is now, by the death of our late Sovereign, CHARLES THE THIRD, by the Grace of God, of the United Kingdom, Canada, and His Other Realms and Territories, KING, Head of the Commonwealth, Defender of the Faith, to whom we acknowledge our faith and allegiance.

In Testimony Whereof We have cause these Our Letters to be made Patent and the Great Seal of the Province of New Brunswick to be hereunto affixed.

Witness, Our Trusty and Well Beloved, Brenda L. Murphy, Chancellor of Our Order of New Brunswick, and Lieutenant Governor in and of Our Province of New Brunswick.

Given at our Government House in the City of Fredericton, this 10th day of September in the year of Lord two thousand and twenty-two and in the first year of Our reign.

GOD SAVE THE KING!

In French:

Attendu que Notre regrettée Souveraine, la reine Elizabeth II, est décédée le 8 septembre 2022 et que, par son décès, la Couronne du Canada est dévolue à Son Altesse Royale Charles Philip Arthur George.

Nous, l'honorable Brenda L. Murphy, lieutenantegouverneure du Nouveau-Brunswick, et le Conseil exécutif du Nouveau-Brunswick de Sa Majesté, proclamons que Son Altesse Royale le prince Charles Philip Arthur George est désormais devenu, par la mort de Notre regrettée Souveraine, CHARLES III, par la Grâce de Dieu, ROI du Royaume-Uni, du Canada et de tous les autres royaumes et territoires, Chef du Commonwealth, Défenseur de la Foi, à qui Nous reconnaissons toute foi et obéissance.

En foi de quoi, Nous avons fait délivrer Nos présentes lettres patentes et y avons fait apposer le grand sceau du Nouveau-Brunswick. Témoin : Notre fidèle et bien-aimée Brenda L. Murphy, chancelière de l’Ordre du Nouveau-Brunswick et lieutenantegouverneure du Nouveau-Brunswick.

Donné à la Résidence du gouverneur à Fredericton, le dixième jour de septembre de l’an deux mille vingt-deux et au cours de la première année de Notre règne.

DIEU PROTÈGE LE ROI!

==== Newfoundland and Labrador ====
The proclamation in Newfoundland and Labrador was read by Lieutenant Governor Judy Foote in a ceremony officiated by Premier Andrew Furey. It was followed by a 21-gun salute, a rendition of God Save the King, and a toast to King Charles III.

BY HER HONOUR
THE HONOURABLE JUDY M FOOTE
LIEUTENANT GOVERNOR OF THE
PROVINCE OF NEWFOUNDLAND AND LABRADOR

WHEREAS it hath pleased Almighty God to call to His Mercy our Late Sovereign Lady Queen Elizabeth the Second of blessed and glorious memory, by whose decease the Crown of Canada and all other her late Majesty's realms is solely and rightfully come to the High and Mighty Prince Charles Philip Arthur George.

NOW KNOW YE that Her Excellency the Right Honourable Mary Simon, Governor General of Canada, assisted by His Majesty's Privy Council for Canada has hereby with one voice and consent of tongue and heart published and proclaimed that the High and Mighty Prince Charles Philip Arthur George is now by the death of Our late Sovereign of happy memory become our lawful and rightful Sovereign, Charles the Third by the Grace of God, of the United Kingdom, Canada, His other Realms and Territories, KING, Head of the Commonwealth, Defender of the Faith, Supreme Lord in and Over Canada, to whom we do acknowledge all faith and obedience with humble affection, beseeching God by whom all Kings and Queens do reign to bless the Royal Prince Charles with long and happy years to reign over us.

Given under my Hand and the Great Seal of
Newfoundland and Labrador at Government House
in St John's, this 10th day of September
in the year of our Lord two-thousand
and twenty-two and in the first year
of His Majesty's Reign.

BY HER HONOUR'S COMMAND,
GOD SAVE THE KING!

==== Nova Scotia ====
The proclamation in Nova Scotia was read by Lieutenant Governor Arthur LeBlanc in a ceremony attended by Premier Tim Houston and Justice Minister Brad Johns, as well as other officials, and included a 21-gun salute.

To all [to] whom these presents shall come, or whom the same may in any wise concern,

Greeting!
A Proclamation

Whereas our late Sovereign Queen Elizabeth the Second, passed away on September 8, 2022, by whose death the Crown of Canada, vests in His Royal Highness Charles Philip Arthur George;

We the Honourable Arthur J. LeBlanc, Lieutenant Governor of the Province of Nova Scotia, assisted by His Majesty’s Executive Council for the Province of Nova Scotia, Proclaim that His Royal Highness Prince Charles Philip Arthur George is now, by the death of our late Sovereign, CHARLES THE THIRD, by the Grace of God, of the United Kingdom, Canada, and His Other Realms and Territories, KING, Head of the Commonwealth, Defender of the Faith, to whom we acknowledge our faith and allegiance;

In Testimony Whereof We have caused these Our Letters to be made Patent and the Great Seal of the Province of Nova Scotia to be hereunto affixed;

Witness Our Trusty and Well Beloved, Arthur J. LeBlanc, Chancellor of Our Order of Nova Scotia, one of Our Counsel learned in the law in the Province of Nova Scotia, Lieutenant Governor in and of Our Province of Nova Scotia;

Given at our Government House in the Halifax Regional Municipality, this 10th day of September in the year of Lord two thousand and twenty-two and in the first year of Our reign;

By Command.

GOD SAVE THE KING!

==== Saskatchewan ====
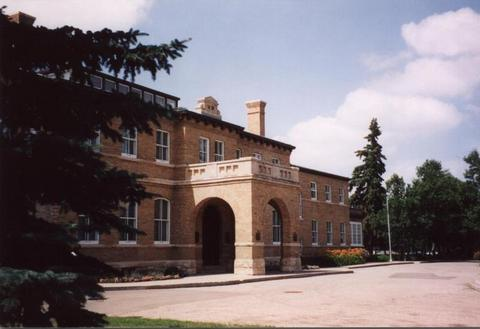
Government House, Regina, where King Charles was proclaimed by the Lieutenant Governor of Saskatchewan

Premier Scott Moe formally advised Lieutenant Governor Russell Mirasty to issue a proclamation, which both then signed, and Mirasty read it aloud to the assembled group.

BY HIS HONOUR, The Honourable Russell B. Mirasty, Lieutenant Governor of Our Province of Saskatchewan.

To all to whom these Presents shall come, GREETING:

A PROCLAMATION

WHEREAS our late Sovereign Queen Elizabeth the Second, passed away on the eighth day of September in the year of Our Lord two thousand and twenty-two, by whose death the Crown of Canada, vests in His Royal Highness Charles Philip Arthur George.

NOW KNOW YE, that by and with the advice of Our Executive Council of Our Province, We do by these Presents proclaim that His Royal Highness Prince Charles Philip Arthur George is now, by the death of our late Sovereign, CHARLES THE THIRD, by the Grace of God, of the United Kingdom, Canada, and His Other Realms and Territories, KING, Head of the Commonwealth, Defender of the Faith, to whom we acknowledge our faith and allegiance.

OF ALL WHICH PRESENTS Our loving Subjects of Our said Province and all others whom they may concern are hereby requested to take notice and govern themselves accordingly.

IN TESTIMONY WHEREOF We have caused Our Great Seal of Our Province of Saskatchewan to be hereunto affixed.

AT OUR CAPITAL CITY OF REGINA, in Our Said Province, this 10th day of September in the year of Our Lord two thousand and twenty-two and in the first year of Our Reign.

==== Ontario ====
A proclamation ceremony was held by the government of Ontario. Premier Doug Ford formally advised Lieutenant Governor Elizabeth Dowdeswell to issue the proclamation. Dowdeswell then signed and read out the proclamation.

In English:

THE HONOURABLE V. ELIZABETH DOWDESWELL, LIEUTENANT GOVERNOR OF THE PROVINCE OF ONTARIO

PROCLAMATION

WHEREAS our dearly beloved late Sovereign, Queen Elizabeth the Second, passed away on September 8, 2022, and by whose death the Crown of Canada vests in his Royal Highness The Prince Charles Philip Arthur George on that date;

THEREFORE I, by and with the advice of His Majesty’s Executive Council of the Province of Ontario, proclaim that:

UPON the death of our late beloved Sovereign, The Prince Charles Philip Arthur George lawfully succeeded to the Crown as CHARLES the THIRD, by the Grace of God of the United Kingdom, Canada and His other Realms and Territories KING, Head of the Commonwealth, Defender of the Faith;

AND THAT The King may be assured of the continuing loyalty and affection of the people of Ontario and their desire that His Majesty enjoy a long and happy reign.

Given under my hand and seal at Toronto, Ontario on September 12, 2022, in the first year of His Majesty's reign.

BY COMMAND
LONG LIVE THE KING!

In French:

L’HONORABLE V. ELIZABETH DOWDESWELL, LIEUTENANTE-GOUVERNEURE DE LA PROVINCE DE L’ONTARIO

PROCLAMATION

ATTENDU QUE notre regrettée Souveraine bien-aimée, la Reine Elizabeth Deux, est décédée le 8 septembre 2022, et que par sa mort la Couronne du Canada est dévolue à Son Altesse Royale, le Prince Charles Philip Arthur George, à cette date;

EN CONSÉQUENCE, je proclame, sur l’avis du Conseil exécutif de la Province de l’Ontario de Sa Majesté, que :

À LA SUITE du décès de notre regrettée Souveraine bien-aimée, le Prince Charles Philip Arthur George a succédé, en toute légitimité, à la Couronne en tant que CHARLES TROIS, par la grâce de Dieu, ROI du Royaume-Uni, du Canada et de ses autres royaumes et territoires, Chef du Commonwealth, Défenseur de la Foi;

ET QUE le Roi peut être assuré que la population de l’Ontario continuera de lui manifester sa loyauté et son affection et qu’elle souhaite à Sa Majesté un long et heureux règne.

Donné sous mon seing et mon sceau à Toronto, en Ontario, le 12 septembre 2022, première année du règne de Sa Majesté.

PAR ORDRE
VIVE LE ROI!

==== Prince Edward Island ====
The ceremony in Prince Edward Island was presided over by Lieutenant Governor Antoinette Perry, who signed and read the proclamation. It was attended by Premier Dennis King and other officials. A 21-gun salute took place after the ceremony.

Whereas our late Sovereign Queen Elizabeth the Second, passed away September 8, 2022, by whose death the Crown of Canada, vests in His Royal Highness Charles Philip Arthur George.

We the Honourable Antoinette Perry, Lieutenant Governor of the Province of Prince Edward Island, assisted by His Majesty's Executive Council for the Province of Prince Edward Island, Proclaim that His Royal Highness Prince Charles Philip Arthur George is now, by the death of our late Sovereign, CHARLES THE THIRD, by the Grace of God, of the United Kingdom, Canada, and His Other Realms and Territories, KING, Head of the Commonwealth, Defender of the Faith, to whom we acknowledge our faith and allegiance.

In Testimony Whereof We have caused these Our Letters to be made Patent and the Great Seal of the Province of Prince Edward Island to be hereunto affixed.

Witness, Our Trusty and Well Beloved, Antoinette Perry, Chancellor of Our Order of Prince Edward Island, Lieutenant Governor in and of Our Province of Prince Edward Island.

Given at our Government House in Charlottetown, this twelfth day of September in the year of Our Lord two thousand and twenty-two and in the first year of Our reign.

By Command,

GOD SAVE THE KING!

==== Manitoba ====
The proclamation in Manitoba was held in Winnipeg. It was signed by Lieutenant Governor Janice Filmon and Minister of Justice and Attorney General Kelvin Goertzen.

In English:

PROCLAMATION

ACCESSION OF KING CHARLES III

With the advice and consent of the Executive Council of Manitoba, We proclaim that, by the death of Our late Sovereign Queen Elizabeth the Second on September 8, 2022, His Royal Highness Prince Charles Philip Arthur George is now Charles the Third, by the Grace of God of the United Kingdom, Canada and His other Realms and Territories KING, Head of the Commonwealth, Defender of the Faith, to whom We acknowledge faith and allegiance.

God save the King!

HER HONOUR JANICE C. FILMON
Lieutenant Governor of the Province of Manitoba
Winnipeg, Manitoba
September 14, 2022
Minister of Justice and Attorney General
KELVIN GOERTZEN

In French:

PROCLAMATION

ACCESSION AU TRÔNE DU ROI CHARLES III

Sur l'avis et avec le consentement du Conseil exécutif du Manitoba, Nous proclamons que par le décès le 8 septembre 2022 de Notre regrettée Souveraine, la reine Elizabeth Deux, Son Altesse Royale le prince Charles Philip Arthur George est maintenant devenu Charles Trois, par la Grâce de Dieu, ROI du Royaume-Uni, du Canada et de Ses autres royaumes et territoires, Chef du Commonwealth, Défenseur de la Foi, à qui Nous reconnaissons toute foi et allégeance.

Vive le roi!

JANICE C. FILMON,
Lieutenante-gouverneure du Manitoba
Winnipeg (Manitoba)
Le 14 septembere 2022
Le ministre de la Justice et procureur général,
KELVIN GOERTZEN

==== Alberta ====
The proclamation in Alberta was read by Lieutenant Governor Salma Lakhani. It was signed by Lakhani, Premier Jason Kenney, and Justice Minister Tyler Shandro. The ceremony ended with a rendition of God Save the King.

PROCLAMATION

To all to Whom these Presents shall come

GREETING

Frank Bosscha, K.C., Deputy Attorney General

WHEREAS our late Sovereign Queen Elizabeth the Second passed away on September 8, 2022, by whose death the Crown of Canada vests in His Royal Highness Charles Philip Arthur George;

NOW KNOW YE THAT by and with the advice and consent of Our Executive Council of Our Province of Alberta, We proclaim that His Royal Highness Prince Charles Philip Arthur George is now, by the death of our late Sovereign, CHARLES THE THIRD, by the Grace of God, of the United Kingdom, Canada and His Other Realms and Territories, KING, Head of the Commonwealth, Defender of the Faith, to whom we acknowledge our faith and allegiance.

IN TESTIMONY WHEREOF We have caused these Our Letters to be made Patent and the Great Seal of Our Province of Alberta to be hereunto affixed.

WITNESS: THE HONOURABLE SALMA LAKHANI, Lieutenant Governor of Our Province of Alberta, this 15th day of September in the Year of Our Lord Two Thousand Twenty-two and in the First Year of Our Reign.

GOD SAVE THE KING!

BY COMMAND
Tyler Shandro, K.C., Provincial Secretary

== Australia ==
The proclamation in Australia took place in front of Parliament House, Canberra, on 11 September and was read by Governor-General David Hurley, after being approved by an Australian Executive Council meeting at Government House. The proclamation was signed by Hurley and countersigned by Prime Minister Anthony Albanese. An Indigenous Australian dance ceremony followed the proclamation, along with a 21-gun salute. Similar proclamations took place on the same day in all the states of Australia, except Victoria, which issued its proclamation on Monday, 12 September, reflecting each state's separate relationship to the crown.

=== Text of proclamation ===
The proclamation was read by Governor-General David Hurley at Parliament House.

WHEREAS because of the death of our blessed and glorious Queen Elizabeth the Second, the Crown has solely and rightfully come to Prince Charles Philip Arthur George:

We, therefore, General the Honourable David Hurley AC DSC (Retd), Governor-General of the Commonwealth of Australia, and members of the Federal Executive Council, do now proclaim Prince Charles Philip Arthur George to be King Charles III, by the Grace of God King of Australia and his other Realms and Territories, Head of the Commonwealth, and, with hearty and humble affection, we promise him faith and obedience:

May King Charles III have long and happy years to reign over us.

Given at Canberra this eleventh day of September, Two thousand and twenty two, and in the first year of His Majesty's reign.

=== State proclamations ===
==== New South Wales ====
The proclamation ceremony in New South Wales took place on the steps of the New South Wales Parliament House, Sydney, on 11 September and was read by Governor Margaret Beazley. The ceremony was followed by a 21-gun salute from the grounds of Government House. Public transport was made free for the day for the ceremony. The New South Wales Police Force estimated that approximately 5,000 people attended.

The proclamation occurred after a meeting of the New South Wales Executive Council earlier that day, presided over by Governor Margaret Beazley at Government House. In the meeting, Premier Dominic Perrottet and other state ministers recommended that the Governor proclaim Charles III as King of Australia, which the Governor accepted.

WHEREAS because of the death of our blessed and glorious Queen Elizabeth the Second, the Crown has solely and rightfully come to Prince Charles Philip Arthur George:

We, therefore, Her Excellency the Honourable Margaret Beazley AC KC, Governor of the State of New South Wales in the Commonwealth of Australia, and members of the Executive Council, do now proclaim Prince Charles Philip Arthur George to be King Charles the Third, by the Grace of God King of Australia and his other Realms and Territories, Head of the Commonwealth, and, with hearty and humble affection, we promise him faith and obedience:

May King Charles the Third have long and happy years to reign over us.

Given at Sydney, this eleventh day of September, Two thousand and twenty two, and in the first year of His Majesty’s reign.

...

GOD SAVE THE KING!

==== Victoria ====
The proclamation in Victoria took place at Government House in Melbourne on 12 September and was read by Governor Linda Dessau, who re-swore Lieutenant-Governor James Angus and acting Supreme Court chief justice Karin Emerton to their posts under a constitutional requirement. The ceremony was also attended by Premier Daniel Andrews and Opposition Leader Matthew Guy.

The proclamation was jointly signed by Dassau, Andrews, Emerton, Legislative Assembly speaker Maree Edwards, and the President of the Legislative Council Nazih Elasmar.

On 13 September, Edwards read the proclamation in the Parliament of Victoria, after which all Legislative Assembly MPs were required to swear allegiance to King Charles under the state's constitution. Samantha Ratnam, the leader of the Victorian Greens party, criticised this requirement as absurd.

WE, the undersigned, do hereby proclaim our late Sovereign Queen Elizabeth the Second, by the Grace of God, Queen of Australia and Her other Realms and Territories, Head of the Commonwealth is deceased and that by the death of our late sovereign, the Crown has solely and rightfully come to His Royal Highness Prince Charles Philip Arthur George, Prince of Wales, Knight of the Order of Australia who is now His Majesty King Charles the Third, by the Grace of God, King of Australia and His other Realms and Territories, Head of the Commonwealth. God save the King!

Given at Melbourne this 12th day of September in the Year of our Lord Two thousand and twenty two, and in the first year of the reign of His Majesty King Charles the Third.

==== Queensland ====
The proclamation in Queensland was held first at Government House and later at Parliament House in Brisbane on 11 September. It was read by Governor Jeannette Young. Premier Annastacia Palaszczuk attended both ceremonies and delivered a tribute to Queen Elizabeth II. An estimated 2,300 Queenslanders attended the ceremony at Government House, according to the state government.

WHEREAS because of the death of our blessed and glorious Queen Elizabeth the Second, the Crown has solely and rightfully come to Prince Charles Philip Arthur George:

We, therefore, DR JEANNETTE ROSITA YOUNG AC PSM, Governor of Queensland and its dependencies, in the Commonwealth of Australia, and members of the Queensland Executive Council, do now proclaim Prince Charles Philip Arthur George to be King Charles the Third, by the Grace of God King of Australia and his other Realms and Territories, Head of the Commonwealth, and, with hearty and humble affection, we promise him faith and obedience:

May King Charles the Third have long and happy years to reign over us.

Given at Brisbane this eleventh day of September, two thousand and twenty-two, and in the first year of His Majesty's reign.

==== Western Australia ====
The proclamation in Western Australia took place at Government House in Perth on 11 September and was read by Governor Chris Dawson. It was signed by Dawson and Premier Mark McGowan.

Whereas because of the death of our blessed and glorious Queen Elizabeth the Second, the Crown has solely and rightfully come to Prince Charles Philip Arthur George:

We, therefore, His Excellency the Honourable Christopher John Dawson APM, Governor of the State of Western Australia, and members of the Executive Council do proclaim Prince Charles Philip Arthur George to be King Charles the Third, by the Grace of God King of Australia and his other Realms and Territories, Head of the Commonwealth, and, with hearty and humble affection, we promise him faith and obedience:

May King Charles the Third have long and happy years to reign over us.

Given at Perth this eleventh day of September 2022 and in the first year of His Majesty’s reign.

==== South Australia ====
The proclamation in South Australia took place outside the South Australian Parliament House in Adelaide on 11 September and was read by Governor Frances Adamson. The ceremony was attended by Premier Peter Malinauskas, Speaker of the House of Assembly Dan Cregan, President of the Legislative Council Terry Stephens, and other officials. An estimated 8,000 South Australians gathered to witness it.

WHEREAS because of the death of our blessed and glorious Queen Elizabeth the Second, the Crown has solely and rightfully come to Prince Charles Philip Arthur George:

We, therefore, Her Excellency the Honourable Frances Jennifer Adamson, Companion of the Order of Australia, Governor in and over the State of South Australia, and members of the Executive Council, do now proclaim Prince Charles Philip Arthur George to be King Charles the Third, by the Grace of God King of Australia and his other Realms and Territories, Head of the Commonwealth, and, with hearty and humble affection, we promise him faith and obedience:

May King Charles the Third have long and happy years to reign over us. Given at Adelaide this eleventh day of September, Two thousand and twenty-two, and in the first year of His Majesty’s reign.

==== Tasmania ====
The proclamation in Tasmania took place at Government House in Hobart on 11 September. The text was read and signed by Governor Barbara Baker and Premier Jeremy Rockliff. Anglican Bishop of Tasmania Richard Condie later read the Collect for the Monarch from the 1662 Book of Common Prayer.

WHEREAS because of the death of our blessed and glorious Queen Elizabeth the Second, the Crown has solely and rightfully come to Prince Charles Philip Arthur George:

We, therefore, Her Excellency THE HONOURABLE BARBARA BAKER AC, Governor of Tasmania, and members of the Executive Council, do now proclaim Prince Charles Philip Arthur George to be King Charles the Third, by the Grace of God King of Australia and his other Realms and Territories, Head of the Commonwealth, and, with hearty and humble affection, we promise him faith and obedience:

May King Charles the Third have long and happy years to reign over us.

Given at Hobart this eleventh day of September, Two thousand and twenty-two, and in the first year of His Majesty's reign.

== New Zealand ==
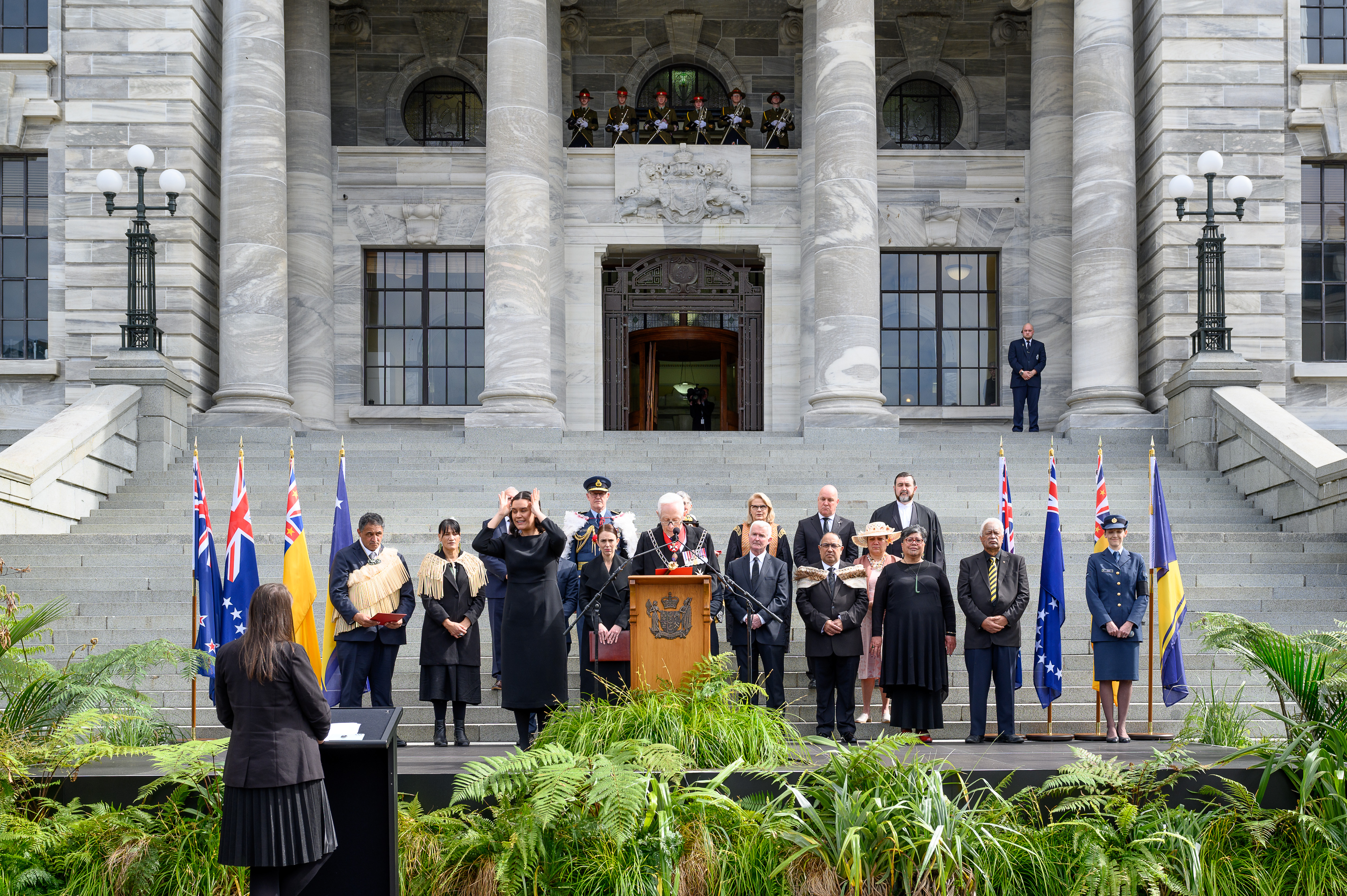
New Zealand Herald Extraordinary Phillip O'Shea reads the proclamation on the steps of the New Zealand Parliament Buildings

The proclamation of Charles as King of New Zealand took place on the steps of the Parliament Buildings in Wellington at 12:30 pm NZST on 11 September. As the Accession Council in the United Kingdom was a British event, it had no constitutional effect in New Zealand.

After the national anthem, "God Defend New Zealand", was sung by LAC Barbara Graham in Māori and English, parliamentary kaumātua Kura Moeahu offered a karakia.

The proclamation was read first in English and then in Māori, following speeches by Prime Minister Jacinda Ardern and Governor-General Cindy Kiro. The ceremony concluded with a 21-gun salute fired from Point Jerningham by the 16th Field Regiment. A second 21-gun salute was fired at the same time from the Devonport Naval Base in Auckland.

=== Text of proclamation ===
The proclamation was read in English by the New Zealand Herald of Arms Extraordinary, Phillip O'Shea:

Whereas by the death of our late beloved Sovereign Queen Elizabeth II, the Crown is solely and rightfully come to His Royal Highness Prince Charles Philip Arthur George.

We, therefore, The Right Honourable Dame Cindy Kiro, Governor-General of New Zealand, The Right Honourable Jacinda Ardern, Prime Minister of New Zealand, and Members of the Executive Council, assisted by members of Parliament, Judges, Representatives of the Realm, and numerous other representative citizens here present, hereby proclaim that His Royal Highness Prince Charles Philip Arthur George is now King Charles III, By the Grace of God King of New Zealand and of His Other Realms and Territories, Head of the Commonwealth, Defender of the Faith, to whom His subjects swear their faith and true allegiance, with hearty affection; wishing His Majesty King Charles III a long and happy reign.

Given under the hand of Her Excellency the Governor-General, and issued under the Seal of New Zealand, this 11th day of September 2022.

God Save the King

It was then read in Māori by Kura Moeahu:

Nā te matenga o tō tātou Ariki Tapairu e tino arohaina ana, o Kuini Irihāpeti te Tuarua, ka tika kia whakatauria ai te Karauna ki Te Mana Ariki, ki a Charles Philip Arthur George.

Nā reira ko tā mātou, ko Te Hōnore Nui Cindy Kiro, te Kāwana-Tianara o Aotearoa, Ko Te Hōnore Nui Jacinda Ardern, te Pirimia o Aotearoa, ko ngā Mema o te Kaunihera Matua, i te taha o ngā mema Pāremata, o ngā Kaiwhakawā, o ngā Māngai o te Karauna, o ētahi atu Māngai Kirirarau tokomaha ko tā mātou he pānui atu i te aupikinga o Te Mana Whare Ariki Charles Philip Arthur George kia Kīngi Tiāre te Tuatoru, i runga i te Atawhai o te Atua, ko Ia te Kīngi o Aotearoa me Ērā Atu o Ōna Whenua, Rohe hoki, ko Ia te Upoko o te Kotahitanga o Ngā Whenua i Raro i Tōna Maru, ko Ia te Kaipupuri i te Mana o te Hāhi Mihingare; ko tā Ōna iwi he oati i te whakapono me te tautoko mutunga kore, ka nui te maioha ki Te Arikinui Kīngi Tiāre te Tuatoru, me te wawata kia roa, kia hari nui tana noho hei Kīngi.

He pānui tēnei nā te ringa o Te Kahurangi Kāwana-Tianara, e tukuna ana i raro i te mana o te Hīra o Aotearoa, i tēnei rā, te 11 o Hepetema, 2022.

E te atua tohungia te Kīngi

== Jamaica ==
On 10 September, a 21-gun salute was conducted by the Jamaica Defence Force at its headquarters at Up-Park Camp in recognition of the British proclamation.

The proclamation ceremony for Jamaica took place at King's House in Kingston on 13 September, and the proclamation was read by Governor-General Patrick Allen.

=== Text of proclamation ===
Whereas on the passing of Her Majesty Queen Elizabeth II, and by virtue of the Accession Act of the United Kingdom and the Constitution of Jamaica, His Royal Highness Prince Charles Philip Arthur George has succeeded Her Majesty as the Constitutional Sovereign.

I, therefore, Patrick Linton Allen, Governor-General of Jamaica, hereby proclaim that King Charles III is, By the Grace of God, King of Jamaica and of his Other Realms and Territories, Head of the Commonwealth, Defender of the Faith, and wish His Majesty King Charles III good health and longevity in his Reign.

Given under my hand and the Broad Seal of Jamaica at King’s House this 13th day of September in the Year of our Lord Two Thousand and Twenty- Two, and the First Year of the Reign of His Majesty King Charles III.

GOD SAVE THE KING

== Antigua and Barbuda ==
The proclamation in Antigua and Barbuda took place at Government House in St. John's on 10 September. The document was signed by Prime Minister Gaston Browne, who later stated that the country might hold a referendum on the monarchy within the next three years.

== The Bahamas ==
The proclamation in the Bahamas took place at Parliament Square in Nassau on 11 September. It was signed by Governor-General Cornelius A. Smith. The ceremony was attended by Prime Minister Philip Davis, members of the judiciary, diplomatic corps, Senators, MPs, and other officials. It was accompanied by a fanfare trumpet and a 21-gun salute by the Royal Bahamas Defence Force.

=== Text of proclamation ===
The proclamation was read by Hubert Ingraham, the former Prime Minister of the Bahamas.

WHEREAS, our late Sovereign Queen Elizabeth the Second died on the 8th day of September, 2022, and by whose death the Crown of the Commonwealth of The Bahamas now solely and rightfully comes to Prince Charles Philip Arthur George:

NOW THEREFORE, I, THE MOST HONOURABLE SIR CORNELIUS SMITH, GOVERNOR-GENERAL OF THE COMMONWEALTH OF THE BAHAMAS along with the President and Members of the Senate, the Speaker and Members of the House of Assembly, and the Members of her late Majesty’s Privy Council in the Realm of The Commonwealth of The Bahamas, with one voice and consent, publish and proclaim that King Charles III, by the death of our late Sovereign Queen Elizabeth the Second, is now formally proclaimed Sovereign of the Commonwealth of The Bahamas.

GIVEN under my hand and the Public Seal of the Commonwealth of The Bahamas at Government House in the City of Nassau this 11th day of September, 2022 and in the First year of His Majesty’s Reign.

GOD SAVE THE KING

== Grenada ==
The proclamation in Grenada took place at Government House in St. George's on 12 September and was read by Governor-General Cécile La Grenade. It was signed by La Grenade and Prime Minister Dickon Mitchell.

=== Text of proclamation ===
WHEREAS it hath pleased Almighty God to call to His Mercy Our Late Sovereign Lady Queen Elizabeth the Second of blessed and glorious memory by whose decease the Crown is solely and rightfully come to the High and Mighty Prince Charles Philip Arthur George;

WE, therefore, Cécile Ellen Fleurette La Grenade, Governor-General of Grenada, The Honourable Dickon Mitchell, Prime Minister of Grenada, assisted by other Members of the Houses of Parliament and citizens here present, do now hereby, with one voice and consent of tongue and heart, publish and proclaim that the High and Mighty Prince Charles Philip Arthur George is now, by the death of our late Sovereign of happy and glorious memory, become our only lawful and rightful Lord Charles the Third by the Grace of God, King of Grenada and of His other Realms and Territories, Head of the Commonwealth, to whom we acknowledge all faith and constant obedience with all hearty and humble affection, beseeching God, by whom all Kings and Queens do reign, to bless the Royal King Charles the Third with long and happy years to reign over us.

GIVEN at St. George, this 12th day of September, 2022.

GOD SAVE THE KING.

== Solomon Islands ==
Charles was officially declared King of Solomon Islands on 12 September after Governor-General David Vunagi read the proclamation issued by the Accession Council in Honiara.

== Papua New Guinea ==
The proclamation in Papua New Guinea took place at National Parliament House in Port Moresby on 13 September and was officiated by Governor-General Bob Dadae. The ceremony was attended by Prime Minister James Marape, Deputy Prime Minister John Rosso, Speaker of the National Parliament Job Pomat, and other officials. It included a 96-gun salute and a moment of silence in honour of the Queen.

=== Text of proclamation ===
Governor-General Bob Dadae read the proclamation at the ceremony.

Acknowledging the death of Queen Elizabeth II, the Crown is now solely and rightfully bestowed on His Royal Highness Prince Charles Philip Arthur George.

Therefore, we, Grand Chief Sir Bob Bofeng Dadae, the Governor General of the Independent State of Papua New Guinea, the Honorable James Marape, Prime Minister of the Independent State of Papua New Guinea, Members of the National Executive Council, the Honorable Job Pomat, Speaker of the National Parliament, Members of Parliament, His Honor, Sir Gibbs Salika, Chief Justice of the Independent State of Papua New Guinea, Judges, Representatives of our ordinary citizens here present, hereby proclaim that His Royal Highness Prince Charles Philip Arthur George is now King Charles III, and by the Grace of God, King of Papua New Guinea, and of his other realms and territories and the Head of the Commonwealth.

We wish His Majesty King Charles III a long and happy reign.

Given under the hand of His Excellency, the Governor General, Grand Chief Sir Bob Bofeng Dadae, and issued under the seal of Papua New Guinea, this 13th day of September 2022.

God save the King!

== Saint Vincent and the Grenadines ==
Saint Vincent and the Grenadines issued the proclamation in relation to King Charles III under the hand of the deputy of Governor-General Susan Dougan.

== See also ==
- Proclamation of accession of Elizabeth II (1952)
- Coronation of Charles III and Camilla
