= Gerard Slevin =

Gerard Slevin (1 November 1919 – 18 January 1997) was Chief Herald of Ireland from 1954 to 1981.

Born in Cork, Slevin was assistant to Edward MacLysaght, the Chief Herald of Ireland, from 1944 to 1954, at which time he succeeded McLysaght.

== Career ==
During his time as Chief Herald, Slevin inaugurated a genealogy advisory service, to assist in requests for help from people of Irish ancestry. Slevin granted the Kennedy family of the United States their coat of arms in 1961.

Slevin was also heavily involved in the design of the European flag, a circle of 12 golden stars on a deep blue background, and in recognition of this was made a member of the Académie Internationale d'Héraldique. His exact role in the design is uncertain (and may continue to remain so). According to some sources (such as archivist and biographer Dr. Susan Hood), he was the actual designer of the flag; others (such as Tom McCarthy, president of the Genealogical Society of Ireland) suggest a more peripheral role. The story that the flag's design was solely that of Slevin continues, however.
