= Annulet (heraldry) =

Heraldic symbol

Annulets as regular charges (not as a difference). Gules, three annulets in pile Argent

In heraldry, an annulet (i.e. "little ring") is a common charge, which can be described as a roundel that has been "voided" (i.e. with its centre cut out).

In the 19th century, it was theorised by Webster's Dictionary to be related to the custom of prelates to receive their investiture per baculum et annulum ('by rod and ring'). In English and Canadian heraldry it is also used as the difference mark of a fifth son.
