= Fraser Herald =

- Badge of the Fraser Herald of Arms
- Heraldic tradition: Gallo-British
- Jurisdiction: Canada
- Governing body: Canadian Heraldic Authority

Fraser Herald of Arms (Héraut Fraser in French) is the title of one of the officers of arms at the Canadian Heraldic Authority in Ottawa. Like the other heralds' offices at the Authority, it is named for a Canadian river. Since the inception of the office, Fraser Herald of Arms has been the principal artist of the Canadian Heraldic Authority, responsible for overseeing the artwork created for all grants of arms emanating from the Authority.

The design of the badge of office of Fraser Herald of Arms combines symbolism of the sun and water. This is indicative of the fact that the Fraser River is the most important river in British Columbia, which features a sun on its provincial coat of arms. Traditionally, water is depicted in heraldry by white and blue wavy stripes, and the substitution here of gold for white makes a reference to the gold deposits in the Fraser River. At the center of the badge is a cinquefoil, a stylized heraldic strawberry flower of five petals. As this is a feature of coats of arms within the Scottish Clan Fraser (canting arms on fraisier, French for strawberry plant), it pays tribute to the river's namesake, the explorer Simon Fraser. The badge can be blazoned as 'A sun in splendour the disk barry wavy azure and or charged with a fraise argent the straight rays or the wavy azure' (Canadian Public Register).

== Holders of the office ==
- 1989-2025 Cathy Bursey-Sabourin

== See also ==
- Herald
- Royal Heraldry Society of Canada
