= Chief Herald of Canada =

Head of the Canadian Heraldic Authority

- Héraut d'armes du Canada
- The coat of arms and batons of office of the Chief Herald of Canada
- Incumbent; Samy Khalid since 20 May 2020
- Canadian Heraldic Authority
- Reports to: Herald Chancellor of Canada
- Seat: Rideau Hall, Ottawa
- Appointer: Governor General of Canada
- Constituting instrument: Royal Letters Patent, 1988
- Formation: 4 June 1988
- First holder: Robert Watt

The Chief Herald of Canada (French: Héraut d'armes du Canada) is the director of the Canadian Heraldic Authority (CHA) and is responsible for the authority's day-to-day operations, although the Herald Chancellor of Canada is the authority's seniormost officer.

The chief herald typically handles petitions for arms and makes the grant of arms if the petition meets eligibility requirements. There have been three chief heralds since the CHA's inception in 1988, with Samy Khalid being the latest appointee on 20 May 2020.

== Responsibilities ==
The chief herald of Canada is the chief administrative officer of heraldry in Canada, serving as the director of the Canadian Heraldic Authority and is responsible for its day-to-day operations. The CHA was created by the governor general of Canada after they were authorized to exercise the Sovereign's powers related to heraldry in Canada.

Although the chief herald oversees the CHA's day-to-day operations, the institution is formally headed by the governor general, with the Herald Chancellor of Canada serving as its most senior officer and providing overall leadership and direction. In this way, the chief herald is similar to the Garter Principal King of Arms, who manages the English College of Arms' daily operations, on behalf of the Earl Marshal.

The chief herald receives petitions requesting a grant of arms from individuals who are seeking their own arms. If the chief herald believes the petition meets the eligibility requirements for a grant, they will seek a warrant from the Herald Chancellor or their deputies to grant the arms. After the warrant is approved, the case will be turned over to one of the CHA's heralds to supervise the rest of the process.

Concept designs developed by the assigned herald are reviewed and approved by the chief herald, who also provides the seals on the grant document for the arms. Most grant of arms are issued by the chief herald, although the governor general may also issue their own grants through the exercise of their royal prerogative.

=== Proclamation of accession ===
Shortly after the death of Elizabeth II in September 2022, the chief herald led a procession made up of the governor general and the Privy Council for Canada after they had convened at Rideau Hall to sign the proclamation of accession of Charles III. After the chief herald led the procession outside Rideau Hall, they read aloud the proclamation of the accession in both English and French.

== Ceremonial items ==
Ceremonial items used by the chief herald include a baton, a collar of office, and a tabard.

=== Baton ===
The carrying of a baton by heralds was transplanted from British heraldic tradition. The baton of the chief herald of Canada was initially created as a heraldic device featured on the grant of arms for the chief herald in 1989. However, a physical baton was not created for the chief herald until 2006.

The baton is made out of arbutus wood and is 45 centimetres (18 in) in length. The baton has a predominantly white background, although its flared-out ends are painted red, representing the national colours of Canada. Down the length of the baton is a blue stripe spiral charged with white maple leaves, symbolic of Canada's rivers from which the names of the CHA's other heralds are derived. The chief herald's arms are also painted near the flared-out ends of the baton. The baton was painted by Cathy Bursey-Sabourin, the Fraser Herald.

=== Collar of office ===
The collar of office for the chief herald was unveiled alongside the other collars of office for the CHA's heralds in May 2009 by then Governor General Michaëlle Jean, following a reception to celebrate the CHA's 20th anniversary at Rideau Hall. The collar consists of an interlinked chain resembling Cs, as opposed to the collars worn by heralds of the English College of Arms. The bottom of the collar is the shield of the CHA and a sprig of four maple leaves and an enamelled heraldic badge of the chief herald hung underneath.

=== Tabard ===
In May 2009, Governor General Michaëlle Jean announced the creation of a heraldic tabard for the chief herald to wear on special occasions. The impetus for its creation was partly driven by the Royal Heraldry Society of Canada, who also agreed to finance part of its creation. The tabard was publicly unveiled in May 2012, during an opening of an exhibit by Governor General David Johnston.

The tabard weighs 2 kilograms (4.4 lb) and is coloured in royal blue, a colour emblematic of the governor general. The tabard is made up of four sections that include several symbols. Its body is embroidered with stripes of alternating maple leaves with raven-bears at the body's centre. The raven-bears are derived from the supporters of the arms of the CHA, and were designed in the emblematic tradition of Coast Salish and Kwakwakaʼwakw nation. The arms of the Sovereign are embroidered on the tabard's sleeves.

== Officeholders ==
The office of chief herald has existed since the inception of the CHA in 1988. Appointees include:

- 1988–2007: Robert Watt
- 2007–2020: Claire Boudreau
- 2020–present: Samy Khalid

== See also ==
- Canadian heraldry
- Officer of arms
