= Canadian Heraldic Authority =

Part of the Canadian honours system

- Coat of arms of the CHA

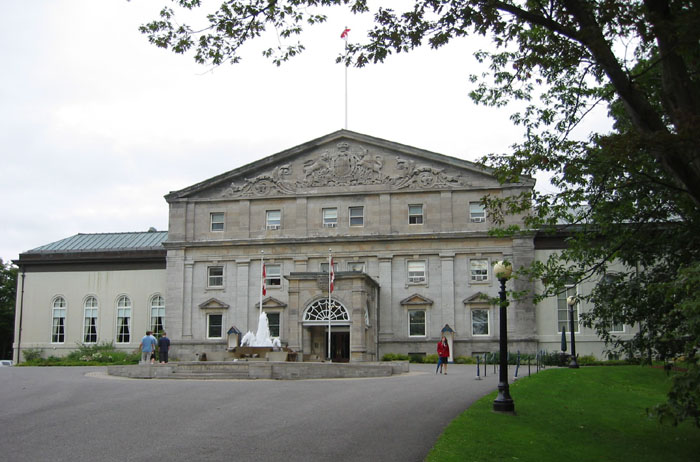
- Rideau Hall, seat of the CHA
- Abbreviation: CHA
- Formation: June 4, 1988
- Type: Heraldic authority
- Headquarters: Rideau Hall, Ottawa, Ontario
- Region served: Canada
- Official language: English, French
- Chief Herald: Samy Khalid
- Website: gg.ca/canadian-heraldic-authority

The Canadian Heraldic Authority (CHA; French: Autorité héraldique du Canada) is part of the Canadian honours system under the Canadian monarch, whose authority is exercised by the Governor General of Canada. The authority is responsible for the creation and granting of new coats of arms (armorial bearings), flags, and badges for Canadian citizens, government agencies, municipal, civic and other corporate bodies. The authority also registers existing armorial bearings granted by other recognized heraldic authorities, approves military badges, flags, and other insignia of the Canadian Forces, and provides information on heraldic practices.

The CHA is the Canadian counterpart of the College of Arms in London, the Court of the Lord Lyon in Scotland, the Office of the Chief Herald of Ireland in the Republic of Ireland, and U.S. Army Institute of Heraldry for federal agencies of the United States.

== History ==
Now know Ye that We, by and with the advice of our Privy Council of Canada, do by these presents authorize and empower Our Governor General of Canada to exercise or provide for the exercise of all power and authorities lawfully belonging to Us as Queen of Canada in respect of the granting of armorial bearings in Canada.

— From the Letters Patent,1988

Prior to the creation of the Canadian Heraldic Authority, Canadians wishing to obtain a legally granted coat of arms had to apply to one of the two heraldic offices in the United Kingdom: either the College of Arms in London or the Court of the Lord Lyon in Edinburgh. This process was quite lengthy—and costly. In addition, the heralds of the College of Arms and the Court of the Lord Lyon could sometimes be unfamiliar with Canadian history and symbols. In time, many Canadians with an interest in heraldry began calling for an office which would offer armorial bearings designed by and for Canadians.

As early as 1967, plans were reportedly in the works to transfer overview of heraldry from the College of Arms in the UK to Canada. The push for a wholly Canadian heraldic system came largely from the Heraldry Society of Canada (now the Royal Heraldry Society of Canada) almost from its inception, though it was not seen as a priority by successive national governments. In 1986, Vicki Huntington, a politician from British Columbia, forwarded a brief written by the RHSC calling for the creation of the Canadian Heraldic Authority to a staff member in then-Secretary of State David Crombie's office. Crombie had his department organize a meeting in Ottawa the following year, to which many national and international heraldic experts were invited. The meeting concluded with "a strong recommendation to government that an Authority be created."

Two years later, Queen Elizabeth II issued the 1988 letters patent authorizing the governor general "to exercise or provide for the exercise of all powers and authorities lawfully belonging to Us as Queen of Canada in respect of the granting of armorial bearings in Canada". These letters patent were presented by Prince Edward to the governor general on behalf of the Crown. Subsequently, the Governor General, Jeanne Sauvé, authorized the creation of the Canadian Heraldic Authority on June 4, 1988. As a result, Canada became the first Commonwealth realm outside the United Kingdom to have its own heraldic authority. Canada also provides full equality to women in terms of inheriting and transmitting arms. Additionally, all armigers within Canada may file for trademark protection of their grant of arms under the Trade-Marks Act.

== Structure ==
Governor General representing the King of Canada
Herald Chancellor (Secretary to the GG); Office of the Governor General
Deputy Herald Chancellor (Deputy Secretary to the GG); Chancellery of Honours
Chief Herald; Canadian Heraldic Authority
Heralds

The authority is located at Rideau Hall in Ottawa, the official residence of the monarch and the governor general. The governor general, as the personal representative of the Canadian monarch, is the highest authority in Canadian heraldry. Below the governor general is the Herald Chancellor, a position held by the Secretary to the Governor General. The CHA is currently organized in an office called the Chancellery of Honours, which is the same office that issues Canadian orders and decorations, such as the Order of Canada. The deputy secretary that administers the Chancellery of Honours is also the Deputy Herald Chancellor.

The Chief Herald of Canada, whose job is to oversee and direct all operations of the CHA, bears the main responsibility of granting arms, though the governor general has the authority to grant arms directly. The position of chief herald was inaugurated by Robert Watt at the inception of the CHA in 1988 and held by him until his retirement in 2007. Since May 20, 2020, the office of chief herald has been held by Samy Khalid.

=== Heralds of Arms ===
Below the chief herald are the Heralds of Arms, full-time workers at the CHA and considered part of the Public Service of Canada. The names of the various offices were taken from significant Canadian rivers. Though the titles are territorial designations, as per heraldic tradition, each herald serves the entire country. Each is assigned a badge of office. The Heralds of Arms are:

Badge of Office	Title	Duties	Incumbent
	Saint-Laurent	Registrar of the Authority, deals mainly with records, such as the Public Register of Arms, Flags and Badges of Canada. This herald is also the custodian of the authority's seal.	Bruce Patterson (2008–)
	Fraser	Principal artist of the Authority, responsible for overseeing the artwork produced for each grant of arms.	Cathy Bursey-Sabourin (1989–)
	Saguenay	Assistant Registrar of the Authority. Both Saguenay and Saint-Laurent are responsible for the grant and registration documents in both English and French.	Samy Khalid (2014–2020) Alix Chartrand (2020-)
	Assiniboine		Darrel Kennedy (2002–)
	Miramichi		Teva Vidal (2017–2020) Fabienne Fusade (2020-)
	Coppermine	Assistant artist of the Authority, supporting Fraser Herald.	Catherine Fitzpatrick (2003–)
	Athabaska	One of the original three heralds, vacant since 2001.	Vacant (2001-) Charles Maier (1988-2001)

=== Honorary positions ===
The authority also allows for two types of honorary positions: Heralds Emeritus and Heralds Extraordinary. The emeritus title is reserved for Canadian heralds who have retired; the title of extraordinary is an honorary position for those who have made notable contributions to heraldry. Honorary heralds can be enlisted by the CHA to perform work for them. Each honorary position grants the individual a badge and a title also based on a Canadian river.

Current holders of honorary positions

Badge of Office	Title	Holder	Appointed
	Outaouais Herald Emeritus	Auguste Vachon	2000
	Albion Herald Extraordinary	Ralph Spence	2006
	Rideau Herald Emeritus	Robert Watt	2007

Past holders of honorary positions

Badge of Office	Title	Holder	Appointed	Left office
	Capilano Herald Extraordinary	Helen Mussallem	2006	2012
	Cowichan Herald Extraordinary	Graham Anderson	1999	2012
	Dauphin Herald Extraordinary	Robert Pichette	1995	2019
	Margaree-Chéticamp Herald Emeritus	Claire Boudreau	2020	2020
	Rouge Herald Extraordinary	Roger Lindsay	2006	2023
	Niagara Herald Extraordinary	Gordon Macpherson	1999	2023

== Obtaining arms ==
=== Eligibility ===
Any Canadian citizen or corporate body can petition for a grant of new arms or registration of existing arms. In general, eligibility for a grant of arms is based on an individual's contributions to the community, although the exact criteria for grants or registrations have not been published. A number of grants have been made to people who have already been recognized with state honours for their notable achievements, such as through admission to the Order of Canada, and who are accordingly entitled to a grant of arms. Those who are Companions of the order may also request the chief herald to grant them supporters.

=== Grant process ===
In order to request either a coat of arms, flag, and/or badges, a letter must be addressed to the Chief Herald of Canada. The letter must clearly ask "to receive armorial bearings from the Canadian Crown under the powers exercised by the Governor General" and include proof of Canadian citizenship or permanent residence as well as a biography or curriculum vitae of the petitioner. Corporate petitions must include a brief history of the company, proof of incorporation in Canada, financial reports, and a copy of the corporation's governing body resolution seeking a grant of arms.

The Chief Herald of Canada can approve or reject the petition. The granting of arms is regarded as an honour from the monarch, via the governor general, and thus are bestowed only on those whom the Chief Herald has deemed individuals worthy of receiving a grant of arms. If the petition is approved, the authority to make the grant is given through a warrant signed by the Herald Chancellor or the Deputy Herald Chancellor. The authorisation is then sent to one of the heralds, and the process begins.

First, the assigned herald develops a written description based on consultation with the petitioner. The petitioner then signs a contract with an artist at the authority to create the design. The Fraser Herald, serving as the CHA's principal artist, must review the design. At all stages the documents must be approved by both the petitioner and the Chief Herald. The final step is to prepare the letters patent, the official notice of an award of arms, which includes a drawing of the armorial bearings and the accompanying legal text and explanation of the symbolism of the bearings. Under Canadian bilingualism laws, letters patent are written in both English and French, though the petitioner may choose which language will be placed in the left column of the document.

Until 2023, completed grant documents were recorded in the Public Register of Arms, Flags and Badges of Canada and the notice of the grant was published in the Canada Gazette, Part I, under the section "Government House".

The Government of Canada requires that the above processes be financed by the petitioner; that is the person requesting the grant or registration of arms, who pays the fees associated with the request and grant/registration. In Canada, the petitioner does not "buy" a coat of arms, the arms themselves are freely given to qualified individuals, but fees must be paid to the heralds and artists for the services rendered. The average time needed to complete a grant is about 12 to 14 months, though it can take longer for particularly detailed or intricate arms.

=== Online grant application ===
From July 20, 2021, the Canadian Heraldic Authority announced on its Facebook page the launch of online grant application forms, in an effort to modernize the institution and make the "900-year-old tradition" available to all those who are eligible.

=== Registration of existing arms ===
Those individuals and institutions who already possess legitimate awards of arms may apply to the Canadian Heraldic Authority to have their arms registered. There is no cost associated with application for registration and it takes less time, approximately three months, than application for a new award of arms.

== Coat of arms of the CHA ==
=== Blazon ===
Armorial achievement of the Canadian Heraldic Authority

The blazon, or technical description in heraldic language, of the full armorial bearings is below, along with its plain English description:

Crest
Upon a helmet mantled Gules doubled Argent within a wreath of these colours a lion passant guardant Or royally crowned Proper its dexter forepaw resting on an escutcheon Argent charged with a maple leaf Gules.
On top of a helmet with red and white mantling (stylised cloth streamers, here further stylised to look like maple leaves, as in the national coat of arms) stands a golden lion wearing a crown, holding in his paw a white shield with a red maple leaf.
Shield
Argent on a maple leaf Gules an escutcheon Argent.
On a white shield is a red maple leaf, upon which is another white shield.
Supporters
On a representation of an outcrop of the Canadian Shield proper strewn with maple leaves Gules and maple seeds Or two raven-bears Gules over Argent wings elevated Gules beaked and armed Or.
A portion of the Canadian Shield is shown covered with red maple leaves and gold maple seeds. Standing upon this on either side are two red-and-white raven-bears with golden beaks and claws.
Motto
Honorentur patriam honorantes (Latin for 'Let us honour those who honour our country')

=== Symbolism and use ===
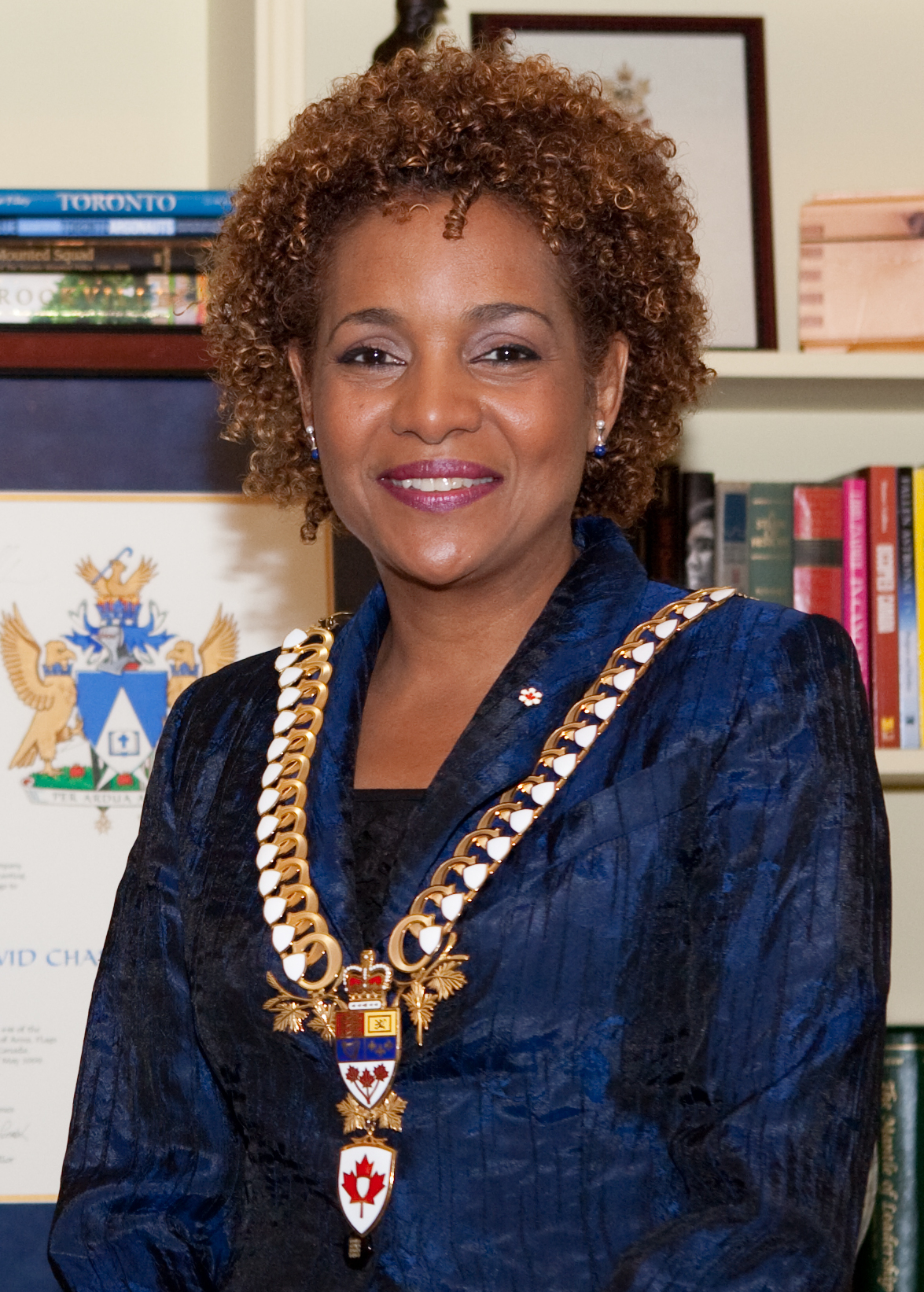
Governor General Michaëlle Jean wearing the collar of office of head of the CHA. The escutcheon of the CHA's coat of arms is incorporated into the collar's design.

The current arms of the authority were confirmed in a warrant by the Governor General on 15 January 1994, in honour of the authority's fifth anniversary, which was celebrated the previous year. The full armorial bearings of the Canadian Heraldic Authority incorporate aboriginal symbolism, as seen in the mythical raven-bears, as well as the national symbol of the maple leaf and the traditional Canadian colours of red and white, which were made official by King George V in 1921.

The crest is a modification of the Royal Crest of Canada: a lion wearing a crown and bearing a maple leaf. The crest of the authority features the same lion, instead holding a white shield containing a red maple leaf, symbolising the governor general's authority under the Crown to grant armorial bearings to Canadians.

The shield itself is white with a red maple leaf, similar to the middle portion of the Canadian flag. The white shield upon the leaf represents "a sign of heraldry to be created and recorded for Canadians."

The raven-bears, a new heraldic beast which combined several creatures that are important to aboriginal symbolism, were proposed by the heralds in honour of the United Nations' International Year of the World's Indigenous Peoples, also occurring in 1993. The raven-bears are standing on an outcrop of what is known as the Canadian Shield, a geological formation which the authority foundation is based on. The Canadian Shield is formed by rocks, which are covered in red coloured maple leaves and by golden maple seeds. The motto that was chosen is Latin for Let us honour those who honour our country.

The shield and crest alone comprise the heraldic badge of the CHA, which is used on the seal of the Authority and on the letters patent that grant and register armorial bearings. A wreath around the shield is composed of red maple leaves bound with gold straps.

Badge of the CHA

Banner of arms

== See also ==
- Bureau of Heraldry (South Africa)
- Council of Heraldry and Vexillology (Belgium)
- Flemish Heraldic Council
- New Zealand Herald Extraordinary
