= Académie internationale d'Héraldique =

L'Académie internationale d'Héraldique (known in English as the International Academy of Heraldry) was founded in Paris in 1949 to bring together experts in heraldry representing the various areas of the world. Admission is by election, and the number of active academicians is limited to 75. There is no limit to the number of associate members.

The general assembly usually meets once a year, and the headquarters of L'Académie are in Switzerland. The Académie's aim is to centralize the heraldic studies on the basis of the largest possible international cooperation. Applications for admission are addressed to L'Académie in writing and must have the sponsorship of to members of the Council. On a bi-yearly basis, the Académie holds the International Heraldic Colloquium. Recent colloquia have been held in Antwerp (2019), Lund (2022) and Iași (2025).

Since 2022, the president of the Académie has been Elizabeth Roads, (UK) with Peter Kurrild-Klitgaard as secretary general.

== Prominent members of L'Académie ==
- Luigi Borgia (born in Rome in 1941 and died in Arezzo in 2023, former director of the State Archive of Arezzo and professor of heraldry at the School of Archival and Paleography of the State Archive of Florence)
- Claire Boudreau
- D'Arcy Boulton
- Cecil Humphery-Smith
- Michel Pastoureau
- Hervé Pinoteau (former vice president of the Académie Internationale d'Héraldique and historian).
- Elizabeth Roads
- Gerard Slevin
- Hallvard Trætteberg
- Auguste Vachon
- Robert Watt

== See also ==
- International Congress of Genealogical and Heraldic Sciences
