= Auguste Vachon =

Canadian officer of arms

Auguste Georges Vachon, AIH FRHSC is a Canadian officer of arms. He held the post of Saint-Laurent Herald of Arms in Ordinary at the Canadian Heraldic Authority from its foundation in 1988 until his retirement in 2000. Since then, he has served as Outaouais Herald of Arms Emeritus.

Auguste Vachon holds a master's degree in history from the University of Ottawa. He joined the National Archives of Canada in 1967 as keeper of heraldic collections. With the creation of the Canadian Heraldic Authority in 1988, he was appointed Saint-Laurent Herald and Registrar, a post he held until his retirement in 2000. The governor general of Canada then named him Outaouais Herald Emeritus. He has advanced the knowledge of Canadian emblems by numerous publications in Canada and abroad, as a speaker at several international congresses and by doing research for exhibitions in the field. The Canadian Museum of History has acquired the large collection of heraldic ceramics (more than 1100 pieces) assembled by him and his wife, Paula Gornescu-Vachon, a gift that the Canadian government declared to be of national importance.

== Coat of arms ==
Auguste Vachon was granted arms by the Canadian Heraldic Authority on May 28, 1992. The arms are blazoned:Sable a triple-towered Castle Or windows Gules portcullis shut Sable flaming Gules in chief two Suns Or, and for the crest Above a helmet mantled Sable doubled Or wreathed of these colours a demi bull Gules accorné unguled ringed gorged of oak leaves and belled all Or holding in its dexter hoof a magnifying glass proper rim and handle Sable.

On April 3, 2001 Vachon was granted supporters as an honourable augmentation to his arms in recognition of his distinguished service to Canadian heraldry: Upon a grassy mound set with gloriosa Daisies (Rudbeckia hirta) Or two Cardinals (Cardinalis cardinalis) proper.
