= Samy Khalid =

Canadian historian and herald

Samy Khalid PhD
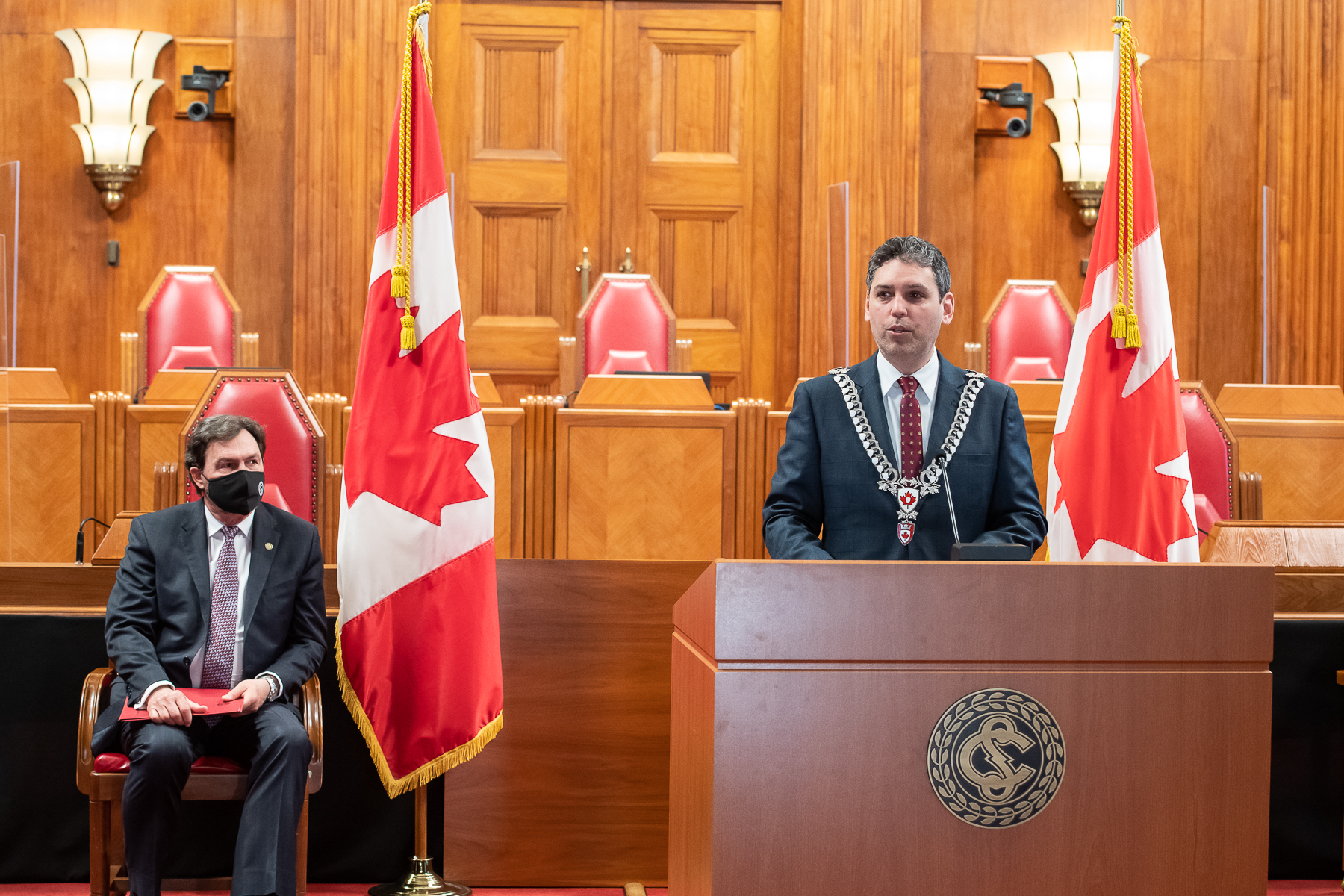
- Khalid in 2021, presenting new heraldic insignia for the Supreme Court of Canada

Chief Herald of Canada
- Incumbent
- Assumed office May 20, 2020
- Monarchs: Elizabeth II; Charles III
- Governors General: Julie Payette; Mary Simon; Louise Arbour
- Preceded by: Claire Boudreau

Personal details
- Education: University of Ottawa
- Occupation: Historian, herald

Samy Khalid is a Canadian historian and herald who is Chief Herald of Canada.

== Life and career ==
Khalid began his career as a freelance translator before working as a political assistant in the Prime Minister's Office. He then worked for provincial cultural and public affairs organizations, including as executive director of the Franco-Ontarian Heritage Consortium, and the Francophone Assembly of Ontario.

In 2009, Khalid earned a doctorate in history from the University of Ottawa. He joined the Canadian Heraldic Authority in 2014, as Saguenay Herald, and became assistant director in an acting capacity in 2019. Khalid also served as editor-in-chief of Le Chaînon from 2012 until the summer of 2020.

On May 20, 2020, Khalid was appointed as third Chief Herald of Canada.

On September 10, 2022, Khalid announced the proclamation of Charles III as King of Canada in a ceremony at Rideau Hall.

On May 6, 2023, the coronation of Charles III as King of Canada, Khalid unveiled the new Canadian Royal Crown, a heraldic symbol of the sovereign’s authority and the Canadian monarchy.

Heraldic offices
Preceded by Claire Boudreau	Chief Herald of Canada; 2020–present	Incumbent
