= International Congress of Genealogical and Heraldic Sciences =

- Frequency: biennial
- Inaugurated: 1929
- Most recent: 2024
- Next event: 2026
- Sponsor: International Academy of Genealogy & Heraldry
- Website: www.americanancestors.org

The International Congress of Genealogical and Heraldic Sciences is a biennial conference for topics of heraldic and genealogical interest. The Congress convenes scholars and other interested persons from Europe and throughout the world.

The first Congress was held at Barcelona in 1929; at the second Congress, held in 1953, it was decided that future meetings would be held every two years (there being two exceptions).

The 22nd Congress at Ottawa in 1996 was memorable '"for the first time beyond the birthplace of modern scientific studies in genealogy and heraldry"' with HE the Rt Hon. Roméo LeBlanc, Governor General of Canada and his wife Dr Diana Fowler LeBlanc as patrons. The 2006 Congress at St Andrews, had HRH The Princess Royal as its patron, and HE the Rt Hon. Michaëlle Jean was patron of the 2008 Congress at Quebec City.

The main themes of the Congresses have changed greatly over the years, and some disciplines have ceased to form any part of the Congress' study. Abandoned subjects include sphragistics and iconography, which were dealt with at Paris, and vexillology, which was to have been one of the themes at Congresses after Bern. Genetics, which had been a subject of discussion at Stockholm in 1960, did not reappear until the Ottawa Congress of 1996. Chivalric orders were another discarded subject, despite featuring in the Congresses held at Rome/Naples, Madrid, Stockholm and Edinburgh, as well as in a few papers presented at Madrid in 1982.

== List of Congresses ==
The Congress rotates being hosted in different countries:

Nr	City	Year	Dates	Patron	Theme
I	Barcelona	1929		HM King Alfonso XIII of Spain	
II	Rome/Naples	1953	23-25 September	Prince Ranieri, Duke of Castro	
III	Madrid	1955	6-11 October	Infante Juan, Count of Barcelona	
IV	Brussels	1958		HM King Baudoin of the Belgians	
V	Stockholm	1960	21-28 August	HRH Prince Bertil, Duke of Halland	
VI	Edinburgh	1962	8-14 September	HRH The Duke of Edinburgh	
VII	The Hague	1964	20-26 June	HM Queen Juliana of the Netherlands	
VIII	Paris	1966		Charles de Gaulle	
IX	Bern	1968	30 June-6 July	King Umberto II of Italy	
X	Vienna	1970		Prince Karl von Schwarzenberg	
XI	Liège	1972	29 May-3 June	HM King Baudoin of the Belgians	
XII	Munich	1974		HSH The Prince of Lippe	
XIII	London	1976		HRH Princess Anne	
XIV	Copenhagen	1980	25-29 August	HM Queen Margrethe II of Denmark	
XV	Madrid	1982	19-25 September	HM King Juan Carlos of Spain	
XVI	Helsinki	1984	16-21 August	Grand Duke Vladimir Kirillovich of Russia	
XVII	Lisbon	1986	7-13 September	Duarte Pio, Duke of Braganza	
XVIII	Innsbruck	1988	5-9 September	Archduke Otto of Austria	
XIX	Keszthely	1990	2-6 October	HI&RH Archduke Andreas Salvator of Austria	
XX	Uppsala	1992	9-13 August	HM King Carl XVI Gustaf of Sweden	
XXI	Luxembourg	1994	28 August-3 September	HRH The Grand Duke of Luxembourg	
XXII	Ottawa	1996	18-23 August	HE The Rt Hon. Roméo LeBlanc & Dr Diana Fowler LeBlanc	Families and Symbols Transcending Frontiers
XXIII	Turin	1998	21-26 September	HE Dott. Ugo Barzini	
XXIV	Besançon	2000	2-7 May	Henri, Count of Paris	
XXV	Dublin	2002	16-21 September	Professor Mary McAleese	Genealogy and Heraldry: Their Place and Practice in Changing Times
XXVI	Bruges	2004	6-11 September	HM King Albert II of the Belgians	
XXVII	St Andrews	2006	21-26 August	HRH The Princess Royal	Myth and propaganda in heraldry and genealogy
XXVIII	Quebec	2008	23-27 June	HE The Rt Hon. Michaëlle Jean	The Meeting of Two Worlds, Quest or Conquest
XXIX	Stuttgart	2010	12-17 September	Georg Friedrich Prinz von Preussen	Identity in Genealogy and Heraldry
XXX	Maastricht	2012	24-28 September	HRH The Prince of Orange	Frontiers in Genealogy and Heraldry
XXXI	Oslo	2014	13-17 August	HM King Harald V of Norway	Influence on Genealogy and Heraldry of Major Events in the History of a Nation
XXXII	Glasgow	2016	10-14 August	Dr Joseph Morrow, Lord Lyon	Origins and Evolution
XXXIII	Arras	2018	2-5 October	HSH Albert II, Prince of Monaco	Genealogy and Heraldry, between War and Peace
XXXIV	Madrid	2020	20-23 October	HM King Felipe VI of Spain	
XXXV	Cambridge	2022	15-19 August	HRH Prince Edward, Earl of Wessex	Reformation, Revolution, Restoration
XXXVI	Boston	2024	24-28 September	Brady Brim-DeForest, Baron of Balvaird	Origins, Journeys, Destinations
XXXVII	San Marino	2027	06-10 April	HE The Captain Regent of San Marino	
