= Royal Heraldry Society of Canada =

Non-profit organization with royal patronage

- Arms of the Royal Heraldry Society of Canada
- Abbreviation: RHSC
- Formation: 1966
- Type: non-profit organization with royal patronage
- Purpose: study and promotion of heraldry
- Headquarters: Ottawa, Ontario, Canada
- Members: 325 (2019)
- Official language: English, French
- Patron: Mary May Simon, CC CMM COM OQ CD
- Vice Patron: Beverley McLachlin, PC, CC
- President: Capt. Ian C. Steingaszner, CD, FRHSC (Hon)
- Secretary: Stephen R.A. Murray, FRHSC (Hon), CPPA, BA
- Website: heraldry.ca

The Royal Heraldry Society of Canada (RHSC; French: Société royale héraldique du Canada) is a Canadian organization that promotes interest in heraldry in Canada. It was founded in 1966 and granted royal patronage in 2002.

== History ==
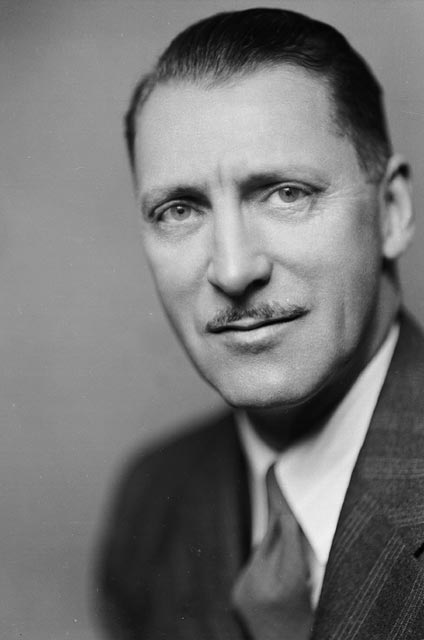
Alan Beddoe, founding president of the society

The society was established in October 1966, as the Heraldry Society of Canada, by a group of heraldic enthusiasts from Ottawa under the leadership of Alan Beddoe. The organizing meeting occurred at Ottawa's Beacon Arms Hotel.

In 2002, royal patronage was extended to the society, and its name changed to the Royal Heraldry Society of Canada. The designation was officially proclaimed at the society's annual meeting in Victoria, British Columbia on October 22 of that year by the Lieutenant Governor of British Columbia, Iona Campagnolo. The arms of the society were accordingly augmented in December 2002 with the addition of the Royal Crown to the supporters.

The society is notable for being one of the few organizations in Canada to make use of a ceremonial mace. The society's mace is fashioned from pewter and wood, and inscribed with heraldic symbols.

== Activities ==
The society has six regional branches, which sponsor periodic talks and lectures on the topic of heraldry: British Columbia / Yukon, Laurentian (Montreal), Ottawa Valley, Prairie, and Toronto. It publishes a biannual journal, Heraldry in Canada, a quarterly newsletter, Gonfanon, and has published the reference books Canadian Heraldry (1981) and A Canadian Heraldic Primer (2001).

The society has underwritten the cost of displaying the arms of the Governors General of Canada at Ottawa's Church of St. Bartholomew, sponsored the diamond jubilee display of the Queen's Beasts at the Canadian Museum of History, financed the design and acquisition of the tabard of the Chief Herald of Canada, assisted in the restoration of the heraldic installations at Hart House at the University of Toronto, and actively liaisons with provincial and municipal governments for "the protection and proper use of heraldry".

=== Distinctions ===
The society grants three distinctions, each carrying post-nominal letters: Fellow of the Royal Heraldry Society of Canada (FRHSC), Honorary Fellow of the Royal Heraldry Society of Canada (FRHSC, Hon.), and Licentiate of the Royal Heraldry Society of Canada (LRHSC). Notable persons having been granted society distinctions include:

- Bruce W. Beatty
- Graham Anderson
- D'Arcy Boulton
- Bruce Patterson
- Conrad Swan
- Robert Watt
- Auguste Vachon
- Charles Maier
- Christopher McCreery
- John Matheson
- Darrel Kennedy
- Claire Boudreau
- Cathy Bursey-Sabourin

== Arms of the society ==
The society's arms were granted by the Canadian Crown and registered by the Canadian Heraldic Authority:

Shield
Quarterly per fess embattled Gules and Argent, in the first quarter an inescutcheon Argent charged with a maple leaf Gules;
Crest
Issuant from maple leaves Gules, a demi lion Or holding a staff proper flying therefrom a banner of the Arms fringed Or;
Supporters
Dexter a beaver sejant Or collared Gules pendent therefrom a torteau bearing the Royal Crown proper, sinister a narwhal haurient Argent armed Or charged on the shoulder with a torteau bearing the Royal Crown proper, the whole set upon a compartment per pale of a grassy mound and waves proper;
Motto
ET PATRIBUS ET POSTERITATI ("For ancestors and posterity")

== See also ==
- List of Canadian organizations with royal prefix
- The Heraldry Society
- Committee on Heraldry of the New England Historic Genealogical Society
