= List of people educated at Bolton School =

Former pupils of Bolton School are known as Old Boltonians.

The Old Girls' Association and Old Boltonians' Associations are active with over 9,000 members and nationwide reunions throughout the year. Notable alumni include:

== A ==
- Mark Addis (born 1969), professor of philosophy
- Monica Ali (born 1967), author
- Huda Ammori (born 1994), Palestine Action co-founder
- Bryan Appleyard (born 1951), journalist and author

== B ==
- Jack Bond (1932–2019), cricketer
- James Booth (1914–2000), judge, Liberal Party politician
- Geoffrey W. Bromiley (1915–2009), ecclesiastical historian

== C ==
- Andrew "Chubby" Chandler (born 1953), sports manager
- Donald Geoffrey Charlton (1925–1995), Professor of French at the University of Warwick
- Jennifer Clack (née Agnew, 1947–2020), academic; professor and curator of Vertebrate Paleontology at the University of Cambridge
- Gordon Clough (1934–1996), broadcaster
- Sir Philip Craven (born 1950), President of the International Paralympic Committee
- Clive Crook (born 1955), journalist for the Financial Times

== D ==
- Julian Darby (born 1967), former Premier League footballer
- Alex Davidson (born 1992), Salford City Reds rugby league player
- Roger Draper, chief executive of the Lawn Tennis Association and formerly chief executive of Sport England
- Jill Duff (born 1972), Anglican priest and Bishop of Lancaster

== E ==
- Chris Eatough (born 1974), world champion mountain biker
- Sir William Edge, 1st Baronet (1880–1948), politician
- Major Sir Cyril Entwistle (1887–1974), politician

== G ==
- Max George (born 1988), singer in the boy band The Wanted
- Chris Goudge (1935–2010), Olympic hurdler

== H ==
- Leslie Halliwell (1929–1989), film writer and historian
- Haseeb Hameed (born 1997), Lancashire, Nottinghamshire and England cricketer
- John Hanscomb (1924–2019), Conservative politician, former Mayor of Bolton
- Robert Haslam, Baron Haslam (1923–2002), former Chair of British Steel and the Coal Board
- Oliver Heywood (1630–1702), nonconformist minister
- John Hick (1815–1894), Conservative Party MP
- Jonathan L. Howard, author

== J ==
- Sir Geoffrey Jackson (1915–1987), British Ambassador to Uruguay

== K ==
- Carol Klein (born 1945), gardening expert, TV presenter and newspaper columnist
- Sir Harry Kroto (1939–2016), 1996 Nobel Prize in Chemistry

== L ==
- Ralf Little (born 1980), actor
- Kate Long (born 1964), author

== M ==
- Sir Ian McKellen (born 1939), actor
- Sarah Mercer (born 1969), linguist
- Patricia Morris, Baroness Morris of Bolton (born 1954), Conservative politician and first Chancellor of the University of Bolton

== P ==
- Callum Parkinson (born 1996), Leicestershire cricketer
- Matt Parkinson (born 1996), Lancashire and England cricketer
- Andy Paterson, film producer and former second unit director
- Norah Lillian Penston (1903–1974), Principal of Bedford College, University of London
- Nathaniel Phillips (born 1997), Liverpool FC footballer

== R ==
- Mark Radcliffe (born 1958), radio broadcaster
- John Ratledge (born 1974), first-class cricketer
- John Roberts (born 1973), founder of AO World
- Barbara Ronson (1942–2018), Liberal Democrat politician
- Sir Arthur Rostron (1869–1940), Captain of the RMS Carpathia
- David Ruffley (born 1962), Conservative politician
- Sir Ernest Ryder (born 1957), Lord Justice of Appeal (Court of Appeal) and Senior President of Tribunals; former Chancellor at the University of Bolton (2014–2016)

== S ==
- David Sandiford (born 1970), cricketer and barrister
- Nigel Short (born 1965), chess player
- Becky Smethurst, astrophysicist
- Barry Smith (born 1952), ontologist
- Gerard Corley Smith (1909–1997), diplomat, environmentalist
- Dame Janet Smith (born 1940), judge
- Peter Smith, Baron Smith of Leigh (born 1945), Labour politician and Life Peer
- Malcolm Stevens (born 1938), chemist
- Edmund Clifton Stoner (1899–1968), theoretical physicist
- Marcus Sheff (born 1963), non-profit chief executive officer (CEO), former media executive and journalist

== T ==
- Ann Taylor, Baroness Taylor of Bolton (born 1947), Labour politician
- Davinia Taylor (née Murphy, born 1977), actress and socialite
- Archis Tiku (born 1977), former bassist with the band Maxïmo Park
- Joyce Tyldesley (born 1960), Egyptologist

== W ==
- Paul Wheatcroft (born 1980), footballer
- Mark Williams (born 1978), Informator Choristarum of Magdalen College, Oxford, formerly Director of Music at Jesus College, Cambridge and Assistant Organist of St Paul's Cathedral
- Alfred Woodhall (1897–1968), senior officer in the Royal Air Force during the Second World War
