= Baron and feme =

Couple considered as one person

In English law, baron and feme is a phrase used for husband and wife, in relation to each other, who were accounted as one person by coverture. Hence, by the old law of evidence, the one party was excluded from giving evidence for or against the other in civil questions, and a relic of this is still preserved in criminal law.

== Heraldry ==
In heraldry, baron and femme are terms denoting the two-halves of an heraldic escutcheon used when the coat of arms of a man and the paternal arms of his wife are impaled (or anciently dimidiated), that is borne per pale within the same escutcheon. The position of the husband's arms, on the dexter side (to viewer's left), the position of honour, is referred to as baron whilst the paternal arms of the wife are shown in sinister, referred to as femme. The resultant shield is used by the husband, as in general females are not entitled to display heraldry, unless suo jure peeresses. This is the normal way of displaying the arms of a married man. Impalement is not used when the wife is an heraldic heiress, in which case her paternal arms are displayed on an inescutcheon of pretence within her husbands' arms, denoting that the husband is a pretender to the paternal arms of his wife, and that they will be quartered by the couple's issue and later descendants. Where arms are impaled for reasons other than conjugal marriage, for example the spiritual marriage of a bishop to his see or the mystical marriage of King Richard II to Saint Edward the Confessor, the halves of the shield are referred to as simply dexter and sinister.

== Etymology ==
In Late Latin barō, barōnis, meant man (a borrowing from Frankish *barō). Later, in Western Europe, the word was used to refer to a ruler's leading henchmen (e.g. a baron was the King's Man). Later, it came to have a specific, legal definition as the tenant-in-chief of the early Norman kings, which class developed into feudal barons who held their lands from the king by the feudal tenure per baroniam and were entitled to attend parliament. The Norman-French word feme/femme simply denotes "woman" or "wife".

== See also ==
- Feme sole
- Women in heraldry
