= Denys Campion Potts =

- Born: 17 March 1923
- Died: 11 May 2016 (aged 93)
- Education: St John's School, Leatherhead
- Alma mater: Brasenose College, Oxford
- Occupation: Academic

Denys Campion Potts (17 March 1923 – 11 May 2016) was a scholar and authority on French literature. His obituary in The Daily Telegraph stated that he ‘shared with the authors he studied their belief in reason as well as their penchant for irony’.

== Early life ==
Denys Campion Potts was born in Salford on 17 March 1923, the only child of Frank Potts, a Church of England clergyman, and his wife Constance, whose maiden name was Campion. They had married at Saddleworth in 1919, soon after Frank Potts had been licensed as stipendiary curate at Christ Church, Blackburn. During the First World War, he had served as a forces’ chaplain in British India. In November 1927, when Potts was aged four, his parents left St Mary's Vicarage, Greenfield, near Oldham, and took him to Mombasa on the SS Matiana, on the way to settle in Uganda, where his father became a missionary. In 1931, the Potts family returned to England for Frank Potts to take up the benefice of Ruddington, Nottinghamshire, where he died in post in 1951.

Potts was educated at St John's School, Leatherhead, which then had the main purpose of educating the sons of poor clergymen. There, he was strong in mathematics and was introduced to classical music, a lasting pleasure in his life. From 1941 he read mathematics at Brasenose College, Oxford, and remained at the university to complete his degree, graduating in 1944.

== Career ==
On the recommendation of C. P. Snow, after his graduation Potts was recruited by Rolls-Royce Limited for war service, working in applied mathematics. He was not convinced that industry or mathematics were attractive career paths, so in 1947 he returned to Brasenose to read for a degree in Modern Languages, having taken a crammer in French. His interview for the course was conducted by Robert Shackleton in a Paris café. Potts subsequently completed his Modern Languages degree in two years, graduating with a First in 1949, and immediately began work for a doctorate as a Senior Hulme Scholar, spending a year as a lecturer at the École Normale Supérieure in Paris.

Potts's doctoral thesis was on the work of Charles de Saint-Évremond, and later his specialism became the French Age of Enlightenment. Having gained his doctorate, Potts became a Besse Fellow at Keble College, Oxford, where he focussed on French authors of the 17th and 18th centuries. Unusually, at the time, he also lectured on 20th-century French poetry and the Nouveau roman. He wrote French Thought Since 1600 with D. G. Charlton.

Potts remained at Keble until his retirement in 1989, having served as Dean and Sub-Warden at the college. He was also a visiting professor at the University of Michigan.

Potts retained a lifelong interest in classical music and in 1950 he befriended the French composer Joseph Canteloube, and was present at the first recording of Chants d'Auvergne. At Oxford he was President of the Gramophone Society. After he retired, Potts travelled with his wife and enjoyed his love of opera. His enduring interest in Charles de Saint-Évremond led him to edit a further book of the essayist's letters.

== Private life ==
Potts married Doraine Truscott, and they had two sons and two daughters.

His father having died in 1951, Potts’s mother, Constance Potts, joined him in Oxford and died there in April 1976, aged 84.

== Selected bibliography ==
- Saint Évremond and Seventeenth-Century Libertinage, by Denys Campion Potts. Ph. D. published by the University of Oxford, 1962
- French Thought Since 1600, by Denys Campion Potts and D.G. Charlton. Published by Methuen, London, 1974
- Bayle, by Elisabeth Labrousse and Denys Campion Potts. Published by Oxford University Press, 1983
- Eluard: Capitale de la Douleur : A Selection of Critical Articles, ed. by Denys Campion Potts. Xerox copy of a selection of articles [some in French, others in English] by twelve authors on the subject of Paul Éluard's poetry, taken from various publications and bound as a monograph by Keble College library, compiled by D. C. Potts (undated).
