= Mary Matthew (heraldry) =

English heraldry recipient (c. 1516–1602)

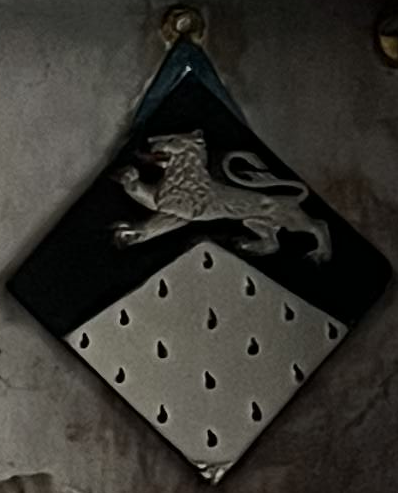
- Coat of Arms
- Born: c. 1516; Colchester, Essex, England
- Died: 1602; Latton, Essex, England
- Known for: the first woman in England to be granted her own coat of arms
- Spouse: Andrew Judde (m. 1552, died 1558)
- Children: 6

Mary Matthew (c. 1516–1602) was a 16th-century Englishwoman who was the first woman in England to be granted her own coat of arms.

== Biography ==
Matthew was born about 1516 in Colchester, Essex. Her father was Thomas Matthew of Colchester. Her mother, a daughter of John Bardefeld, had first married Thomas Wesden of Lincolnshire and later married Mathew's father.

By 1540, Matthew was married to Thomas Langton, citizen and skinner of London. They had five children. After her husband's death, she remarried in 1552 to Andrew Judde, a merchant and Lord Mayor of London, and they had a daughter. Judde died in 1558.

Matthew became the first woman to be granted her own coat of arms in 1558. Heraldry was traditionally "a masculine practice" and "there are far more examples of women using their father’s or husband’s arms than being granted their own."

Matthew died in 1602 in Latton, Essex.

== See also ==
- Women in heraldry
