= Armiger =

Person entitled to bear a coat of arms

In heraldry, an armiger is a (natural or juridical) person entitled to use a heraldic achievement (e.g., bear arms, an "armour-bearer") either by hereditary right, grant, matriculation, or assumption of arms. Such a person is said to be armigerous; the term has also been informally applied to clans and families. In Scotland, however, heraldic authorities including the Lord Lyon King of Arms and the Standing Council of Scottish Chiefs have noted that, properly speaking, arms belong to individual armigers rather than to a clan or family collectively.

== Etymology ==
The Latin word armiger literally means "arms-bearer". In high and late medieval England, the word referred to an esquire attendant upon a knight, but bearing his own unique armorial device.

Armiger was also used as a Latin cognomen, and is now found as a rare surname in English-speaking countries.

=== Overuse ===
By the end of the 16th century, the pretentious use of armiger as a quasi-title was being mocked by Shakespeare in his character Robert Shallow, a justice of the peace:

...a gentleman born, master parson; who writes himself "Armigero," in any bill, warrant, quittance, or obligation, "Armigero."

To which Shallow directly replies:

Ay, that I do; and have done any time these three hundred years.

— William Shakespeare, The Merry Wives of Windsor, Act I, Scene I

== Modern period ==
Today, the term armiger is well-defined only within jurisdictions, such as Canada, the Republic of Ireland, Kenya, South Africa, Malta, Spain, and the United Kingdom, where heraldry is regulated by the state or a heraldic body, such as the College of Arms, the Chief Herald of Canada, the Court of the Lord Lyon or the Office of the Chief Herald of Ireland. A person can be so entitled either by proven (and typically agnatic) descent from a person with a right to bear a heraldic achievement, or by virtue of a grant of arms to himself. Merely sharing the same family name of an armiger is insufficient. British armigers are considered gentlemen and equated to untitled nobility by organisations such as the CILANE and the Order of Malta, a grant of arms confirms or confers such gentle (untitled noble) status. This is not the case for Continental armigers, who may bear noble or merely burgher arms with the latter according no social precedence.

The usage of a heraldic achievement is usually governed by legal restrictions; these restrictions are independent of the copyright status and independent of a coat of arms depiction. A coat of arms represents its owner. Though it can be freely represented, it cannot be appropriated, or used in such a way as to create a confusion with or a prejudice to its owner.

In the Netherlands, only the heraldry of noble families is regulated.

In Sweden and Finland the nobility has had, since 1762, the prerogative to use an open helmet, while others use a closed helmet. In Britain, the untitled nobility uses closed helmets.

In the Spanish nobility, armígero was a low specific rank to which a certain group of untitled nobles were entitled. In modern heraldry, the term blasonado is also used.

== See also ==
- Armigerous clan
- Heraldic achievement – Full display of coat of arms
- Heraldry – Discipline of the design and study of coats of arms
- Law of heraldic arms – Law governing possession and use of arms
- Women in heraldry
