= John Angus Hickman =

British-French cancer pharmacologist

John Angus Hickman (born 10 September 1945) is a British-French cancer pharmacologist. He was ICI Professor of Molecular Pharmacology at the University of Manchester, worked at Aston University on the anticancer drug temozolomide, and later headed a cancer drug discovery group at the pharmaceutical company Servier in Paris.

== Career ==
Hickman was an academic at Aston University, where Malcolm Stevens led a drug discovery laboratory whose work, funded by the Cancer Research Campaign (now Cancer Research UK), led to the brain cancer drug temozolomide (marketed as Temodal). Together with Andreas Gescher and Neil Gibson, he showed that mitozolomide, the compound that preceded temozolomide, was effective in most of the mouse tumour models then in use. He is a co-author of the 1987 paper that reported the antitumour activity and pharmacokinetics of temozolomide in mice. He received a Doctor of Science (DSc) in 1990 for his work in experimental cancer chemotherapy.

In 1982 he spent 18 months in the Department of Pharmacology at Yale University, where with Thomas R. Tritton he suggested that cell membrane signalling could be a target for anticancer drugs. In 1989 he co-organised the first American Association for Cancer Research special meeting held outside the United States, in Cambridge, UK, on anticancer drugs targeting cell signalling.

He moved to the School of Biological Sciences at the University of Manchester in 1989 as the Imperial Chemical Industries (ICI) Professor of Molecular Pharmacology, where he directed a research group investigating the role of apoptosis in cancer drug sensitivity and resistance. He initiated and directed a joint laboratory between ICI Pharmaceuticals (which became Zeneca) and the School of Biological Sciences. He became head of the Division of Physiology, Pharmacology and Toxicology in the School and was a co-founder of the Manchester University Biotechnology Incubator.

After short sabbaticals at Northwestern University in Evanston and the University of Oxford, and two summers at the Woods Hole Marine Biology Laboratory, Hickman left Manchester for Paris in 1999 to head a new cancer drug discovery group at Servier. The group's work focused on drugs that inhibit the anti-apoptotic proteins BCL-2 and MCL-1.

After retiring in 2010, he coordinated PREDECT, a European Union Innovative Medicines Initiative project on preclinical models that better represent the complexity of cancer. He has since written about the limits of personalised cancer medicine, the predictive validity of preclinical models in drug discovery, and European Union policy on personalised cancer medicine. He works with the group Consilium Scientific.

== Research work ==
Hickman's work includes the proposal in the early 1980s that cell signalling could be a target for anticancer drugs and, in the 1990s, studies of the role of apoptosis (cell death) in determining whether cancer cells are sensitive or resistant to anticancer drugs. At Servier he was a co-author of papers describing the MCL-1 inhibitor S63845 and the BCL-2 inhibitor S55746. His publications have been cited more than 20,000 times, and his h-index in Google Scholar is 68.

== Books ==
- Apoptosis and cancer chemotherapy. Totowa, N.J.: Humana Press. 1999. ISBN 9780896037434.
- Cancer chemotherapy. Oxford: Blackwell Scientific Publications. 1993. ISBN 9780632034413.
