= Jack Draper =

British tennis player (born 2001)

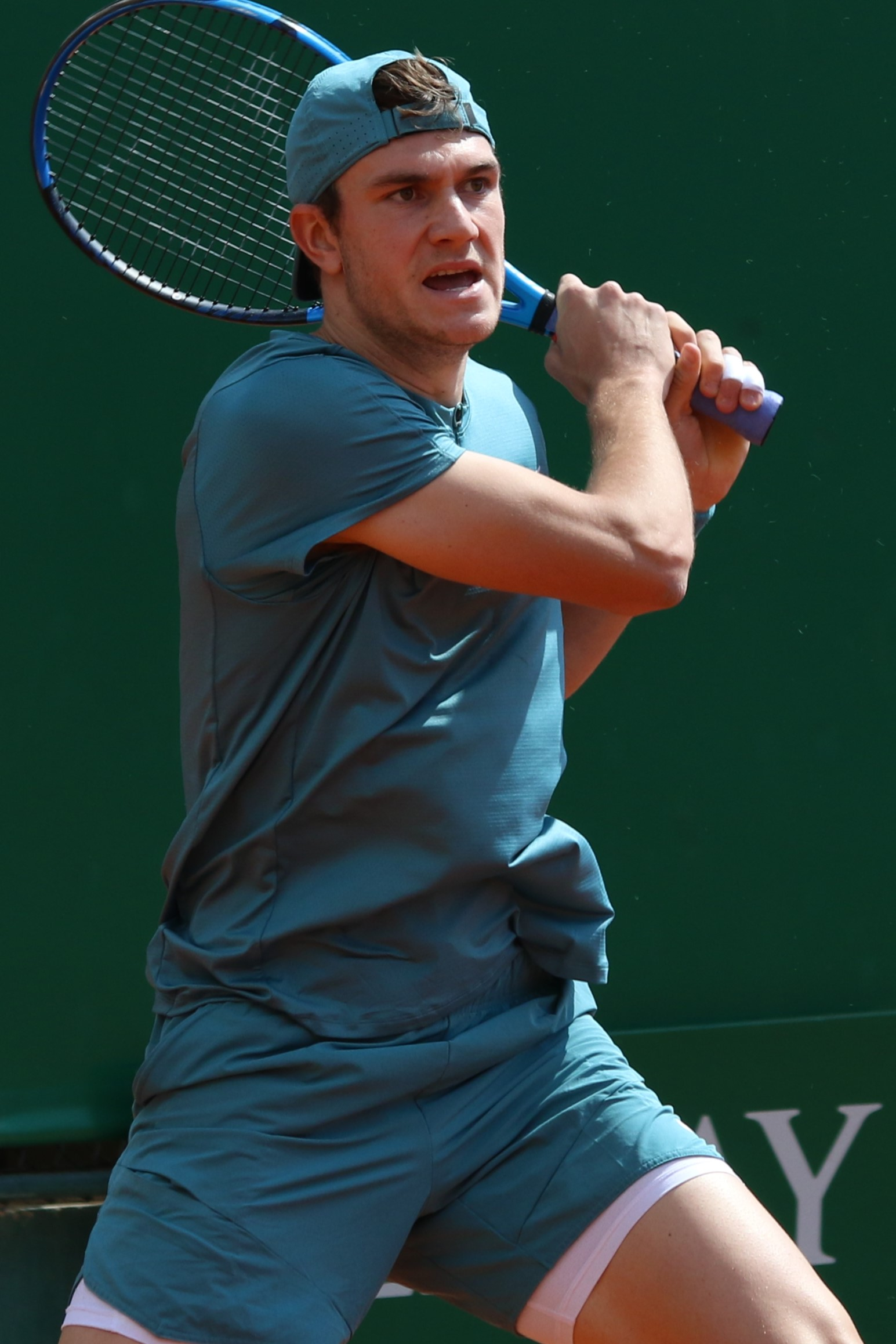
- Draper at the 2023 Monte-Carlo Masters
- Country (sports): (United Kingdom) Great Britain
- Residence: London, England, UK
- Born: 22 December 2001 (age 24) London, England, UK
- Height: 1.93 m (6 ft 4 in)
- Turned pro: 2018
- Plays: Left-handed (two-handed backhand)
- Coach: Andy Murray (June 2026–)
- Prize money: US$8,443,805

Singles
- Career record: 110–60
- Career titles: 3
- Highest ranking: No. 4 (9 June 2025)
- Current ranking: No. 155 (16 November 2026)

Grand Slam singles results
- Australian Open: 4R (2025)
- French Open: 4R (2025)
- Wimbledon: 2R (2022, 2024, 2025)
- US Open: SF (2024)

Other tournaments
- Olympic Games: 2R (2024)

Doubles
- Career record: 6–4
- Career titles: 0
- Highest ranking: No. 202 (14 July 2025)
- Current ranking: No. 577 (2 February 2026)

Grand Slam doubles results
- Wimbledon: 1R (2019)

Grand Slam mixed doubles results
- US Open: SF (2025)
- Last updated on: 23 November 2026.

Jack Alexander Draper (born 22 December 2001) is a British professional tennis player. He has a career-high ATP singles ranking of world No. 4, achieved on 9 June 2025. He is currently the No. 6 singles player from Great Britain.

Draper has won three titles on the ATP Tour, including an ATP Masters 1000 event in Indian Wells and reached the semifinals at the US Open. He has also won five titles on the ATP Challenger Tour and seven on the ITF Tour. As a junior, Draper was the runner-up at the 2018 Wimbledon Championships, ending the year at his peak junior ranking of world No. 7.

== Early life ==
Draper was born in Sutton, London and brought up in nearby Ashtead, Surrey. His father is Roger Draper, former chief executive of Sport England and the Lawn Tennis Association, and his mother is Nicky Draper, a former junior British tennis champion. Draper attended Parkside School in Stoke d’Abernon, Cobham, from age four to eleven, while being coached by Justin Sherring. He then attended Reed's School, Cobham for two years.

== Juniors ==
Draper reached his first and only junior Grand Slam final at the 2018 Wimbledon Championships, where he lost to Tseng Chun-hsin in three sets. He closed the year at a career-high junior ranking of No. 7.

== Professional career ==
=== 2021: ATP, Masters and top 250 debut ===
Plagued by injuries for most of his career, Draper made his ATP Tour main draw debut in singles as a wildcard at the Miami Open. He had to retire in his first-round match against Mikhail Kukushkin, after he collapsed on the court from heat-related illness.

At the Queen's Club Championships in June, Draper secured the biggest win of his career to date with a victory over world No. 23 Jannik Sinner as a wildcard. He defeated world No. 39 Alexander Bublik in the round of 16 to reach the quarterfinals of an ATP tournament for the first time in his career, where he lost to eventual finalist Cameron Norrie. By reaching this stage of the tournament, he became the youngest British ATP quarterfinalist since Andy Murray in 2006 and earned a top 250 debut in the ATP rankings.

Draper received a wildcard into the singles main draw at the Wimbledon Championships. He drew defending champion Novak Djokovic in the first round, where he claimed the first set 6–4 before losing the next three sets to lose the match.

=== 2022: Masters quarterfinal, top 10 win, top 50 ===
In January, Draper entered the 2022 Città di Forlì II, an ATP Challenger Tour event, in Forlì, where he was the eighth seed. There, he reached his first Challenger final and won his first title on the tour after defeating compatriot Jay Clarke in two sets. Two weeks later, Draper continued his run of form at the Città di Forlì IV, where he was unseeded and reached his second final to claim his second Challenger title after defeating Tim van Rijthoven. The win led Draper to debut in the top 200 and reach a new career high of world No. 162 on 21 February 2022. Draper secured his third consecutive Challenger title in his third Forlì tournament at Città di Forlì V the following week after saving four match points in the final to defeat Alexander Ritschard in three sets.

At the Miami Open, Draper clinched his first Masters 1000 match win over Gilles Simon as a wildcard. He lost in the second round to compatriot Cameron Norrie. The following week, Draper went on to win his fourth Challenger title at Saint-Brieuc, defeating Zizou Bergs in the final. At the 2022 Mutua Madrid Open, on his debut, he defeated world No. 27 Lorenzo Sonego as a wildcard for his second win at the Masters level. Draper made his top 100 debut at world No. 99 on 13 June 2022.

At Eastbourne, as a wildcard, Draper beat Jenson Brooksby, fourth seed Diego Schwartzman and fellow wildcard Ryan Peniston to reach the first ATP semifinal of his career. He lost in three sets to Maxime Cressy in the semifinals. He earned a direct entry at a major tournament for the first time at the 2022 Wimbledon Championships and won his first Grand Slam match defeating wildcard Zizou Bergs.

Draper qualified for the Canadian Open in Montreal, where, after beating Hugo Gaston in the first round, upset third seed and world No. 5 Stefanos Tsitsipas in straight sets in the second round for his first top-10 win. It was his first third-round showing in his career at a Masters 1000 level. After Gaël Monfils, his third-round opponent, retired due to injury, Draper advanced to his first Masters 1000 quarterfinal. He lost to Pablo Carreño Busta in straight sets, who was the eventual champion.

At the 2022 Winston-Salem Open he defeated Fabio Fognini in the second round. Next he defeated former No. 3 and wildcard Dominic Thiem to reach the quarterfinals, where he lost to qualifier Marc-Andrea Hüsler in straight sets. At the US Open he reached the third round of a Major for the first time in his career defeating sixth seed and world No. 8 Félix Auger-Aliassime in straight sets. In the fourth round he retired against Karen Khachanov at one set all.

On 19 October, he qualified for the 2022 Next Generation ATP Finals, the first Briton to do so. On 24 October he reached his career-high singles ranking of world No. 45 having reached the top 50 two weeks earlier. At the NextGen Finals he reached the semifinals defeating top seed Lorenzo Musetti in the group stage. He lost in the last four to Brandon Nakashima.

=== 2023: Two Major debuts, first ATP final, injuries ===
Draper started his 2023 season at the Adelaide International 1. He lost in the second round to eighth seed and world No. 20, Karen Khachanov. At the Adelaide International 2, he beat eighth seed Tommy Paul in the second round. He then got revenge on third seed and world No. 20, Karen Khachanov, defeating him in the quarterfinals to reach his second ATP semifinal. Despite having beaten him the previous week, he lost his semifinal match to the eventual champion, Kwon Soon-woo, in a tight three-setter.

Making his debut at the Australian Open, he fell in the first round to top seed, world No. 2, 2009 champion, and defending champion, Rafael Nadal, in four sets while struggling with cramps. He reached a career-high singles ranking of No. 38 on 16 January 2023.

Draper returned to action in March by playing at the Indian Wells Open. In his debut at this tournament, he defeated 24th seed, world No. 29, and compatriot, Dan Evans in the second round. In the third round, he beat 2009 finalist, former world No. 1 and compatriot, Andy Murray, in straight sets. He was forced to retire from his fourth round match against top seed, world No. 2, and eventual champion, Carlos Alcaraz, due to an abdominal muscle injury. Draper withdrew from the Miami Open due to the fact that he did not want to make his abdominal injury any worse.

Draper made his debut at the French Open but was forced to retire from his first round match against Tomás Martín Etcheverry due to a shoulder injury. As a result, he announced on 8 June that he would miss the entire grass season.

Draper made his return to the ATP Tour during the US Open where he defeated Radu Albot, 17th seed Hubert Hurkacz and Michael Mmoh to advance to the second week. He was eventually defeated by Andrey Rublev in the fourth round. He reached the Challenger final of the Open d'Orléans and returned to the top 100 on 2 October 2023. In November, he won his fifth Challenger title, the 2023 Trofeo Faip–Perrel.

Ranked No. 82 at the next tournament, the Sofia Open, he reached his second semifinal of the season defeating top seed Lorenzo Musetti and qualifier Cem Ilkel. He reached his first career final defeating Jan-Lennard Struff. He became the youngest Briton to reach an ATP Tour final since Andy Murray in 2009 Miami. Draper lost the final in three sets to Adrian Mannarino.

=== 2024: Two titles, Grand Slam semifinal, Olympics ===
Draper reached his second final at the Adelaide International defeating eighth seed Alexander Bublik. He lost to seventh seed Jiří Lehečka in three sets. He reached the semifinals at an ATP 500 event for the first time at the Mexican Open in Acapulco defeating sixth seed Tommy Paul, lucky loser Yoshihito Nishioka and Miomir Kecmanović. He retired against defending champion and third seed Alex de Minaur. As a result, he moved to a new career-high of No. 37 on 4 March 2024.

At the French Open, Draper lost in the first round to qualifier Jesper de Jong in five sets.

Draper reached his third career final at the Stuttgart Open, defeating three Americans en route, Marcos Giron, defending champion and fourth seed Frances Tiafoe and Brandon Nakashima. Draper beat Matteo Berrettini in the final to lift his maiden title, making him the eighth first-time ATP Tour champion for 2024. Draper became the British men's No. 1 and moved to a career-high No. 31 in the ATP rankings on 17 June 2024. At the next grass court tournament at Queen's Club the following week, he reached back-to-back quarterfinals defeating Mariano Navone and top seed and defending champion Carlos Alcaraz, in straight sets. As a result, he reached the top 30 in the rankings. He lost in the last eight to fifth seed Tommy Paul. At Wimbledon, Draper defeated Swedish qualifier Elias Ymer in five sets in the first round but lost his next match to compatriot Cameron Norrie.

On 15 July, he was named to the Great Britain squad for the Davis Cup group stage to be held in Manchester in September. At the 2024 Summer Olympics in Paris, Draper defeated Kei Nishikori in the first round, before losing to seventh seed Taylor Fritz in three sets. At the Cincinnati Open he reached the round of 16 for the first time at the tournament, with an upset over ninth seed Stefanos Tsitsipas. He then defeated Félix Auger-Aliassime in three sets, before losing to 15th seed Holger Rune.

At the US Open Draper overcame Zhang Zhizhen by retirement in the third set, Facundo Díaz Acosta, Botic van de Zandschulp and Tomáš Macháč without dropping a set and having not faced a seeded opponent, to reach the quarterfinals. With a win over 10th seed Alex de Minaur, also in straight sets, he reached his first major semifinal and became the first British male player to reach the last four at the US Open since Andy Murray in 2012. As a result, he reached a new career-high in the top 20 in the rankings on 9 September 2024. Draper lost to world No. 1 Jannik Sinner in the last four. At the Japan Open he reached the quarterfinals, defeating qualifier Mattia Bellucci and upsetting second seed Hubert Hurkacz, his third top 10 win of the season. He retired with an abdominal injury during his last eight match with Ugo Humbert.

Draper returned to the court three weeks later at the Vienna Open where he defeated Kei Nishikori, Luciano Darderi, Tomáš Macháč and sixth seed Lorenzo Musetti to make it through to the final where he overcame Karen Khachanov in straight sets to claim his first ATP 500 title. As a result, he made his top 15 debut in the singles rankings on 28 October 2024. The following week at the Paris Masters, he recorded wins over Jiří Lehečka and fifth seed Taylor Fritz, before losing in the third round to ninth seed Alex de Minaur in three sets.

=== 2025: Indian Wells title, World No. 4, 100th win ===
Draper withdrew from the United Cup due to a hip injury and also announced he would not play in Great Britain's Davis Cup tie against Japan. Three successive five sets wins over Mariano Navone, Thanasi Kokkinakis and Aleksandar Vukic saw him reach the fourth round at the 2025 Australian Open, where he retired due to injury after losing the opening two sets to third seed Carlos Alcaraz. After the Australian Open, Draper reached his first singles final of the year in the ATP 500 tournament in Qatar, where he was defeated by Andrey Rublev in three sets.

At the Indian Wells Open, Draper beat two top 5 players: world No. 4 Taylor Fritz in the fourth round, and world No. 3 Carlos Alcaraz in the semifinals to reach his first ATP 1000 final. He then defeated Holger Rune in the final to win his first ever ATP 1000 title and entered the top 10 at world No. 7 on 17 March 2025.

Following reaching his first clay court tour-level semifinal at the Madrid Open, Draper sealed the No. 5 spot in the singles rankings on 5 May 2025, becoming just the fourth British player to reach the top 5 in the history of the ATP Rankings (1973), joining former No. 1 Andy Murray, No. 4 Tim Henman, and No. 4 Greg Rusedski. Aged 23 years and 121 days old, by making the Madrid final, Draper became the youngest man representing Great Britain in the Open Era to reach ATP finals on clay, grass and hardcourt. At the Italian Open, he reached the fourth round recording his 100th career win. At the French Open, he made a career best run to the fourth round, before losing to Alexander Bublik.

At Wimbledon in the first round, he won against Sebastián Báez, who had to retire after being injured. He lost in the second round to Marin Čilić.

Draper's next tournament was the US Open where he defeated Federico Agustín Gómez, but then withdrew before his second round match against Zizou Bergs due to an arm injury. On 8 September he announced the seriousness of the injury would keep him out of action for the rest of the 2025 season.

In December, having received a wildcard entry, he pulled out of the Ultimate Tennis Showdown grand final in London.

=== 2026: Continued injury issues, early season ending, out of top 150 ===
Draper withdrew from the Australian Open as he had still not recovered from the arm injury which hampered him at the end of the previous season.

He made his return to competitive action playing for Great Britain in their Davis Cup qualifier against Norway in Oslo at the start of February, recording a straight sets win over Viktor Durasovic as his team secured a 4–0 victory in the overall tie. Draper pulled out of the following week's Rotterdam Open as a precaution to continue his injury rehabilitation. Later that month he made his first ATP Tour tournament appearance in six months at the Dubai Tennis Championships, defeating qualifier Quentin Halys, before losing to Arthur Rinderknech in the second round.

Seeking to defend his title from 2025 and seeded 14th at the Indian Wells Open in March, Draper was given a bye in the first round and then overcame Roberto Bautista Agut, 19th seed Francisco Cerúndolo and third seed Novak Djokovic to reach the quarterfinals, at which point his run was ended by 11th seed Daniil Medvedev. He then entered the Miami Open as the 25th seed, but lost to Reilly Opelka in the first round, in two tiebreakers.

In April, Draper withdrew from the Monte-Carlo Masters to recover from a bruised bone in his left arm. He belatedly got his clay court season underway at the Barcelona Open, but was forced to retire while trailing in the third set of his first round match against Tomás Martín Etcheverry because of a knee injury. The injury subsequently forced him to withdraw from the Madrid Open and Italian Open. Draper later also withdrew from the French Open.

Having dropped out of the world's top 150, Draper withdrew from the Queen's Club Championships, before making his comeback at the following week's Eastbourne Open where he defeated lucky loser Marcos Giron and fellow Briton, wildcard entrant Jack Pinnington Jones, to reach the quarterfinals. Next he overcame Gabriel Diallo in straight sets to make it through to the semifinals, at which point he lost to sixth seed Ugo Humbert, also in straight sets. Draper withdrew from Wimbledon due to a flare up of his previous arm injury.

After another five weeks out of action, Draper was due to begin his North American hardcourt season at the Washington Open but pulled out the day before he was scheduled to play his opening round match. Instead, he made his return to the competitive court the following week as a wildcard entrant at the Canadian Open, losing in the first round to Terence Atmane in three sets. Given a wildcard entry into the main-draw at the Cincinnati Open, Draper again lost in the first round, this time to Martin Landaluce. Eight days later he pulled out of the US Open. On 15 September, Draper announced he was ending his season with the aim of returning to competition at the start of 2027.

== Playing style ==
Draper's playing style is characterised by an aggressive all-around game and strong serve. He has a great ability to mix up his serve, using slices and flat serves to keep opponents guessing on the return. His forehand has been compared to Nadal's in its topspin, pace, and consistency.

== Coaches ==
Draper was coached by Justin Sherring (2007–2017) and then Ryan Jones (2017–2021). From 2021 to late 2025, Draper was coached by James Trotman at the National Tennis Centre in Roehampton as part of the Lawn Tennis Association's Elite Players support programme.

In 2023, Draper hired fitness coach Dejan Vojnović. He also hired technical coach Wayne Ferreira in May 2024 but split four months later before the 2024 US Open. In October 2025, it was announced that Andy Murray's former coach Jamie Delgado would be joining Draper's team in 2026 as his new main coach, with Trotman stepping back in order to spend less time on the tour. Later on in the month, it was announced that Trotman had left the team entirely.

In May 2026, ahead of the grass-court season (June–July), it was revealed that Andy Murray would be joining Draper's coaching team. The two were reported to have a friendly relationship prior to the appointment.

== Personal life ==
In 2023, Draper had an estimated wealth of $3 million and has signed sponsorship deals with the likes of Dunlop, Nike and Vodafone. His brother Ben Draper is his agent, who works for IMG Tennis-WME Sports. In August 2025, Draper signed a multi-year partnership with U.S. clothing brand Vuori to serve as a global brand ambassador.

Draper supports Manchester United F.C. and enjoys listening to rap and grime music. As of 2024, his flatmate is fellow British tennis player Paul Jubb. Cameron Norrie is a regular training partner.

== Career statistics ==
=== Grand Slam performance timeline ===
Key
W	F	SF	QF	#R	RR	Q#	DNQ	A	NH

(W) winner; (F) finalist; (SF) semifinalist; (QF) quarterfinalist; (#R) rounds 4, 3, 2, 1; (RR) round-robin stage; (Q#) qualification round; (DNQ) did not qualify; (A) absent; (NH) not held; (SR) strike rate (events won / competed); (W–L) win–loss record.
To avoid confusion and double counting, these charts are updated at the conclusion of a tournament or when the player's participation has ended.

Current through the 2026 US Open.

Tournament	2018	2019	2020	2021	2022	2023	2024	2025	2026	SR	W–L	Win %
Australian Open	A	A	A	A	A	1R	2R	4R	A	0 / 3	4–3	57%
French Open	A	A	A	A	A	1R	1R	4R	A	0 / 3	3–3	50%
Wimbledon	Q1	Q1	NH	1R	2R	A	2R	2R	A	0 / 4	3–4	43%
US Open	A	A	A	A	3R	4R	SF	2R	A	0 / 4	11–3	79%
Win–loss	0–0	0–0	0–0	0–1	3–2	3–3	7–4	8–3	0–0	0 / 14	21–13	62%

=== ATP 1000 finals ===
==== Singles: 2 (1 title, 1 runner-up) ====
Result	Year	Tournament	Surface	Opponent	Score
Win	2025	Indian Wells Open	Hard	(Denmark) Holger Rune	6–2, 6–2
Loss	2025	Madrid Open	Clay	(Norway) Casper Ruud	5–7, 6–3, 4–6
