= Roger Draper =

British sports administrator

Roger Draper is the former chief executive of Sport England from 2003 to 2006, and the Lawn Tennis Association from 2006 to 2013.

He was also Chief Executive of professional Rugby League club, Warrington Wolves from 2015 to 2017 and Executive Director of Super League.

Since 2018 he has been Global Business Advisor to Boston Consulting Group (BCG) advising Governments, Federations and Sports clubs around the World.

== Early life ==
Draper grew up in Billinge, Merseyside, and later Orrell, Greater Manchester. He attended Bolton School.

== Sport England ==
In his time at Sport England, Draper had overall accountability for business turnover of £340m, and was involved in London’s 2012 Olympic bid, and the Wembley National Stadium construction project.

As Accounting Officer for Sport England, he had responsibility for reporting to Parliament through the Secretary of State for Culture, Media and Sport, and represented the organisation at a wide range of Select Committees, including the Public Accounts Committee hearing on the Wembley National Stadium Project, in 2003.

He also led a major review and reorganisation of the £450m spent on sport in the UK.

This included the completion of the £120m English Institute of Sport network of high performance facilities including new centres at Bath and Loughborough Universities, and a review of corporate governance across a number of sports, including athletics, hockey, rugby league, golf, cricket, boxing, karate and bowls.

== British tennis ==
Draper joined the LTA in 2006, and published the ‘Blueprint, a Strategy for British Tennis’, which set out his plans to transform the national governing body for British tennis. This included a complete restructure of the organisation, a new commercial strategy and programme, the introduction of Talent ID, and a comprehensive review and rebuild of all the LTA's major events.

During his time at the LTA, turnover grew by 45% to £65m, and commercial revenues increased by three and a half times, in part the result of a ground-breaking Lead Partner agreement with pensions provider Aegon UK. British Tennis membership grew by 500% and the number of juniors playing competitive tennis sevenfold.

Draper was also responsible for introducing a new mini tennis programme and a nationwide talent ID system for British tennis. During this period, Great Britain won the Junior Davis Cup for the first time, and a number of British juniors won grand slam singles and doubles titles.

In 2013, Andy Murray became the first British man to win the Wimbledon singles title for 77 years.

== Youth participation ==
Despite a growth in the number of children playing tennis, Draper’s tenure was criticised for failing to increase levels of participation among adults.

The problems of participation came to a head when in December 2012 Sport England announced that £10.3million of the LTA's £17.4million funding total had been put on hold, with Sport England chief executive Jennie Price telling Press Association Sport: "Tennis has not performed well in terms of participation". Sport England subsequently released the funding to the LTA.

After his salary package at the LTA was revealed to be £640,000 in 2012, Draper and the LTA received further criticism, including from Baroness Billingham, the Chair of Parliament's All-Party Tennis Group.

His 7 1/2-year tenure as chief executive of the LTA came to an end in March 2013, when he announced that he would stand down in September 2013

== Warrington Wolves ==
Draper led a programme of stadium improvements, rebranded the club and launched a membership scheme, working closely with the Warrington Wolves Foundation to support its community activities and programmes.

The 2016 season was one of the most successful in the club’s history, winning the League Leaders Shield, reaching the Challenge Cup Final as well as reaching the Super League Grand Final.

== RFL/Super League ==
In 2017, Draper moved to a role as Chief Commercial Officer at the Rugby Football League and Executive Director of Super League.

The period saw an increase in the player salary cap and record attendances at the Super League Grand Final.

== Personal ==
Draper has a BSc (Hons) in P.E., Sports Science and Recreation Management from Loughborough University, where he represented England Students at both Rugby League and Tennis.

He has two sons, Ben, who was a tennis student athlete at University of California, Berkeley and Jack, who was runner-up in the 2018 Wimbledon Championships Boys’ Singles in 2018, and is a professional tennis player, who reached the semi finals of the 2024 US Open, and more recently won his first Masters 1000 title at the 2025 Indian Wells Championship.
