= David Sandiford =

English cricketer, barrister

Personal information
- Full name: David Charles Sandiford
- Born: 24 December 1970 (age 55); Bolton, Lancashire, England
- Batting: Right-handed
- Role: Wicket-keeper

Domestic team information
- Years: Team
- 1991–1992: Oxford University

Career statistics
Competition	First-class
Matches	10
Runs scored	210
Batting average	21.00
100s/50s	–/1
Top score	83
Catches/stumpings	11/1
- Source: Cricinfo, 16 April 2020

David Charles Sandiford (born 24 December 1970) is an English barrister and former first-class cricketer.

Sandiford was born in Bolton in December 1970, where he was educated at Bolton School before going up to St Edmund Hall, Oxford. While studying at Oxford, he played first-class cricket for Oxford University, making his debut against Hampshire in 1991. Sandford played first-class cricket for Oxford until 1992, making ten appearances. Playing as a wicket-keeper, he scored a total of 210 runs in his ten appearances, at an average of 21.00 and a high score of 83, while behind the stumps he took 11 catches and made a single stumping.

A member of Gray's Inn, he was called to the bar in 1995.
