= 2022 Città di Forlì V – Singles =

Singles
- 2022 Città di Forlì V

Final
- Champion: (United Kingdom) Jack Draper
- Runner-up: (United States) Alexander Ritschard
- Score: 3–6, 6–3, 7–6^{(10–8)}

Events
Singles	Doubles
← 2022 ·	Città di Forlì	· 2023 →

Jack Draper was the defending champion and successfully defended his title, defeating Alexander Ritschard 3–6, 6–3, 7–6^{(10–8)} in the final.

== Seeds ==
1. (Czech Republic) Tomáš Macháč (quarterfinals)
2. (Bosnia and Herzegovina) Damir Džumhur (first round)
3. (Italy) Salvatore Caruso (second round)
4. (Germany) Mats Moraing (second round)
5. (France) Hugo Grenier (first round)
6. (Ukraine) Illya Marchenko (second round)
7. (Belgium) Zizou Bergs (second round)
8. (Italy) Franco Agamenone (first round)

== Draw ==
=== Key ===
- Q = Qualifier
- WC = Wild card
- LL = Lucky loser
- Alt = Alternate
- SE = Special exempt
- PR = Protected ranking
- ITF = ITF entry
- JE = Junior exempt
- w/o = Walkover
- r = Retired
- d = Defaulted
- SR = Special ranking

=== Finals ===
Semifinals
SE	(Netherlands) Tim van Rijthoven	3	6^{3}
Q	(United States) Alexander Ritschard	6	7^{7}
(Bosnia and Herzegovina) Mirza Bašić	2	7^{7}	4
(United Kingdom) Jack Draper	6	6^{3}	6

Final
Q	(United States) Alexander Ritschard	6	3	6^{8}
(United Kingdom) Jack Draper	3	6	7^{10}

=== Top half ===
First round
1	(Czech Republic) T Macháč	6	6
(Slovakia) L Lacko	2	2
WC	(Italy) S Napolitano	6^{5}	6	7^{7}
Q	(Germany) Elmar Ejupovic	7^{7}	3	6^{1}
LL	(Netherlands) J Sels	7^{7}	6
Q	(Italy) F Maestrelli	6^{5}	3
SE	(Netherlands) T van Rijthoven	6	6
8	(Italy) F Agamenone	4	4
3	(Italy) S Caruso	6	6
PR	(Argentina) JP Ficovich	4	3
(Italy) A Pellegrino	4	6^{5}
(Portugal) N Borges	6	7^{7}
Q	(United States) A Ritschard	6^{5}	6	6
(Portugal) G Elias	7^{7}	2	3
(Japan) Y Uchiyama	2	7^{13}	4
6	(Ukraine) I Marchenko	6	6^{11}	6

Second round
1	(Czech Republic) T Macháč	6	6
WC	(Italy) S Napolitano	3	4
LL	(Netherlands) J Sels	4	6^{4}
SE	(Netherlands) T van Rijthoven	6	7^{7}
3	(Italy) S Caruso	2	6	6^{3}
(Portugal) N Borges	6	4	7^{7}
Q	(United States) A Ritschard	6	7
6	(Ukraine) I Marchenko	3	5

Quarterfinals
1	(Czech Republic) T Macháč	3	6^{5}
SE	(Netherlands) T van Rijthoven	6	7^{7}
(Portugal) N Borges	4	6^{7}
Q	(United States) A Ritschard	6	7^{9}

Semifinals
SE	(Netherlands) T van Rijthoven	3	6^{3}
Q	(United States) A Ritschard	6	7^{7}

=== Bottom half ===
First round
5	(France) H Grenier	6	4	2
Alt	(Canada) B Schnur	3	6	6
(Italy) L Giustino	7^{9}	4	3
(Slovakia) F Horanský	6^{7}	6	6
(Bosnia and Herzegovina) M Bašić	6	7^{7}
WC	(Italy) F Cobolli	3	6^{2}
Q	(Italy) A Arnaboldi	4	4
4	(Germany) M Moraing	6	6
7	(Belgium) Z Bergs	6	7
WC	(Italy) M Arnaldi	4	5
(Ukraine) V Sachko	6^{2}	4
Q	(United States) M Mmoh	7^{7}	6
(Netherlands) J de Jong	6	4	6^{4}
(United Kingdom) J Draper	4	6	7^{7}
Q	(Italy) G Ferrari	7	7^{7}
2	(Bosnia and Herzegovina) D Džumhur	5	6^{4}

Second round
Alt	(Canada) B Schnur	6	6^{5}	4
(Slovakia) F Horanský	4	7^{7}	6
(Bosnia and Herzegovina) M Bašić	6	7^{7}
4	(Germany) M Moraing	3	6^{4}
7	(Belgium) Z Bergs	4	2
Q	(United States) M Mmoh	6	6
(United Kingdom) J Draper	6	6
Q	(Italy) G Ferrari	2	4

Quarterfinals
(Slovakia) F Horanský	3	1
(Bosnia and Herzegovina) M Bašić	6	6
Q	(United States) M Mmoh	7	4	2
(United Kingdom) J Draper	5	6	6

Semifinals
(Bosnia and Herzegovina) M Bašić	2	7^{7}	4
(United Kingdom) J Draper	6	6^{3}	6
