= John Ratledge =

English cricketer and barrister

Personal information
- Full name: John Ratledge
- Born: 8 August 1974 (age 52); Preston, Lancashire, England
- Batting: Right-handed
- Bowling: Right-arm medium

Domestic team information
- Years: Team
- 1994–1997: Cambridge University
- 2006: Cumberland

Career statistics
| Competition | First-class |
|---|---|
| Matches | 27 |
| Runs scored | 942 |
| Batting average | 20.94 |
| 100s/50s | 1/4 |
| Top score | 100* |
| Balls bowled | 124 |
| Wickets | 1 |
| Bowling average | 108.00 |
| 5 wickets in innings | 0 |
| 10 wickets in match | 0 |
| Best bowling | 1/16 |
| Catches/stumpings | 5/– |
- Source: Cricinfo, 13 January 2019

John Ratledge (born 8 August 1974) is an English barrister and former first-class cricketer.

Born at Preston, Ratledge was educated at Bolton School, before going up to St John's College, Cambridge to study law. While studying at Cambridge he played first-class cricket for Cambridge University, making his debut against Nottinghamshire at Fenner's in 1994. He played first-class cricket for Cambridge from 1994–1997, making a total of 27 appearances at first-class level. Ratledge ended his first-class career having scored a total of 942 runs at an average of 20.04, with a highest score of 100 not out. This score was his only first-class century and came against Oxford University in 1997, in what was his final first-class match. He also bowled twenty overs with his medium pace bowling across his career, taking a single wicket and conceding 108 runs. He gained a blue in cricket.

After graduating from St John's, Ratledge was called to the bar in 1999. He played minor counties cricket for Cumberland in 2006, making four appearances in the Minor Counties Championship. After spending twenty years practicing law at the St John’s Buildings in Manchester, Ratledge moved to East Anglia to practice in Norwich.
