= Impalement (heraldry) =

Way of combining two coats-of-arms

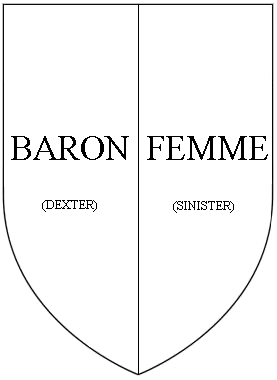
Impalement in heraldry: on the dexter side of the escutcheon, the position of greatest honour, are placed the arms of the husband (baron), with the paternal arms of the wife (femme) on the sinister.

Impalement is a heraldic practice in which two coats of arms are combined in one shield to denote a union. The impaled shield is bisected in pale, that is by a vertical line, with each half of the shield displaying one coat of arms. Most often the practice is used to denote the union of a husband and wife in marriage, but impalement is also used to display unions with an ecclesiastical office, academic position, government office, or mystical union.

== Marital ==
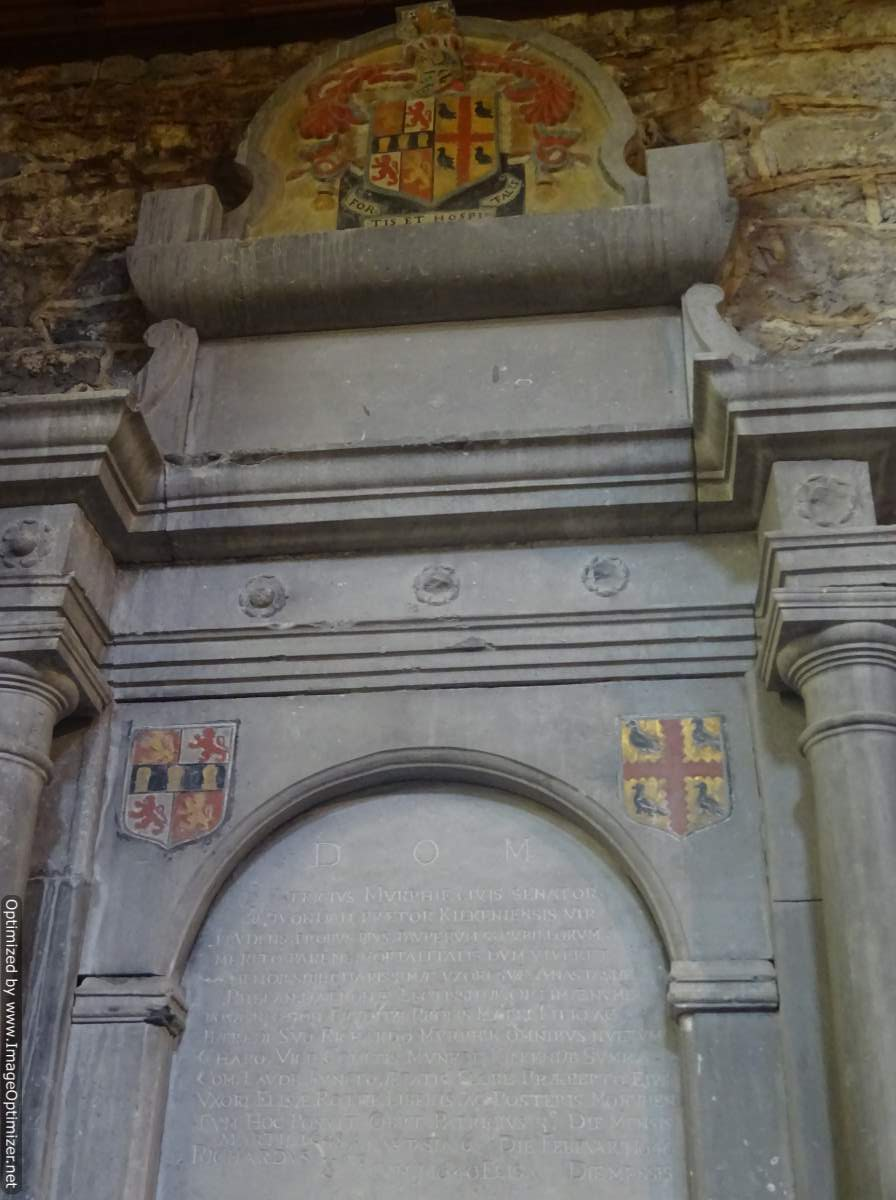
Memorial stone in Kilkenny, Ireland, depicting the family arms separated, and then impaled together on top.

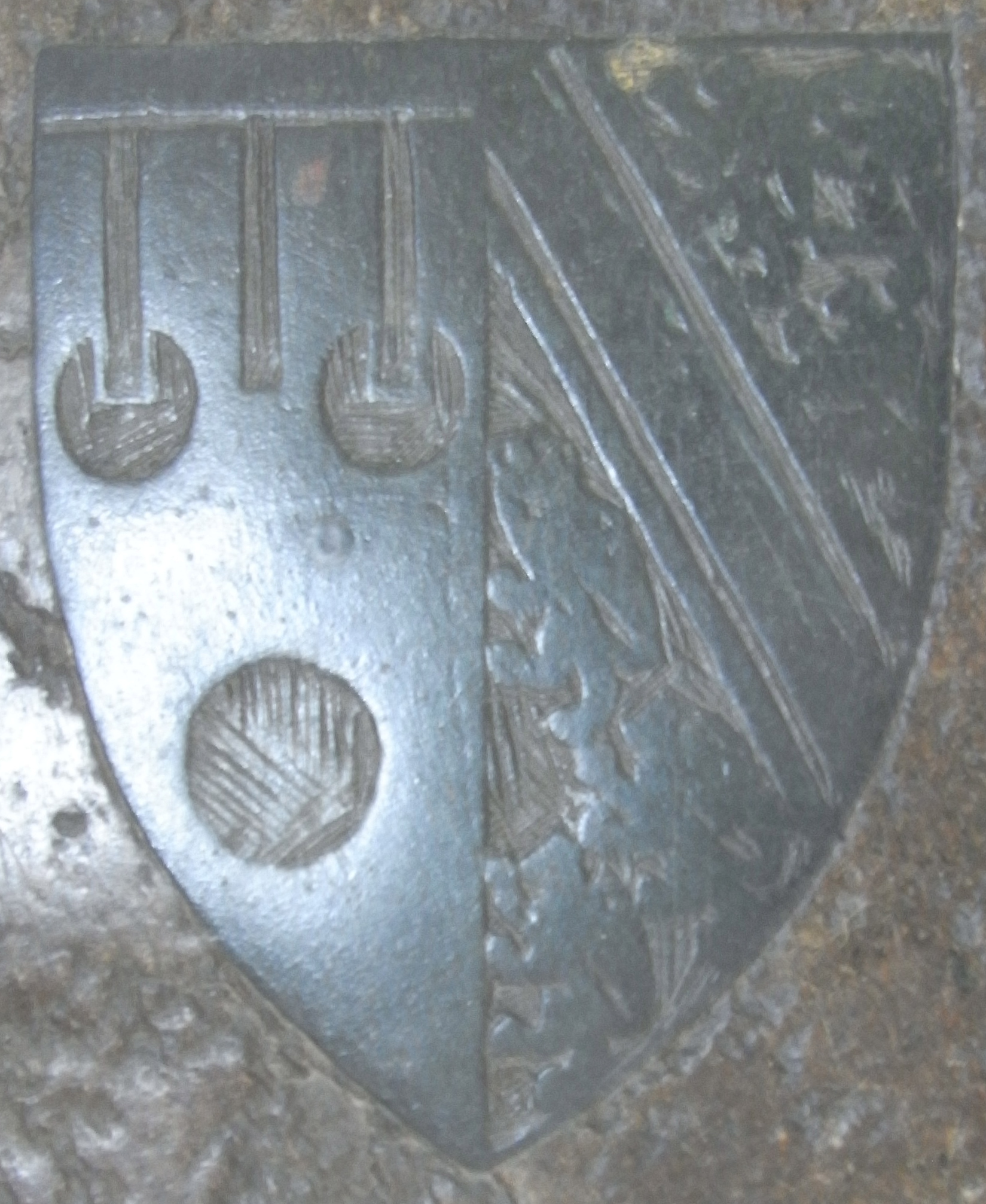
Escutcheon from monumental brass of Sir Peter Courtenay (d.1405), KG, Exeter Cathedral, Devon, showing Or, three torteaux a label azure (Courtenay) impaling Azure, a bend argent cotised or between six lions rampant or (Bohun). This impaled shield shows the arms of his father (Hugh de Courtenay, 2nd Earl of Devon) impaling the paternal arms of his mother, Margaret de Bohun, the daughter of Humphrey de Bohun, 4th Earl of Hereford

The husband's arms are shown in the dexter half (on the right hand of someone standing behind the shield, to the viewer's left), being the place of honour, with the wife's paternal arms in the sinister half. For this purpose alone the two halves of the impaled shield are called baron and femme, from ancient Norman-French usage. Impalement is not used when the wife is an heraldic heiress, that is to say when she has no brothers to carry on bearing her father's arms (or, if her brothers have died, they have left no legitimate descendants) in which case her paternal arms are displayed on an escutcheon of pretence in the centre of her husband's arms, denoting that the husband is a pretender to the paternal arms of his wife, and that they will devolve upon the couple's heir(s) as quarterings. When a husband has been married more than once, the sinister half of femme is split per fess, that is to say horizontally in half, with the paternal arms of the first wife shown in chief and those of the second wife in base. The sinister side may thus be divided more than twice in similar fashion where required.

The use of impaled arms serves to identify with precision which member of the male line of a family is represented, if the identity of his wife is known, for example from a pedigree. Frequently impaled arms appear sculpted on ancient buildings, thus allowing architectural historians to identify the builder. Impaled arms also appear frequently on monuments in parish churches, and again facilitate identification of the person for whom erected. A convenient and descriptive term for "a heraldic escutcheon showing the impaled arms of a husband and wife" is "a match", and this word was used frequently by, amongst others, Tristram Risdon (d.1640) in his manorial history Survey of Devon. For example: "The north aisle of Swimbridge Church was built by Sir John Mules of Ernsborough, as the inscription in a window, and a proof there once fairly printed and guilded, with the arms and matches of that family, make evident". Also: "(William Hankford) is pourtraited kneeling in his robes together with his own match and the match of some of his ancestors insculpt thereon in brass" (in Monkleigh Church, Devon).

For same-sex married couples, the College of Arms in 2014 decreed that male couples may impale their arms together but that each individual will have distinguished arms and crests of their own (i.e. the arms of a given partner will have his own arms on dexter and his partner's in sinister with his own crest; his partner's will be the opposite). Slightly different rules apply to female couples and heraldic heiresses.

== Ecclesiastical ==
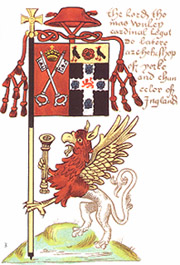
Banner of Cardinal Wolsey as Archbishop of York. His personal arms in sinister (to viewer's right) are impaled with the arms of the See of York in dexter (to viewer's left), the position of honour.

In ecclesiastical heraldry, a bishop's familial arms are impaled with those of his diocese or see, with the dexter position of greater honour being occupied by the arms of the see, and the incumbent's arms in sinister.

== Academic/Civic ==
Heads of educational establishments, for example of Oxbridge colleges, many of whom were historically former clergymen, traditionally impaled their personal and college arms, during their term of office. Likewise, this privilege extends to senior civic office holders, for example Mayors, Masters of Livery Companies, etc.

== Mystical ==
Escutcheon of King Richard II of England impaled by attributed arms of King Edward the Confessor

A rare use of impalement is that where a mystical union is believed to exist between the two parties. Such was the case with King Richard II (1377–1399) who had a particular devotion to the saint King Edward the Confessor. Although the saint lived in the pre-heraldic era, his attributed arms were employed by King Richard in impaling his own royal Arms of Plantagenet, as an outward sign of such a mystical quasi-marriage. The Confessor's arms were shown in the dexter position of honour.

== Tierce ==
Arms of Brasenose College, Oxford. The inescutcheon obscures the middle tierce

A rare form of impalement which allows for the juxtaposition of three armorials is tiercing. This is more common in Continental Europe to demonstrate dynastic and territorial relationships. In England it is occasionally used where a man has married twice, with the middle tierce, of greatest honour, showing his own arms. It is also used rarely in England to denote broader relationships, for example in the arms of three Oxford colleges. In the arms of Brasenose College, Oxford the dexter tierce shows the personal arms of one founder William Smyth, while the middle tierce of greatest honour shows the arms of the See of Lincoln, to show his position as Bishop of Lincoln; the sinister tierce shows the personal arms of the other founder Sir Richard Sutton. As with the simple impaled arms of a bishop, the arms of the see are shown in the position of greatest honour, in that case in the dexter half. Of the three tierces, the middle is of greatest honour, the dexter next, and least in honour the sinister tierce. The arms of Lincoln College, Oxford are similar, with the dexter and middle tierces representing the founder Richard Fleming, Bishop of Lincoln, and the sinister tierce carrying the arms of Thomas Rotherham, a major donor who is considered as co-founder of the current college. At Corpus Christi College, Oxford the dexter tierce shows a pelican vulning herself representing the Body of Christ (Latin: Corpus Christi), which was adopted by the founder Richard Foxe as his coat of arms; the middle tierce shows the arms of the See of Winchester, reflecting Foxe's position as Bishop of Winchester, while the sinister tierce shows the personal arms of the co-founder Hugh Oldham.

=== Example: institutional ===
The arms of Brasenose College, Oxford are: Tierced in pale: (1) Argent, a chevron sable between three roses gules seeded or, barbed vert (for Smyth); (2) or, an escutcheon of the arms of the See of Lincoln (gules, two lions of England in pale or, on a chief azure Our Lady crowned seated on a tombstone issuant from the chief, in her dexter arm the Infant Jesus, in her sinister arm a sceptre, all or), ensigned with a mitre proper; (3) quarterly, first and fourth argent, a chevron between three bugle-horns stringed sable; second and third argent, a chevron between three crosses crosslet sable (for Sutton).

=== Example: marital ===
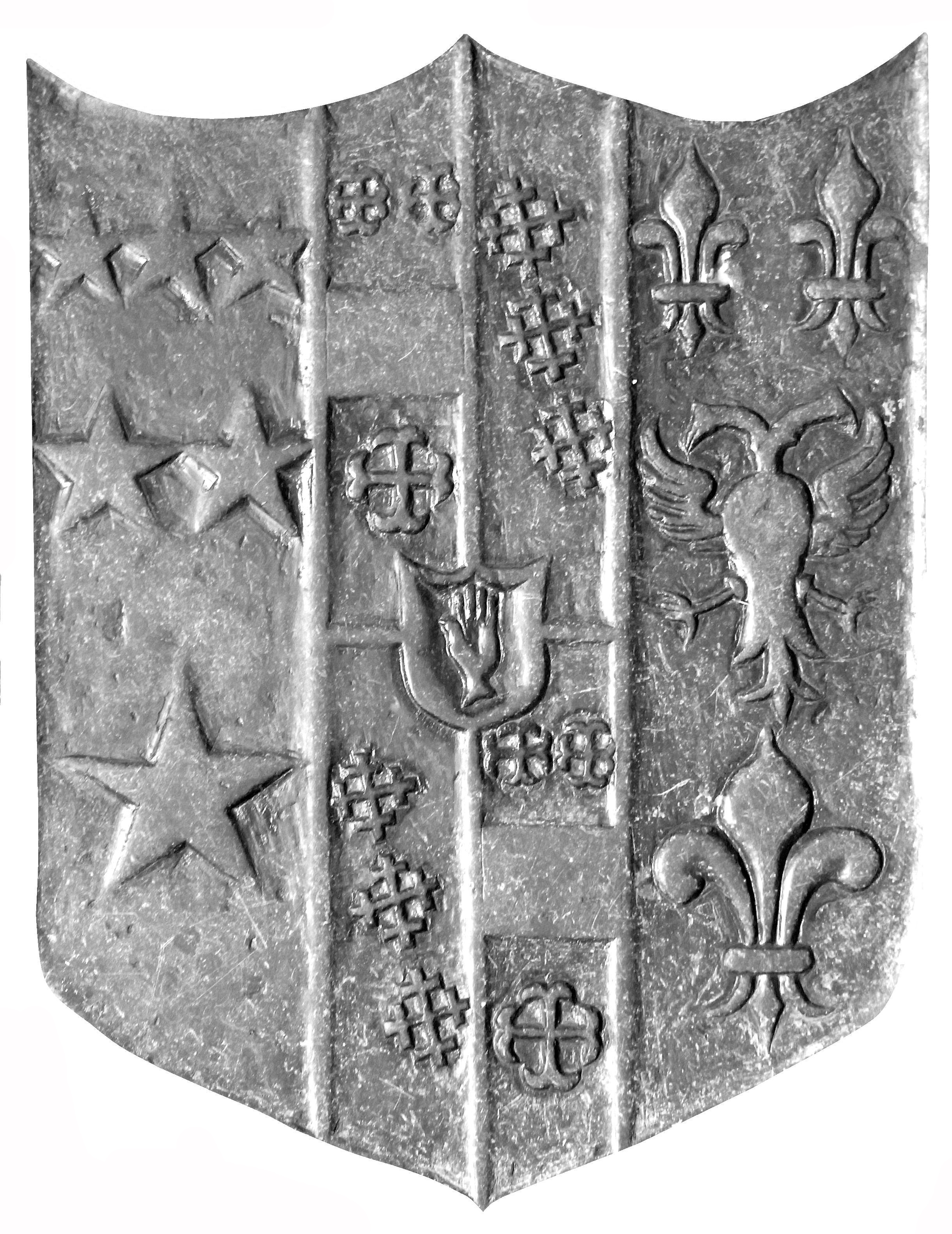
Arms of Sir Arthur Northcote, 2nd Baronet (1628–1688), detail from ledger stone, King's Nympton Church, Devon, England

The arms of Sir Arthur Northcote, 2nd Baronet (1628–1688), sculpted on his ledger stone in King's Nympton Church, Devon, England, show a shield tierced per pale, the second (central) part showing his paternal arms of four quarters. The dexter part shows the arms of Walshe (six mullets 3:2:1), representing his first wife Elizabeth the daughter of James Walsh of Alverdiscot in Devon. The sinister part shows the arms of Godolphin (an eagle displayed double headed between three fleurs-de-lis), representing his second wife Elizabeth the daughter of Sir Francis Godolphin of Godolphin in Cornwall.

== See also ==
- Courtoisie
- Dimidiation (historically earlier method of combining two coats of arms)
- Division of the field
