= John Roberts (British businessman) =

British businessman (born 1973)

- Born: 8 October 1973 (age 52)
- Education: Bolton School
- Occupation: Businessman
- Title: CEO and founder, AO World
- Spouse: Sally Roberts
- Children: 5

John Roberts (born 8 October 1973) is a British businessman, entrepreneur and philanthropist. He is the founder and CEO of AO World, an online retailer specialising in electrical goods, and 30 year campaigner for young people including supporting youth charity, OnSide Youth Zones.

== Early life ==
Roberts grew up in Bolton. He went to Bolton School, and earned eight GCSEs, but failed his A-levels in maths, geography and economics.

== Career ==
Roberts started his career as a waiter and kitchen salesman.

In 2000, he founded Appliances Online, after a friend bet him £1 to set up a business. In 2014, Roberts led AO World’s listing on the London Stock Exchange, valued at the time at £1.6 billion.

In May 2019, the Sunday Times Rich List put Roberts' wealth at £210 million.

In February 2017, he stood down as CEO of AO World, and was succeeded by Steve Caunce. Two years later, in January 2019, AO World announced that Caunce was stepping down as CEO, and Roberts was reassuming the role.

Roberts has said he built AO on his two personal mottos of ‘treat every customer like your gran’ and ‘make your mum proud’.

In September 2021, Roberts was listed 30 in the Financial Times list of the UK’s Top 100 Entrepreneurs. He won the This is Manchester Supernova Award in 2018 and the Retail Week Retail Activist Award in 2020.

== Philanthropy ==
Roberts has been a supporter of Bolton Lads and Girls Club for more than 30 years. In 2016, Roberts and his wife Sally gave £1.5 million to OnSide Youth Zones. He has been a Trustee of the charity since 2015. In 2020, he pledged to give OnSide Youth Zones his £20 million bonus if the AO Value Creation Plan pays out. He says he gives most of his earnings to charity.

Over the last 12 months, Roberts has been an increasingly vocal campaigner to restore over £1bn of lost funding to youth infrastructure which would be matched by private philanthropy, to reform the Apprenticeship Levy and to consider radical solutions to fix the care system for "looked after children".

== Personal life ==
He is married to Sally Roberts, they have five children, and live in Bolton. It was reported that he will not allow his children to work for the company, nor will they inherit, and is "considering putting his wealth into a charitable trust".
