= Donald Geoffrey Charlton =

- Born: 8 April 1925; Bolton
- Died: 22 December 1995 (aged 70); Tenerife
- Citizenship: British
- Education: Emmanuel College, Cambridge
- Spouse: Thelma Masters
- Children: 1 son, 2 daughters
- Scientific career
- Fields: French Studies
- Workplaces: University of Hull, University of Warwick
- Thesis: Positivist Thought in France during the Second Empire, 1852–1870 (1955)
- Doctoral advisor: H. J. Hunt

Donald Geoffrey Charlton (8 April 1925 – 22 December 1995) was a professor of French at the University of Warwick from 1964 to 1989.

== Education and career ==
Charlton was educated at Bolton School and briefly went on to study philosophy on a short course scheme at St Edmund Hall, Oxford, before joining the Royal Navy as an interpreter for French and German.

After the War, he matriculated at Emmanuel College, Cambridge, to read modern languages. He graduated in 1948 with first-class honours, and was soon appointed as a lecturer at University College Hull (chartered as the University of Hull in 1954). While lecturing at Hull, Charlton completed a PhD at the University of London supervised by H. J. Hunt.

After fifteen years as a lecturer at Hull University (1949–1964), he was appointed the first Professor of French at Warwick University in 1964, remaining there until his retirement in 1989.

In 1983 he delivered the Gifford Lectures at the University of St Andrews.

After his retirement he was presented with a Festschrift: French Literature, Thought and Culture in the Nineteenth Century: A Material World (1993).

== Works ==
=== As author ===
- Positivist Thought in France during the Second Empire, 1852-1870 (1959)
- Secular Religions in France, 1815-1870 (1963)
- New Images of the Natural in France: A Study in European Cultural History 1750-1800 (1984)

=== As editor ===
- France: A Companion to French Studies (1972)
- The French Romantics (1984)
