= Malcolm Stevens =

English chemist and professor

Malcolm Stevens OBE, FRS
- Born: Malcolm Francis Graham Stevens; 1938 (age 87–88)
- Citizenship: British
- Education: Bolton School
- Alma mater: University of Nottingham
- Spouse: Valerie Deans (m.1961)

Malcolm Francis Graham Stevens is an English chemist and Emeritus professor of the University of Nottingham, having previously worked at Aston University where he developed the cancer drug temozolomide.

== Education and family ==
Stevens attended Bolton School, Lancashire, and then obtained a BSc and PhD at the University of Nottingham.

He married Valerie Deans at Christ Church, Heaton, Bolton, in 1961.

== Career ==
Stevens took up a post of Reader in the Department of Pharmaceutical Sciences at Aston University in 1972, and was later appointed Professor. He was a member of the Cancer Research UK Experimental Cancer Chemotherapy group from 1980 to 2006, moving to the University of Nottingham in 1992. Stevens's lab synthesised Temozolomide, which as of 2019, remains the only FDA-approved drug to treat the deadly brain tumor Glioblastoma multiforme. Temozolomide has had a substantial impact in the clinic: the 5-year survival with radiation alone is 4%, whilst with radiation plus temozolomide, it approaches 17%. The 10 year survival without temozolomide is <1% versus around 8% with temozolomide. Thus, long term survivorship with GBM is now possible (if not common), thanks to the work of Stevens and his group.

== Recognition ==
Stevens was appointed OBE in the 1999 New Year Honours "For services to the development of Cancer Drugs", being described as "Professor of Experimental Cancer Chemotherapy, University of Nottingham". He was elected a Fellow of the Royal Society in 2009.
