= Heraldic heiress =

Title given to a man assigned to the role in the coat of arms's daughter

Simple example of incorporating an heiress's arms as an escutcheon of pretence. Note that this does not display the arms of their children, but rather the changes to the heiress's arms once she marries. Their children's arms are instead quartered.

In English heraldry an heraldic heiress is a daughter of a deceased man who was entitled to a coat of arms (an armiger) and who carries forward the right to those arms for the benefit of her future male descendants. This carrying forward only applies if she has no brothers or other male relatives alive who would inherit the arms on the death of the holder.

A woman is an heiress if

- she has no brothers, or
- all her brothers die without sons or daughters.:

She is an heiress in her issue if she dies having children and the line of her brothers becomes extinct, that is, all brothers and their children have died. Illegitimate women who are armigers are also regarded as heiresses, even if they also have brothers.

In the tradition of English heraldry, which also applies to Wales and pre-1922 Ireland, a man's right to display his coat of arms also applies to his children and his wife (his sons' arms having differencing symbols). His first-born son will inherit the undifferenced (identical) arms on his father's death and pass them on to his descendants. If there is no male line surviving at the armiger's death then each of his surviving daughters becomes an heraldic heiress who holds equally the right of ownership of the arms in trust for her son, who then becomes the absolute owner of the arms.

Coat of Arms of Birgitte, Duchess of Gloucester, who is an heraldic heiress. It depicts her father's arms imposed over her husband's (Richard, Duke of Gloucester).

A similar system applies in Scottish heraldry, though only the oldest daughter is a heraldic heiress.

== Marriage of an heraldic heiress ==
If an heraldic heiress marries an armiger, then, rather than impaling her arms on the sinister side of his as would be usual in the marriage of a woman whose father bore arms, she instead displays her father's arms on a small shield over the centre of his shield – an "escutcheon of pretence" – for as long as there is no blood male in her extended family. Her husband never owns her inherited arms, and they cannot pass on his death to any of his sons who are not also hers.

== Heiresses of non-armigerous families ==
In some cases, an heiress of a non-armigerous family may transmit a claim of quarterings from an armigerous family to which she is also an heir (for instance, the only daughter of a family without arms whose mother was an heiress of a family entitled to arms). In this case, her heirs' claim to quarterings through her is dormant, unless and until a petition of arms is granted for the non-armigerous family.

== Death of husband ==
On the death of her husband, her first-born son inherits arms from both parents and quarters them, creating a new coat to pass to his descendants in the usual way.
