= Women in heraldry =

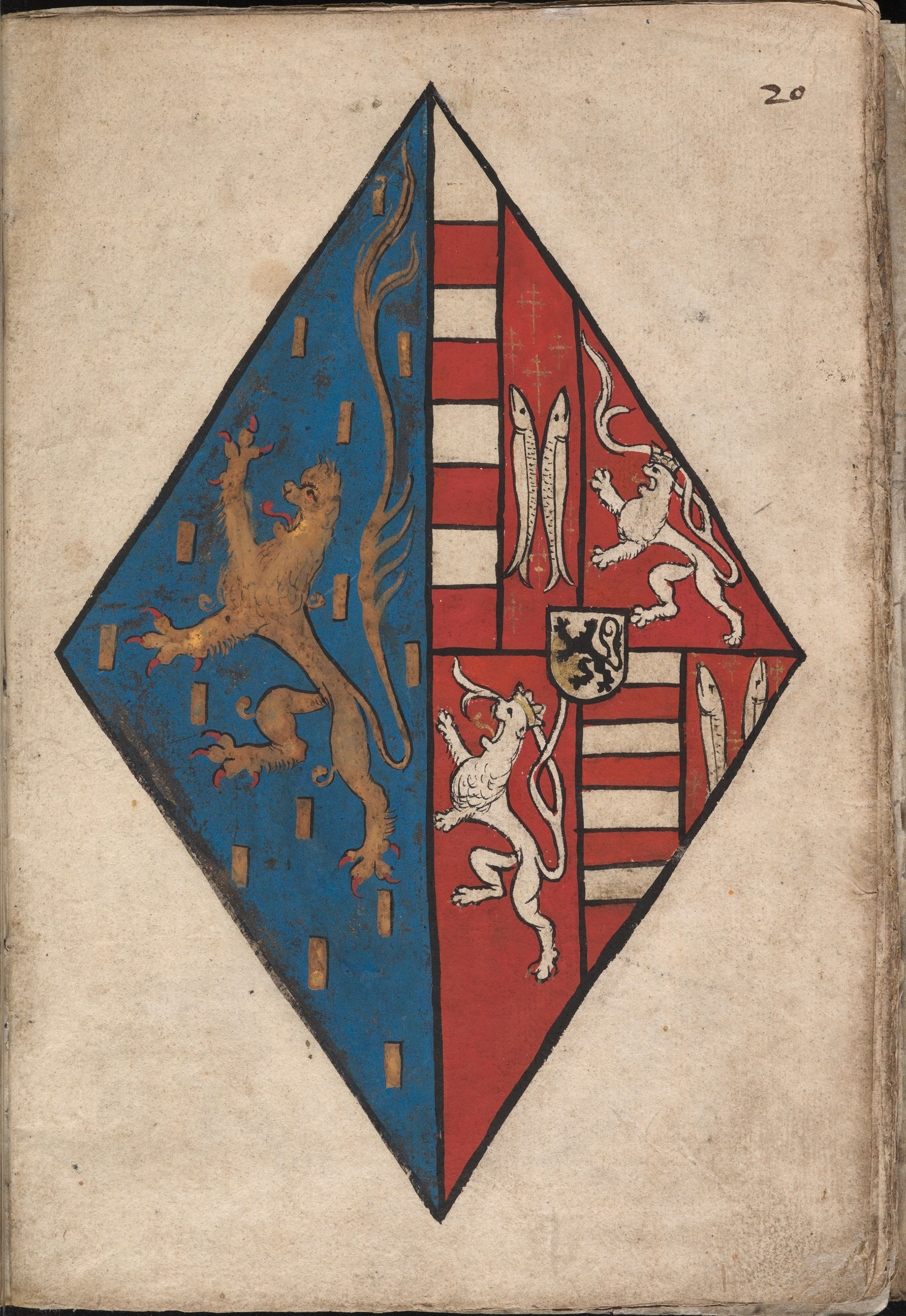
Alliance arms of Mary of Looz-Heinsberg. Arms of women were usually depicted on lozenges. Here, her family arms are impaled with those of her husband, John IV, Count of Nassau-Siegen.

Due to the differing role of women in past society, special rules grew relating to the blazoning of arms for women. The rules for women and heraldry developed differently from place to place and there is no one single rule that applies everywhere. In general, arms of women were most likely depicted not on shields but on lozenges or ovals. Different rules exist that depend on the woman's marital status and a married woman would also often make use of her husband's arms in addition to those from her family. In both the English and the Scottish systems of heraldry these differences remain active.

== Characteristics ==
=== Escutcheons, crests, and other heraldic elements ===
Heraldry has its origins from associations with warfare and the age of chivalry. The traditional shield was also associated with war and so women did not usually display familial arms on escutcheons. Rather, they could display these on various other shapes: more commonly the lozenge, an oval, or a cartouche.

The crest–a device that sits atop the shield on an armorial achievement–likewise was not accorded to heraldic devices of women as these had associations with warfare.

=== Transmission ===
In many heraldic traditions, arms generally are passed patrilineally. In other nations' traditions, Canadian heraldry for example, women may inherit arms on an equal basis with their brothers (if any). Women in Canada may also transmit their arms to their heirs, regardless of sex. (Note: This system of equality for men and women is a result of provisions in the Canadian Charter of Rights and Freedoms, which guarantee, among other things, freedom from discrimination under the law on the basis of sex.)

== By tradition ==
=== British Heraldry ===
The coat of arms of Margaret Thatcher. In some heraldic traditions, the arms of women are displayed in a lozenge, as opposed to a shield.

In English, Scottish and Northern Irish heraldry, a woman may bear arms by inheritance from her father or by grant to herself. When unmarried, she displays her arms on a lozenge (a diamond shape) or on an oval or oval-like shape. Traditionally, a woman does not display her arms on a shield, as the shield originated with knights and warfare, and is thus viewed as fitting for a man, but not a woman.

The arms of Sophie, Duchess of Edinburgh (right) impaled with those of her husband, Prince Edward, Duke of Edinburgh (left)

When married, a woman has the option of uniting her arms with those of her husband in what are called marital arms; their arms are impaled, meaning they are placed side by side in the same shield, with those of the man on the dexter (left, as seen from the front) and those of his wife on the sinister (right, as seen from the front). If one spouse belongs to the higher ranks of an order of chivalry, and is thereby entitled to surround his or her arms with a circlet of the order, it is usual to depict them on two separate shields tilted towards one another, this is termed "accollé".

Coat of arms of Birgitte, Duchess of Gloucester who is a heraldic heiress. Depicting her father's arms imposed over those of Prince Richard, Duke of Gloucester, her husband.

A married woman may also bear either her own arms or her husband's arms alone on a shield with the shield charged with a small lozenge to distinguish her from her husband.

A widowed woman usually displays the impaled arms on a lozenge-shaped shield, unless she is a heraldic heiress (see below).

Mary Mathew was the first woman to be granted her own Coat of Arms in 1558.

==== Heraldic Heiresses ====
If the woman is an heraldic heiress, her arms are shown on an inescutcheon of pretence, which is a small shield in the centre of her husband's arms. When widowed, instead of showing the impaled arms on a lozenge, she continues to use her marital arms, but placed on a lozenge or oval. In England and Northern Ireland, if there is more than one surviving daughter, each transmits her father's arms on equal terms. In Scotland however, only the eldest surviving daughter transmits her father's undifferenced arms to her offspring.

=== Canadian Heraldry ===
In Canadian heraldry, women and men are treated equally for heraldic purpose, reflecting Canadian equality laws. It is therefore common to display the arms of women on shields, rather than on a lozenge or oval, but a woman may still choose to have her arms displayed on a traditional shape.

In many systems of heraldry, the arms of each living person must be unique. English heraldry has used armorial variants to distinguish the arms of brothers from their father's arms and from each other since the thirteenth century; this is now normally done by the system of marks or brisures set up by the early Tudor herald John Writhe. Canada adds a unique series of brisures for use by female children who inherit arms. As in other heraldic systems, these cadency marks are not always used; in any case, when the heir succeeds (in Canada, the first child, whether male or female, according to strict primogeniture), the mark of cadency is removed and the heir uses the plain coat of arms.

== Gallery ==
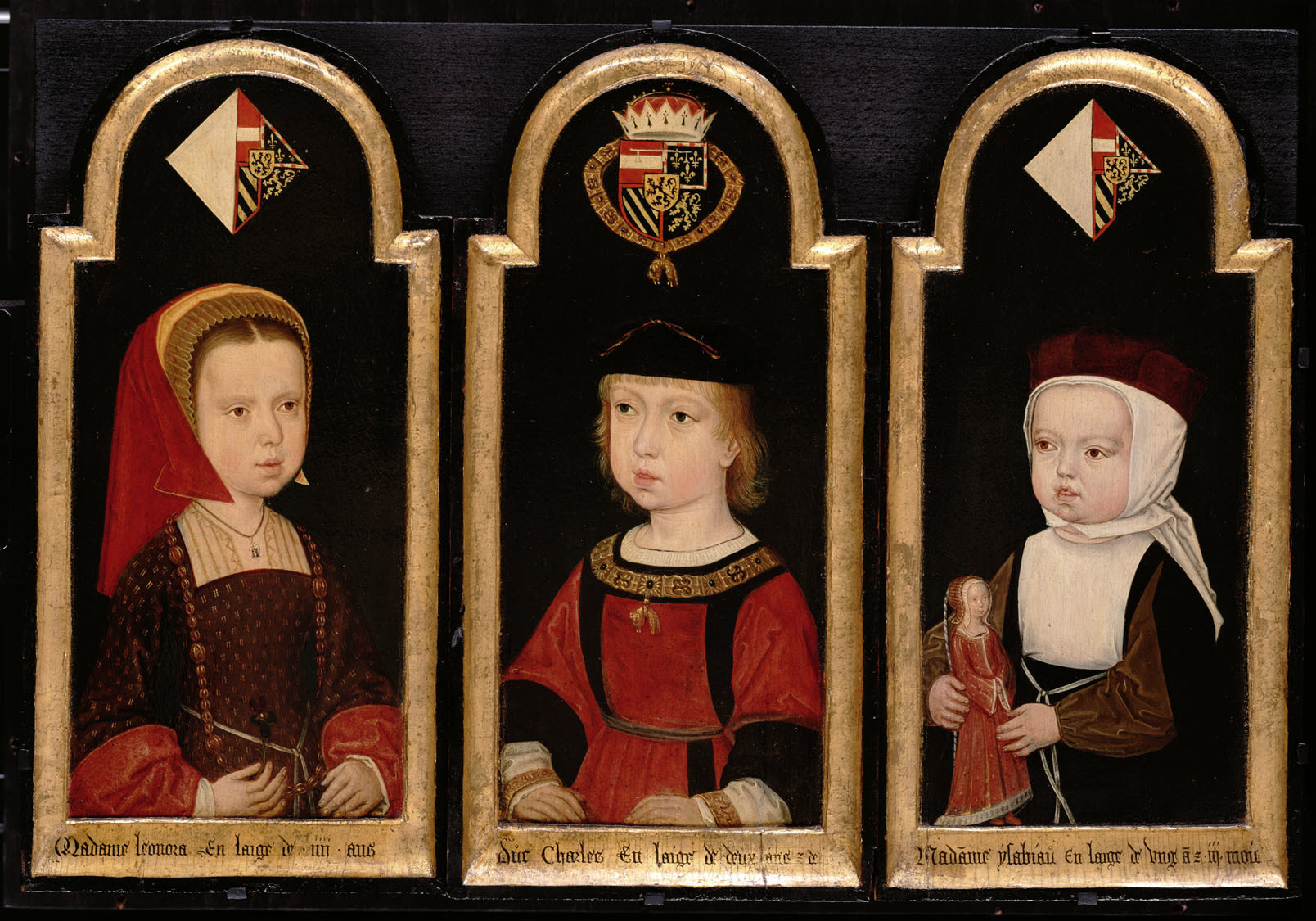
Archduke Charles (later Holy Roman Emperor Charles V), aged 2, with his sisters Eleonore and Isabella. Charles's arms are depicted on a shield with a label indicating that he is his father's heir while those of his sisters are on lozenges with half left blank, to be filed with those of their future husbands.

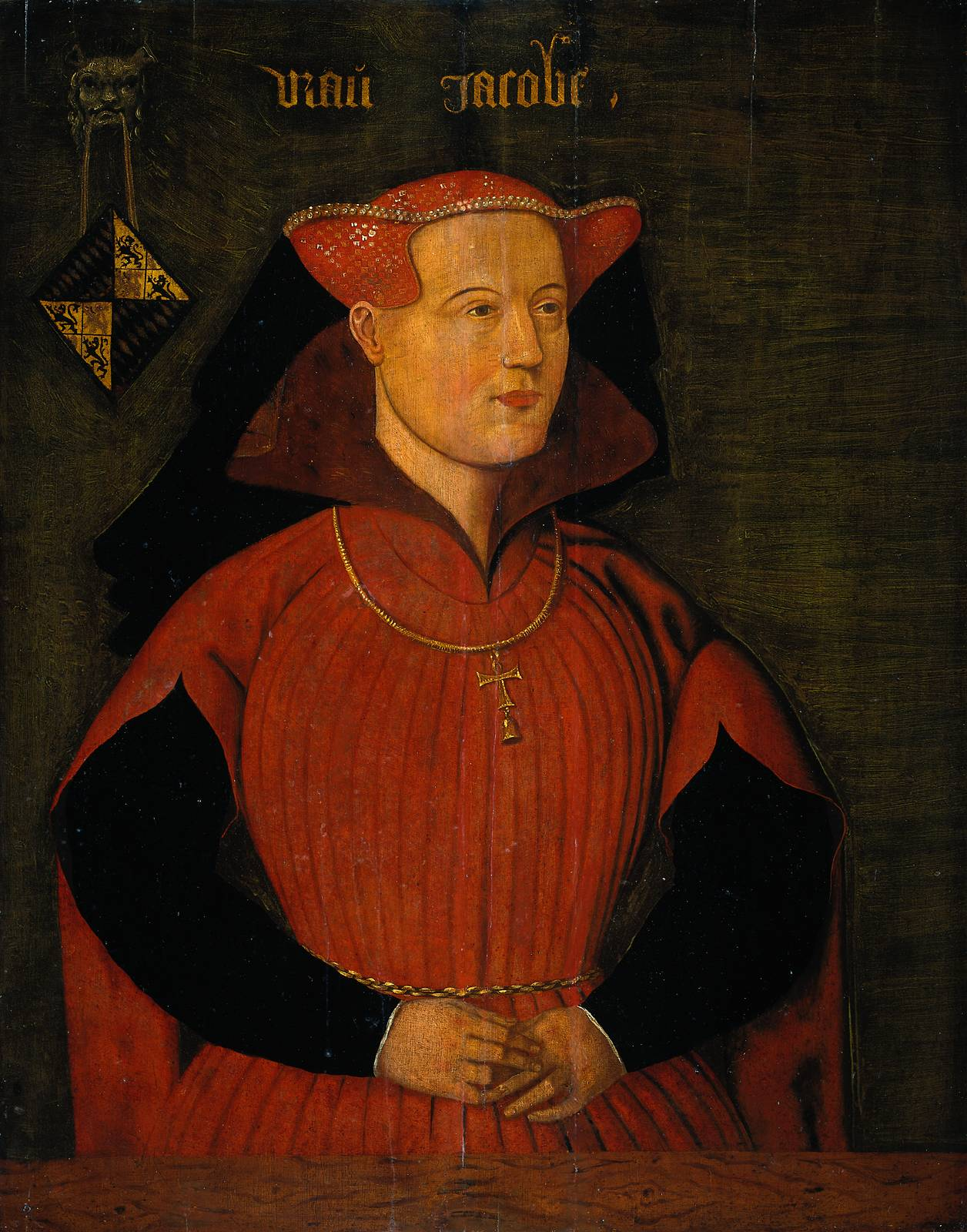
Jacqueline, Countess of Hainaut (c. 1435)

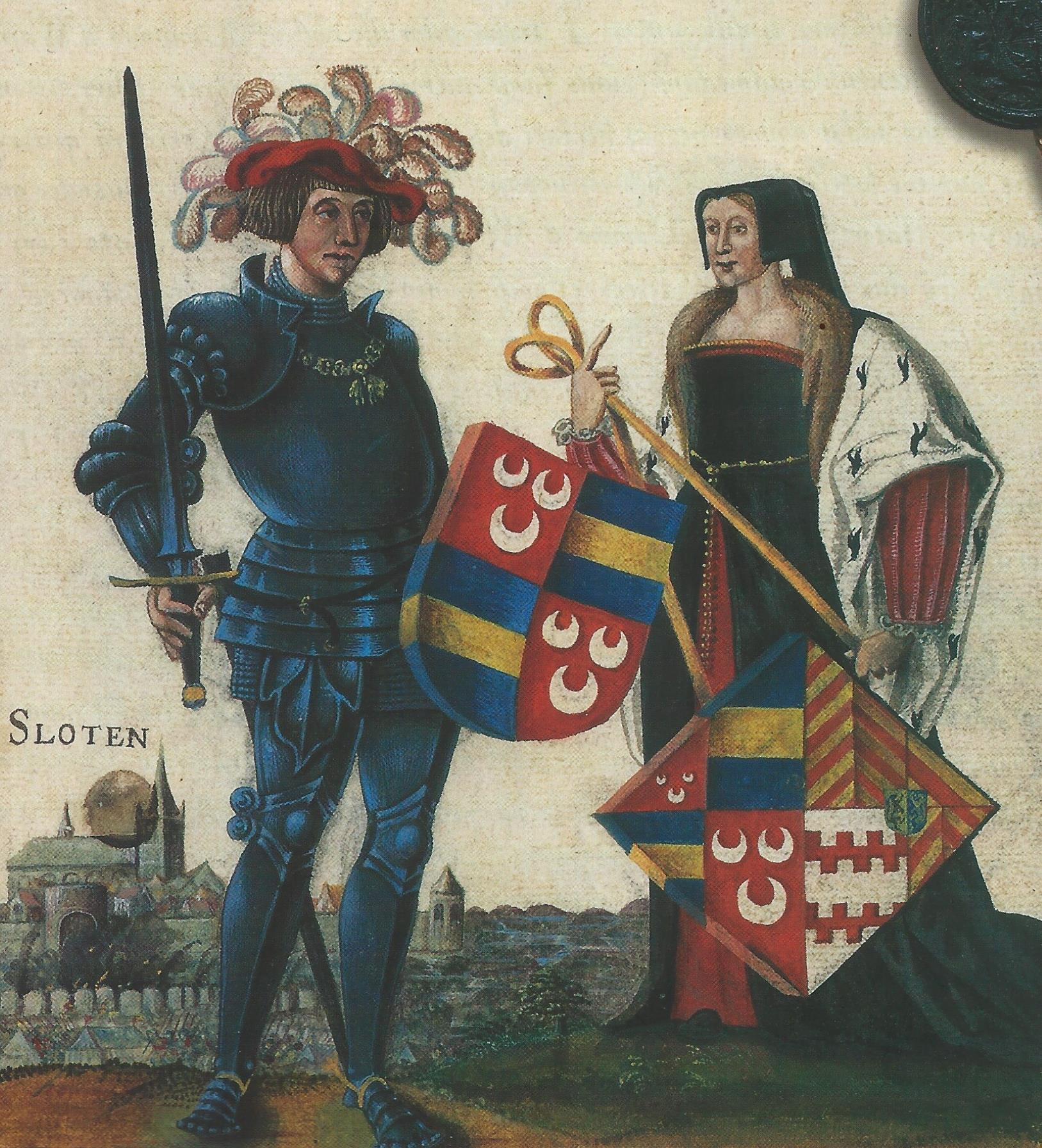
Jan van Wassenaar (1483–1523) and Josina van Egmond (1485–1538)

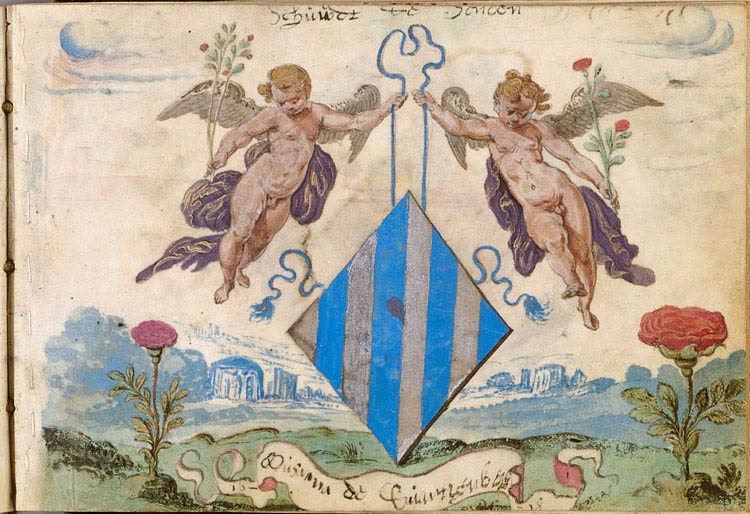
Arms of Susanna thoe Schwartzenberg

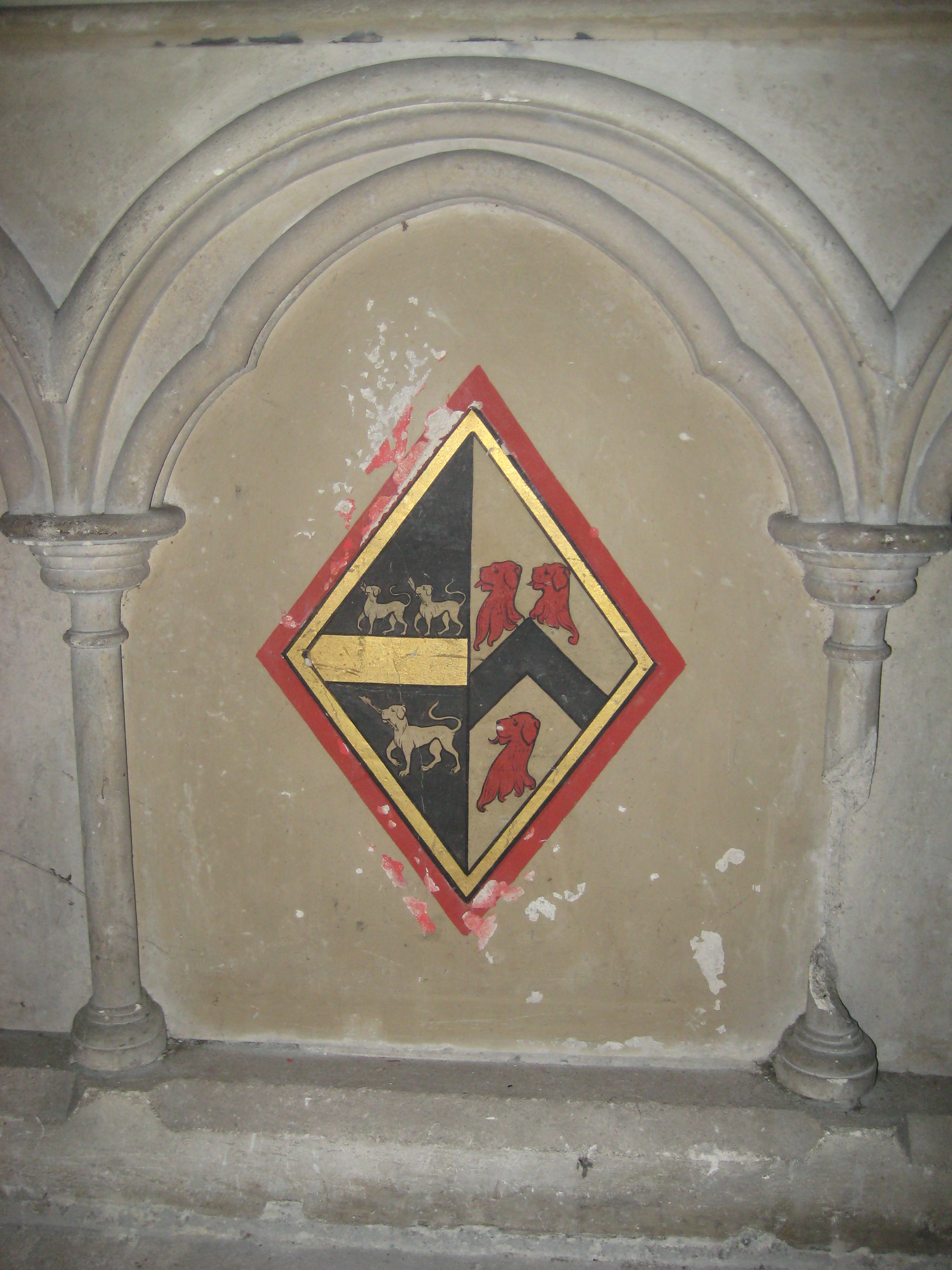
The arms of Sophia Sheppard (née Routh) showing the arms impaled, meaning that she survived her husband.

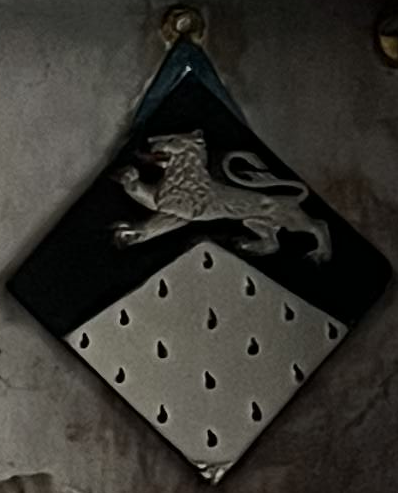
Arms of Mary Mathew, the first woman to be granted her own coat of arms in 1558.

== See also ==
- Baron and feme
- Coverture
- Elizabeth Roads
- Arms of alliance
