= AO World =

UK electrical retailer

AO World plc
- Trade name: ao.com
- Type: Public limited company
- Traded as: LSE: AO.
- Industry: Online retail
- Founded: 2000; 26 years ago
- Founder: John Roberts
- Headquarters: Bolton, England, UK
- Area served: United Kingdom
- Key people: John Roberts (Chief executive officer); Geoff Cooper (Chairman)
- Revenue: ▲£1,266.6 million (2026)
- Operating income: ▲£49.4 million (2026)
- Net income: ▲£35.9 million (2026)
- Owner: Frasers Group (25.01%); Camelot Capital Partners (20.4%); John Roberts (18.3%); Odey Asset Management (5.2%)
- Website: www.ao-world.com

AO World plc, trading as ao.com, is an electrical retailer based in Bolton, England. It operates in the United Kingdom (ao.com), and operated in Germany (ao.de) until July 2022 and in the Netherlands (ao.nl) until November 2019, specialising in household kitchen appliances, (such as washing machines, refrigerators, dishwashers and cookers) and other electricals. It is listed on the London Stock Exchange and is a constituent of the FTSE 250 Index.

== History ==
The company was founded under the name Appliances Online by John Roberts in 2000. Prior to this, during a conversation in a Bolton pub, a close friend bet Roberts £1 that he could not set up his own company and disrupt the white goods market by selling appliances online.

As well as selling directly to consumers, the company also sold kitchen appliances on behalf of other retailers such as Next, House of Fraser and B&Q. In 2009 the company acquired the distribution business Expert Logistics, enabling end-to-end control of their operation.

In 2013 Appliances Online rebranded to AO.com, which included a redesign of their logo to its current state.

In February 2014, the company was floated on the London Stock Exchange as AO World. The IPO allowed the company to raise funds for European expansion.

In 2015 AO.com announced plans for their second overseas website, AO.nl In the same year, a number of AO employees completed a Germany to Bolton bike ride to raise money for a new playground.

In 2016 to support its European expansion, AO opened its 84,000-square-metre (900,000 sq ft) headquarters in Bergheim, Germany.

In 2017 the company announced it would sponsor the 11th series of ITV show, Britain's Got Talent. It also announced that it would extend its sponsorship with Lancashire County Cricket Club. It was also reported that company founder, Roberts, would step down as CEO, remaining on the board as founder and executive director. The former COO, Steve Caunce, took over as CEO. In March, the company announced that it had raised £50 million through share placing to support plans for further growth. The retailer also announced that it was to open a recycling plant in Telford, Shropshire.

In January 2018, the retailer reported that it had opened a new office in Manchester city centre, which was to be home to the business's in-house multimedia, IT and sales teams. In April, the business announced that it had become one of only 20 businesses in the world to have received over 100,000 Trustpilot reviews. In July, the business launched its new brand campaign, Delivering Tomorrow. It was also reported that it had committed to building a second major fridge recycling facility in the south east of England. The company also confirmed that it had completed the acquisition of the online phone retailer Mobile Phones Direct for £32.5 million, as it looked to expand its offering in the mobile phone sector.

In January 2019, it was announced that Caunce would step down as CEO and Roberts would reassume the role.

AO's recycling plant in Telford processed its millionth fridge in July 2019.

AO Mobile launched in August 2019, offering all UK mobile networks and all handset manufacturers. Roberts described the launch as "a game changer for mobile phone customers".

In August 2019, AO launched AO Finance in partnership with consumer finance provider NewDay. AO Finance offers a rolling credit facility that gives customers access to essential products through affordable finance.

In October 2019, AO's plastic plant was unveiled as the company announced its ambition to use its recycling capabilities to ultimately make new fridges from the recycled materials extracted from old ones.

Announcing its interim financial results in November 2019, Roberts confirmed that AO would close its operation in the Netherlands to focus on its German business. Roberts explained that the team did not have the bandwidth to fix both markets but remained committed to future international expansion once the German model was proven.

In April 2020, AO Business continued to grow and after only six months in the housebuilders sector, secured over 12,000 building plots. Following a strategic review in July 2022, AO exited the housebuilder market to focus on business-to-business sectors that better fitted its model. This includes kitchen manufacturers and retailers, such as its partnership with Homebase, which launched in January 2022.

In September 2020, AO announced that it would be the new headline sponsor of Manchester Arena. The announcement came as operators ASM Global were submitting a planning application for phase one of its redevelopment. In a five-year deal, the rebranded AO Arena would see live events resuming once the COVID-19-related restrictions on venues were lifted.

In October 2020, AO announced plans to open five 'stores-within-a-store' with Tesco as part of a six-month partnership trial with the supermarket. It ended the trial in July 2022.

Following the launch of its Value Creation Plan in 2020, an all employee long-term incentive that rewards value creation, AO announced a restructuring of the plan in September 2022, which saw the scheme begin funding at a share price of £1.

In June 2022, AO closed its German business, which accounted for around 10% of the group's revenue. The following month, AO successfully completed a planned £40 million capital raise to strengthen its balance sheet and increase liquidity.

In Autumn 2022, AO appointed two new non-executive directors to its board. Former Pets at Home chief executive, Peter Pritchard, joined in September and Pret a Manger global chief digital officer Sarah Venning joined in November 2022.

At its half year financial results in November 2022, AO upgraded its full year profit expectations following its strategic pivot to focus on cash generation and profitability, which included reducing its cost base by £30 million.

In the same month, AO announced it was the new headline sponsor of Manchester Thunder, the current and four time Netball Super League champions.

AO announced in October 2024 that it would acquire musicMagpie, an online retailer that buys and sells refurbished electronics, for approximately £10 million, as part of expanding the firm's consumer tech businesses.

In June 2026, AO.com exceeded one million reviews on Trustpilot with an overall average rating of 4.9 out of 5.

AO Mobile, the company's mobile virtual network operator launched in August 2026.

== Operations ==
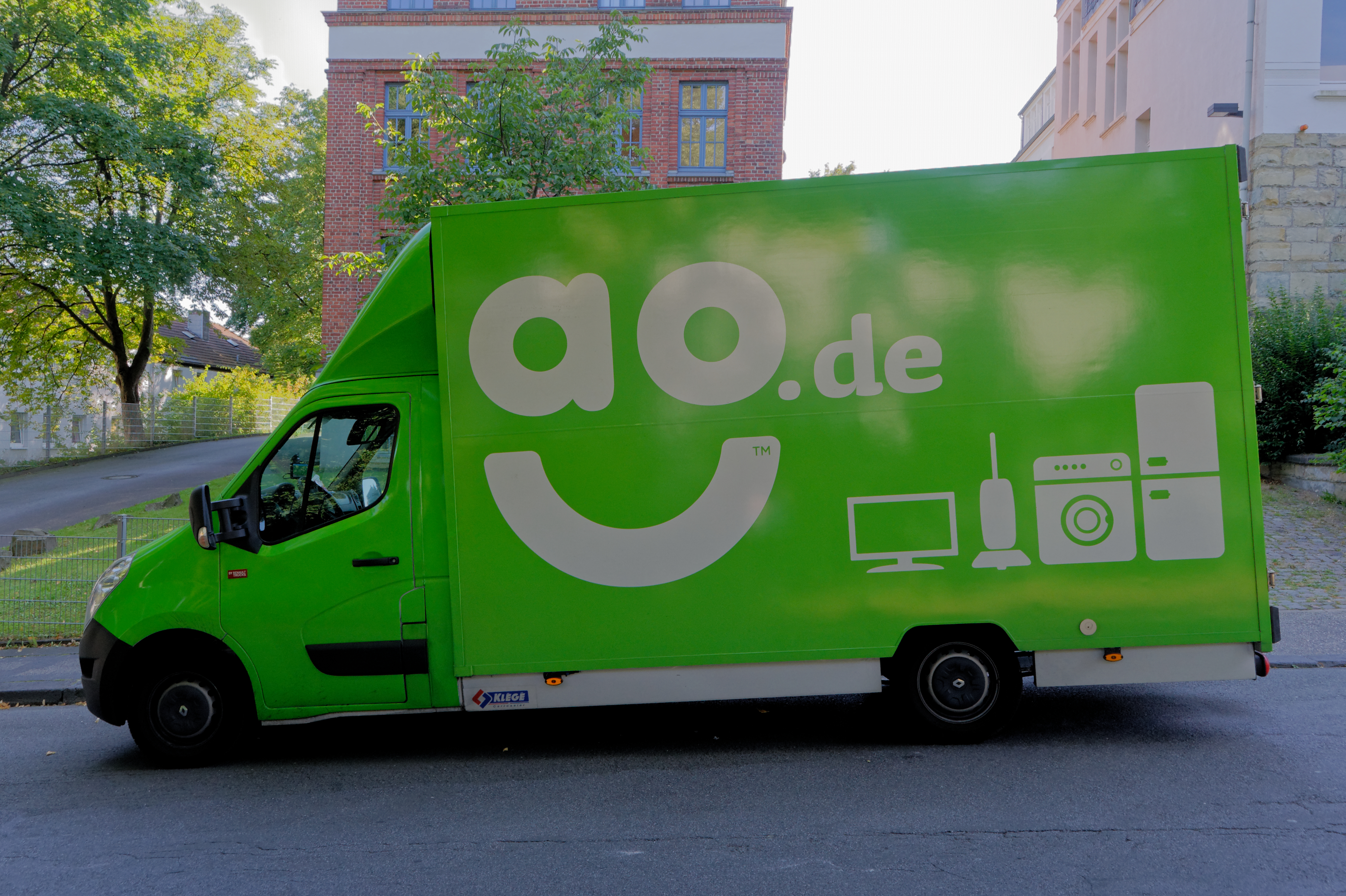
AO delivery vehicle

The company now occupies 50,000 sq ft (4,600 m^{2}) offices and is based in Bolton.

== Advertising ==
The company launched a new advertising campaign on 3 May 2013 to mark the rebranding of the business from Appliances Online to ao.com. The first advert follows a fictional new employee called 'Dave' and his over-enthusiastic inductor on his first day at work. A further advert was aired showing 'Barry Catchpole'. Its adverts feature a version of the Ramones song "Blitzkrieg Bop" in which the words "Hey! Ho! Let's go!" are reinterpreted as "A.O. Let's go!".

In May 2020, AO launched a new advertising campaign with an advert showing how Britain's homes were working harder than ever whilst many people were forced to stay home due to the COVID-19 pandemic. The advert demonstrated the hundreds of thousands of electricals AO have in stock ready for next day delivery across the UK.
