= Coat of arms =

Heraldic design on a shield, surcoat or tabard

A coat of arms is a heraldic visual design on an escutcheon (i.e., shield), surcoat, or tabard (the last two being outer garments), originating in Europe. The coat of arms on an escutcheon forms the central element of the full heraldic achievement, which in its whole consists of a shield, supporters, a crest, and a motto. A coat of arms is traditionally unique to the armiger (e.g. an individual person, family, state, organization, school or corporation). The term "coat of arms" itself, describing in modern times just the heraldic design, originates from the description of the entire medieval chainmail "surcoat" garment used in combat or preparation for the latter.

Rolls of arms are collections of many coats of arms, and since the early Modern Age centuries, they have been a source of information for public showing and tracing the membership of a noble family, and therefore its genealogy across time.

== History ==
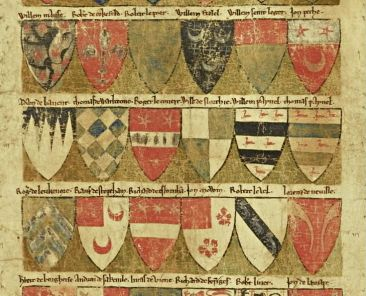
Coats of Arms in the Dering Roll, an English armorial from the 13th century

Heraldic designs came into general use among European nobility in the 12th century. Systematic, heritable heraldry had developed by the beginning of the 13th century. Exactly who had a right to use arms, by law or social convention, varied to some degree between countries. Early heraldic designs were personal, used by individual noblemen (who might also alter their chosen design over time). Arms became hereditary by the end of the 12th century, in England by the time of King Richard I during the Third Crusade (1189–1192).

Burgher arms were used in Northern Italy in the second half of the 14th century, and in the Holy Roman Empire by the mid 14th century. In the late medieval period, use of arms spread to the clergy, to towns as civic identifiers, and to royally chartered organizations such as universities and trading companies. The arts of vexillology and heraldry are closely related.

The term coat of arms itself in origin refers to the surcoat with heraldic designs worn by combatants, especially in the knightly tournament, in Old French cote a armer. The sense is transferred to the heraldic design itself in Middle English, in the mid-14th century.

Despite no common, enforceable widespread regulation, heraldry has remained consistent across Europe, where tradition alone has governed the design and use of arms. Some nations, such as England and Scotland, still maintain the same heraldic authorities which have traditionally granted and regulated arms for centuries and continue to do so in the present day. In England, for example, the granting of arms is and has been controlled by the College of Arms. Unlike seals and other general emblems, heraldic "achievements" have a formal description called a blazon, which uses vocabulary that allows for consistency in heraldic depictions. In the present day, coats of arms are still in use by a variety of institutions and individuals: for example, many European cities and universities have guidelines on how their coats of arms may be used, and protect their use as trademarks as any other unique identifier might be. Many societies exist that also aid in the design and registration of personal arms.

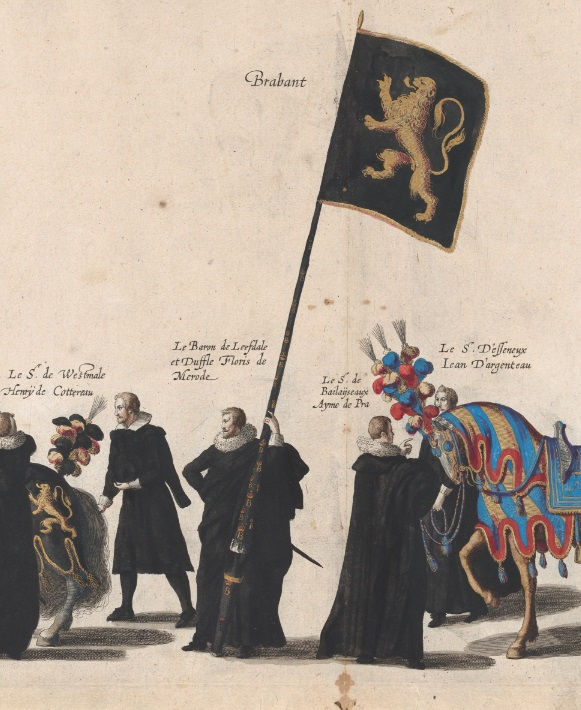
Brabant Lion held by Floris de Merode during the funeral of Albert VII, Archduke of Austria, print after design by Jacob Franquart

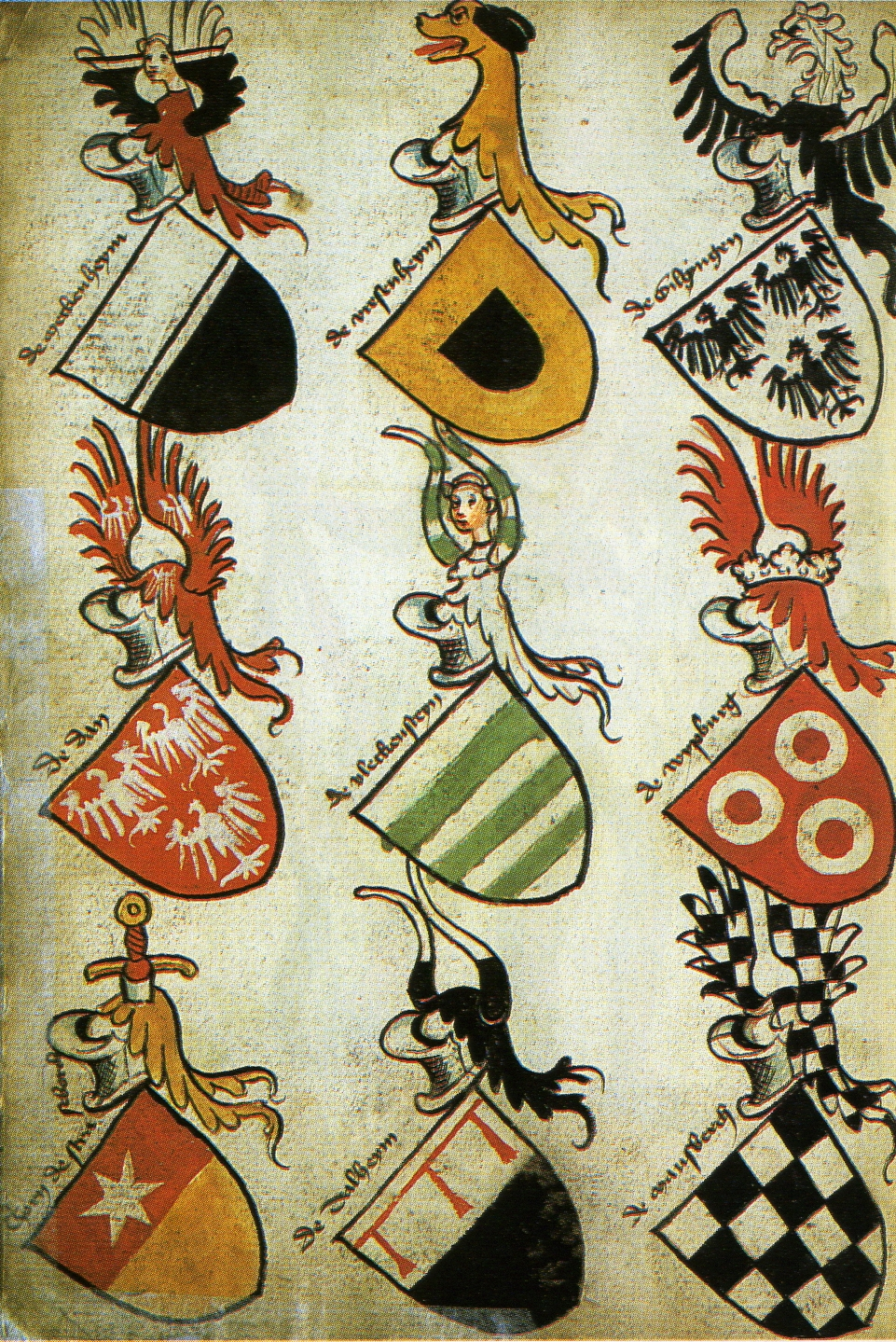
The German Hyghalmen Roll, c. late 15th century, illustrates the German practice of thematic repetition from the arms in the crest

Heraldry has been compared to modern corporate logos.

== Regional traditions ==
=== French heraldry ===
The French system of heraldry greatly influenced the British and Western European systems. Much of the terminology and classifications are taken from it. However, with the fall of the French monarchy (and later Empire) there is not currently a Fons Honorum (power to dispense and control honors) to strictly enforce heraldic law. The French Republics that followed have either merely affirmed pre-existing titles and honors or vigorously opposed noble privilege. Coats of arms are considered an intellectual property of a family or municipal body. Assumed arms (arms invented and used by the holder rather than granted by an authority) are considered valid unless they can be proved in court to copy that of an earlier holder.

=== British heraldry ===
Coat of arms of Richard of York, 3rd Duke of York, father of King Edward IV

In the heraldic traditions of England and Scotland, an individual, rather than a family, had a coat of arms. In those traditions coats of arms are legal property transmitted from father to son; wives and daughters could also bear arms modified to indicate their relation to the current holder of the arms. Undifferenced arms are used only by one person at any given time. Other descendants of the original bearer could bear the ancestral arms only with some difference: usually a colour change or the addition of a distinguishing charge. One such charge is the label, which in British usage (outside the Royal Family) is now always the mark of an heir apparent or (in Scotland) an heir presumptive. Because of their importance in identification, particularly in seals on legal documents, the use of arms was strictly regulated; few countries continue in this today. This has been carried out by heralds and the study of coats of arms is therefore called "heraldry". In time, the use of arms spread from military entities to educational institutes, and other establishments.

In Scotland, the Lord Lyon King of Arms has criminal jurisdiction to control the use of arms. In England, Northern Ireland and Wales the use of arms is a matter of civil law and regulated by the College of Arms and the High Court of Chivalry.

In reference to a dispute over the exercise of authority over the Officers of Arms in England, Arthur Annesley, 1st Earl of Anglesey, Lord Privy Seal, declared on 16 June 1673 that the powers of the Earl Marshal were "to order, judge, and determine all matters touching arms, ensigns of nobility, honour, and chivalry; to make laws, ordinances, and statutes for the good government of the Officers of Arms; to nominate Officers to fill vacancies in the College of Arms; to punish and correct Officers of Arms for misbehaviour in the execution of their places". It was further declared that no patents of arms or any ensigns of nobility should be granted and no augmentation, alteration, or addition should be made to arms without the consent of the Earl Marshal.

=== Irish heraldry ===
Arms of the Anglo-Irish House of Burgh

In Ireland the usage and granting of coats of arms was strictly regulated by the Ulster King of Arms from the office's creation in 1552. After Irish independence in 1922 the office was still functioning and working out of Dublin Castle. The last Ulster King of Arms was Sir Nevile Rodwell Wilkinson [Ulster King of Arms 1908–1940], who held it until his death in 1940. At the Irish government's request, no new King of Arms was appointed. Thomas Ulick Sadleir, the Deputy Ulster King of Arms, then became the Acting Ulster King of Arms. He served until the office was merged with that of Norroy King of Arms in 1943 and stayed on until 1944 to clear up the backlog.

An earlier Ireland King of Arms was created by King Richard II in 1392 and discontinued by King Henry VII in 1487. It did not grant many coats of arms – the few it did grant were annulled by the other Kings of Arms because they encroached upon their jurisdictions. Its purpose was supposedly to marshal an expedition to fully conquer Ireland that never materialized. Since 1 April 1943 the authority has been split between the Republic of Ireland and Northern Ireland. Heraldry in the Republic of Ireland is regulated by the Government of Ireland, by the Genealogical Office through the Office of the Chief Herald of Ireland. Heraldry in Northern Ireland is regulated by the British Government by the College of Arms through the Norroy and Ulster King of Arms.

=== German heraldry ===
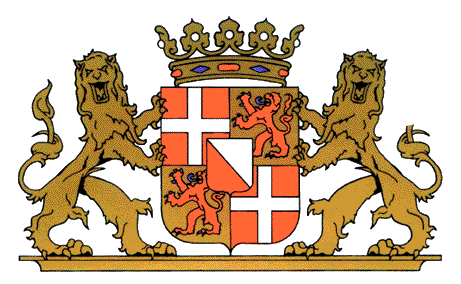
Coat of arms of the province of Utrecht, Netherlands

The heraldic tradition and style of modern and historic Germany and the Holy Roman Empire – including national and civic arms, noble and burgher arms, ecclesiastical heraldry, heraldic displays, and heraldic descriptions – stand in contrast to Gallo-British, Latin and Eastern heraldry, and strongly influenced the styles and customs of heraldry in the Nordic countries, which developed comparatively late.

=== Nordic heraldry ===
In the Nordic countries, provinces, regions, cities, and municipalities have coats of arms. These are posted at the borders and on buildings containing official offices, as well as used in official documents and on the uniforms of municipal officers. Arms may also be used on souvenirs or other effects, given that an application has been granted by the municipal council.

=== Other national traditions ===
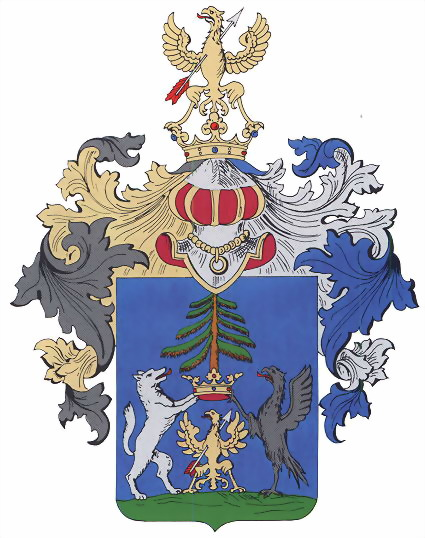
Coat of arms of Liptov County in Slovakia

At a national level, "coats of arms" were generally retained by European states with constitutional continuity of more than a few centuries, including constitutional monarchies like Denmark as well as old republics like San Marino and Switzerland.

In Italy the use of coats of arms was only loosely regulated by the states existing before the unification of 1861. Since the Consulta Araldica, the college of arms of the Kingdom of Italy, was abolished in 1948, personal coats of arms and titles of nobility, though not outlawed, are not recognised.

In Africa, both the College of Arms of Kenya and the South African Bureau of Heraldry grant arms.

Coats of arms in Spain were generally left up to the owner themselves, but the design was based on military service and the heritage of their grandparents. In France, the coat of arms is based on the Fleur-de-lys and the Rule of Tinctures used in English heraldry as well.

=== North American ===
==== Canada ====
The monarch of Canada's prerogative to grant armorial bearings has been delegated to the Governor General of Canada. Canada has its own Chief Herald and Herald Chancellor. The Canadian Heraldic Authority, the governmental agency which is responsible for creating arms and promoting Canadian heraldry, is situated at Rideau Hall.

==== United States ====
The Great Seal of the United States, which displays as its central design the heraldic device of the nation.

The Great Seal of the United States uses on the obverse as its central motif a heraldic achievement described as being the arms of the nation. The seal, and the armorial bearings, were adopted by the Continental Congress on 20 June 1782, and is a shield divided palewise into thirteen pieces, with a blue chief, which is displayed upon the breast of an American bald eagle. The crest is thirteen stars breaking through a glory and clouds, displayed with no helm, torse, or mantling (unlike most European precedents at the time). Many of the American states have adopted their own coats of arms, which usually designed as part of the respective state's seal. Vermont has both a state seal and a state coat of arms that are independent of one another (though both contain a pine tree, a cow and sheaves of grain); the seal is used to authenticate documents, whilst the heraldic device represents the state itself.

== Ecclesiastic heraldry ==
The coat of arms of Pope John Paul I displays the papal tiara and crossed keys of the pontifical office.

The Vatican City State and the Holy See each have their own coat of arms. As the papacy is not hereditary, its occupants display their personal arms combined with those of their office. Some popes came from armigerous (noble) families; others adopted coats of arms during their career in the Church. The latter typically allude to their ideal of life, or to specific pontifical programmes. A well-known and widely displayed example in recent times was Pope John Paul II's arms. His selection of a large letter M (for the Virgin Mary) was intended to express the message of his strong Marian devotion. Roman Catholic dioceses are also each assigned a coat of arms, as are basilicas or papal churches, the latter usually displaying these on the building. These may be used in countries which otherwise do not use heraldic devices. In countries like Scotland with a strong statutory heraldic authority, arms will need to be officially granted and recorded.

== Flags and banners ==
Flags are used to identify ships (where they are called ensigns), embassies and such, and they use the same colors and designs found in heraldry, but they are not usually considered to be heraldic. A country may have both a national flag and a national coat of arms, and the two may not look alike at all. For example, the flag of Scotland (St Andrew's Cross) has a white saltire on a blue field, but the royal arms of Scotland has a red lion within a double tressure on a gold (or) field.

== Modern national emblems ==
Egyptian coats of arms from the late monarchical, and early republican periods showing common Near and Middle Eastern motifs, namely the crescent and stars which are symbols of the region's predominant religion, Islam, and the Eagle of Saladin

Among the states led by worker's parties, emblems resembling those of the Soviet states were adopted in all the Warsaw Pact states except Czechoslovakia and Poland. Since 1986–1989, some of the ex-socialist states, such as Russia, have reused their original pre-revolutionary heraldry, often with only the symbols of monarchy removed. Other countries such as Belarus have retained their soviet coats of arms or at least kept some of the old heraldry.

With the independence of the modern nation states of the Arab World from the First World War onwards, European traditions of heraldry were partially adopted for state emblems. These emblems often involve the star and crescent symbol taken from the Ottoman flag. Other commonly seen symbols are birds, chiefly the Eagle of Saladin, and the Hawk of Quraish. These symbols can be found on the coat of arms of Egypt, and Syria, amongst others.

Sub-Saharan African flags and emblems after decolonisation often chose emblems based on regional traditions or wildlife. Symbols of a ritual significance according to local custom were generally favoured, such as the leopard in the arms of Benin, Malawi, Somalia, the Democratic Republic of the Congo and, in the form of the black panther, of Gabon.

In Kenya, the Swahili word Harambee (lit. 'Let us come together') is used as a motto in the country's coat of arms. In Botswana and Lesotho, meanwhile, the word Pula (lit. 'Rain') is used in like fashion.

In the coat of arms of Eswatini, a lion and an elephant serve as supporters. They are each intended to represent the king and the queen mother respectively, the nation's joint heads of state.

== Comparable traditions outside of Europe ==
Imperial Seal of Japan

Japanese emblems, called kamon (often abbreviated "mon"), are family badges which often date back to the 7th century, and are used in Japan today. The Japanese tradition is independent of the European, but many abstract and floral elements are used.

== See also ==
- Arms of assumption
- Armorial of UK universities
- Baron and feme
- Gallery of country coats of arms
- List of coats of arms
- National emblem
- Officer of arms
- Seal
- Siebmachers Wappenbuch (coats of arms from German-speaking regions)
