= Bolton School =

Independent day school in Greater Manchester, England

Location
- Chorley New Road; Bolton, BL1 4PA; England; 53.579868°N 2.454865°W

Information
- Type: Private day school
- Religious affiliation: None
- Established: ante 1516; 510 years ago
- Founder: Viscount Leverhulme
- Chair of Governors: Ian Riley
- Head of Foundation: Philip Britton
- Staff: c. 450
- Gender: Co-educational nursery and infant school, boys and girls junior schools and senior schools
- Age: 0 to 18
- Enrolment: c. 2,500
- Colours: Bolton School/Infants Blue. Boys' Division Navy Blue. Girls' Division Maroon.
- Publication: The Boltonian, Girls' Division Magazine/Spirit, the Bugle, Old Girls' Newsletter, Primary Division Review
- Head of Boys' Division: Nic Ford
- Head of Girls' Division: Lynne Kyle
- Head of Primary Division: Sue Faulkner
- Motto: Both Divisions:Mutare Vel Timere Sperno (I scorn to change or to fear) Girls' Division Prayer: Much is required of those to whom much is given
- Former pupils: Old Girls' Association and Old Boltonians' Association
- Website: www.boltonschool.org

Bolton School is a private day school in Bolton, Greater Manchester. It comprises a co-educational nursery (ages 0–4), co-educational infant school (ages 3–7), single sex junior schools (ages 7–11) and single sex senior schools including sixth forms (ages 11–18). With over 2,500 pupils, it is one of the largest independent day schools in the country.a

== History ==
=== Early history ===
Established as Bolton Grammar School, it is not known exactly when the boys' school was founded although it is recorded in 1516. In 1525, William Shaw of Wigan sold land worth 33s 4d p.a. towards the maintenance of a schoolmaster to teach grammar in Bolton. In 1644, it was endowed by Robert Lever and so began the start of a long relationship with the Lever name. During the 17th century, the school moved from its original Tudor building to new premises beside the Parish Church in Bolton.

Bolton Girls' Day School was established on 1 October 1877 as one of the earliest public day schools for girls in the country. The schoolroom was in the Mechanics' Institute, and the first intake was 22 girls. The school was renamed Bolton High School for Girls and moved to the Park Road site in 1891. Its new building was opened by the suffragist Mrs Millicent Fawcett and the school had 67 girls on roll.

In 1899 Bolton Grammar School for Boys moved to its current location on Chorley New Road shortly after its amalgamation with Bolton High School for Boys. The move was made possible by Sir William Hesketh Lever. He had agreed to put up £5,000 and to be co-opted as a governor of the school in 1898 and a year later bought the freehold at Westbourne and offered it the school. He also financed the necessary building alternations. The school remained in these premises at Westbourne until 1932.

In 1906, Bolton High School for Girls and its headmistress, Olivia Dymond, were congratulated by inspectors for "exercising a good influence on the girlhood of Bolton, not only intellectually but in other ways, not less important in the formation of their characters." School uniform and compulsory games were introduced during Miss Dymond's tenure as headmistress.

=== The New Foundation ===
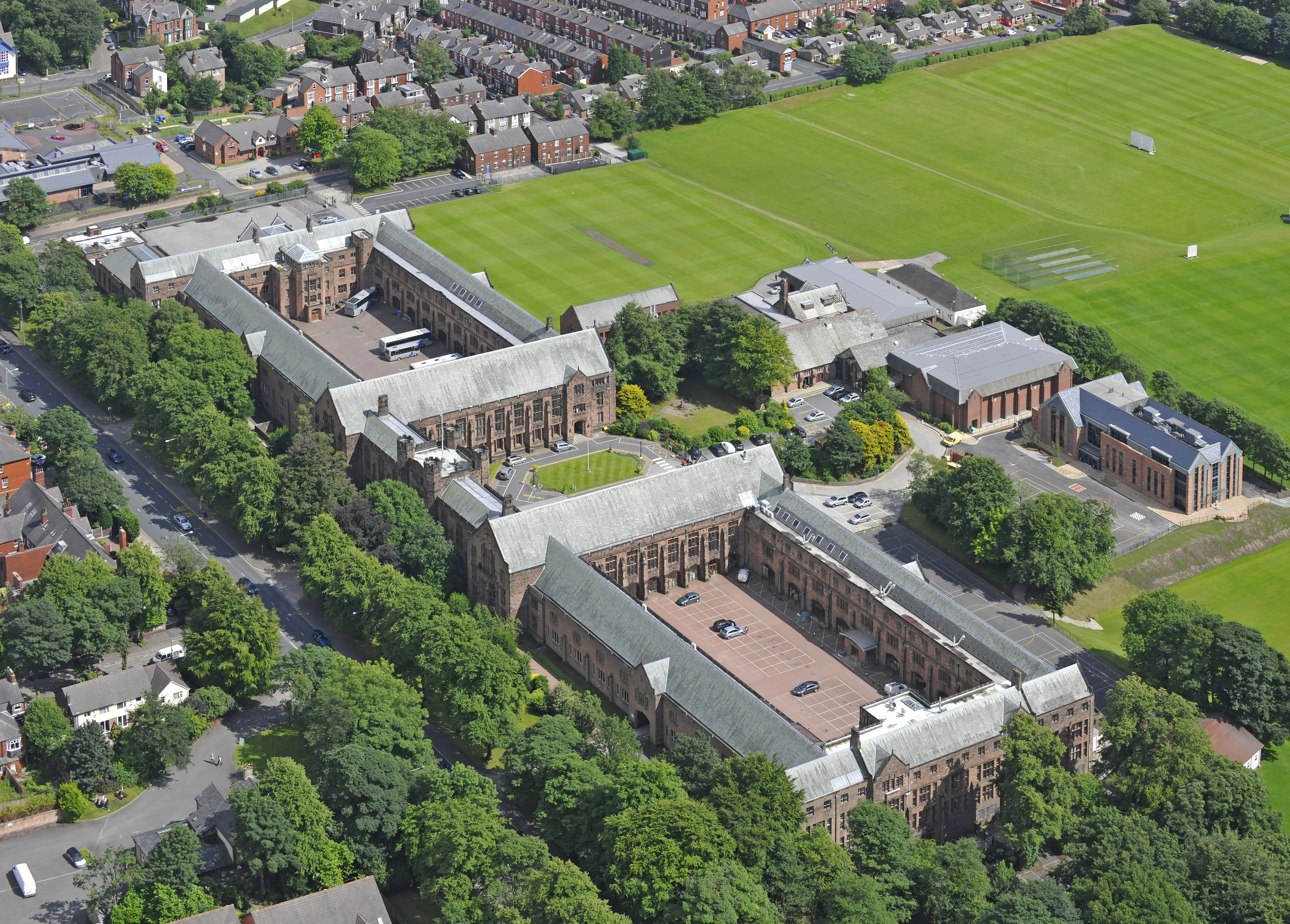
Aerial photo of the school (2010)

In 1913, Sir William Hesketh Lever jointly endowed the Bolton Grammar School and the Bolton High School for Girls, on condition that they should be equal partners known as Bolton School (Girls' Division and Boys' Division). On 1 April 1915, the Bolton School Foundation formally came into existence.

Construction of the Boys' Division and Girls' Division buildings began in 1924. In the same year, the school was granted a coat of arms. The Boys' Junior School was established at Broomfield on Chorley New Road in 1928 and in 1938, the school moved to the Park Road site where the Bolton High School for Girls had once been situated. The 1950s saw the creation of a new sports level and the building of the Tillotson Pavilion, and a grant from the Industrial Society funded the construction of a new Boys' Division chemistry block which opened in 1958. The main wings of the Boys' Division and Girls' Division were completed in 1965 realising Lord Leverhulme's plan to have purpose-built school buildings.

=== Modern history ===
In 1982, the Leverhulme Pavilion at Oldfield was opened by Philip Lever, 3rd Viscount Leverhulme, Lord Leverhulme's grandson. Other additions to the school's facilities include the sports complex and swimming pool in 1986; the Arts & Conference Centre, opened by Diana, Princess of Wales in 1993; and Patterdale Hall, an outdoor pursuits centre at the southern end of Ullswater in the Lake District.

In 2008, the school began a £19m expansion and renovation project which saw the construction of a new Infant School (Beech House), a new Junior Girls' School (Hesketh House) and the refurbishment and extension of the Junior Boys' School (Park Road). After ten years planning, building work began on the £7million co-educational Riley Sixth Form Centre in the Summer of 2012 and the facility was ready for use in the Autumn Term 2013. The Riley Centre was named after its lead benefactor Ian Riley who was a pupil from 1974 to 1981. It stands where Leverhulme envisaged a chapel and has been described as a secular and modern interpretation of the original plan uniting the Girls' and Boys' Divisions.

In 2025, the school proposed a multi-use sports dome in partnership with CopriSystems, with plans to open in 2027.

== Extra-curricular activities ==
The school has over 100 clubs and activities for pupils to take part in at lunchtimes and after school, in addition to orchestras, choirs and sports teams. The Boys' Division has a strong sporting heritage, with in-school trophies for football, cricket and gymnastics dating back 100 years. The school also takes part in regional and national schools' competitions and has a good reputation at these levels.

Pupils are given the opportunity to complete their Bronze, Silver and Gold Duke of Edinburgh's Award. In Year 11, pupils are encouraged to take part in National Citizen Service, which feeds into the Sixth Form Community Action scheme. Both schemes encourage pupils to give their time to their local communities.

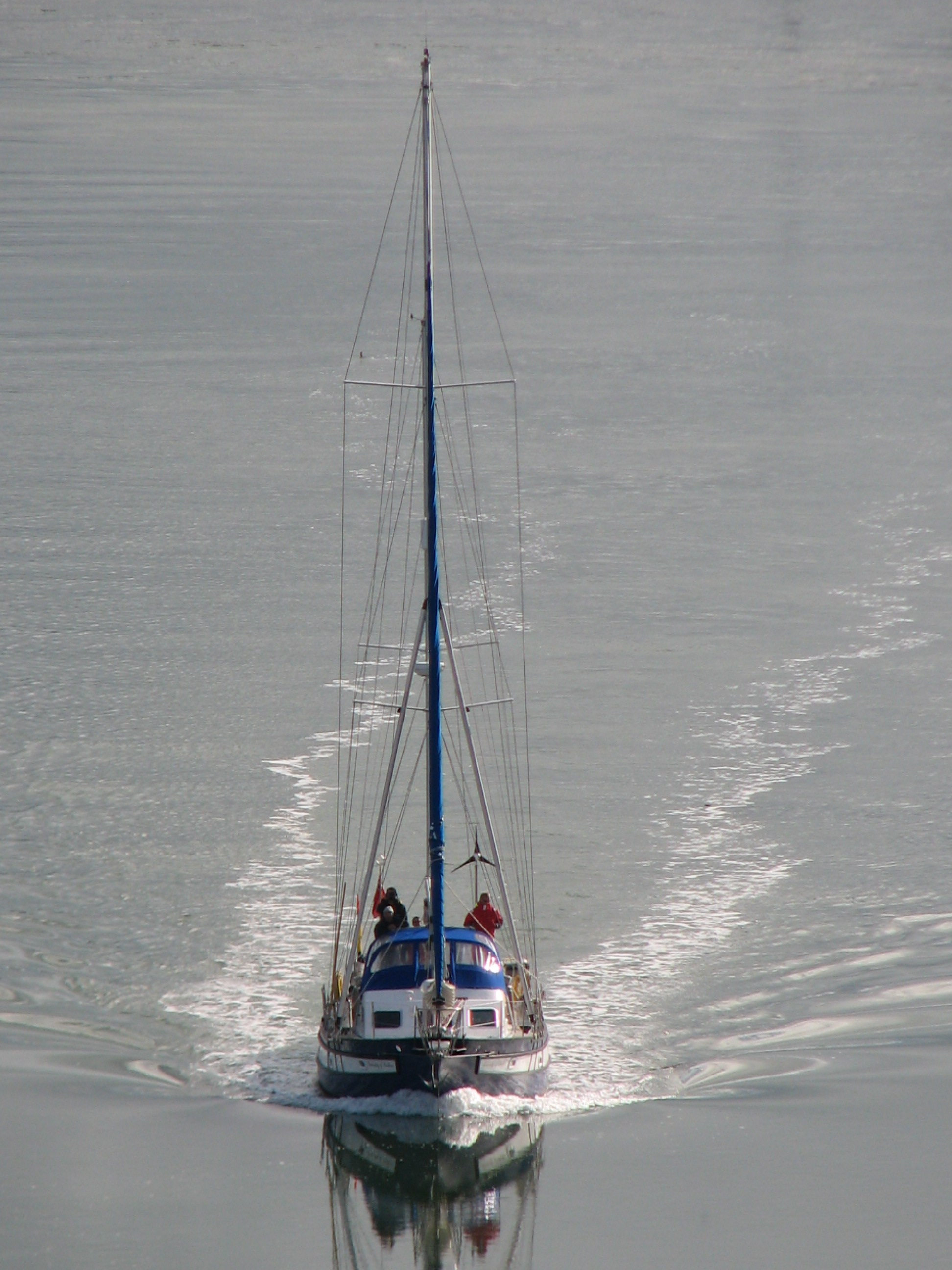
The "Tenacity of Bolton" ketch, built by Bolton School pupils

=== Outdoor pursuits ===
The school maintains an outdoor pursuits department and operates Patterdale Hall, a residential outdoor pursuits centre on the shores of Lake Ullswater in the Lake District. Pupils gain experience of the world of business and commerce through the 'Business Awareness' course held at Patterdale Hall.

The Boys' Division Senior School and Boys' Junior School offer annual residential outdoor pursuits trips to Patterdale Hall to all age groups, from Year 4 to Year 13. The Girls' Division Senior School and Girls' Junior School also offer these trips to selected year groups from Year 5 and up. The team at Patterdale Hall, alongside outdoor education staff based in Bolton, assists girls and boys in achieving the expedition part of their Duke of Edinburgh's Award.

Between 1999 and 2007, Boys' Division pupils constructed a concrete yacht during Technology lessons and lunchtimes as a millennium project ("The Third Millennium Ketch"). It was launched in May 2007. Named "Tenacity of Bolton", the ketch allowed Year 8 and 9 pupils the chance for sailing voyages in the Irish Sea. In September 2014, "Tenacity of Bolton" was gifted to the Tall Ships Youth Trust to be operated by the Trust, with Bolton School pupils continuing to make use of the ketch.

== Coat of arms and motto ==
Coat of arms of Bolton School (Boys' Division)
Notes Granted 6 September 1923. Crest On a wreath Argent and Sable, Between two sprigs of laurel a cock statant Proper, combed and wattled Gules, facing the dexter on a trumpet Or facing the sinister. Escutcheon Argent, two bends Sable, the upper engrailed; on a chief of the second between a rose and a chaplet Or an open book Proper. Motto 'Mutare vel timere sperno'

The school coat of arms was granted to the Boys' Division in 1923. The devices of two black diagonal stripes, the edges of the upper one scalloped, on a silver shield together with the cock and bugle crest have been used by the Lever families of Great, Little and Darcy Lever since the Middle Ages. The cock and bugle are heraldic puns: the Lever name transposes to "se lever" in Norman French, the language of heraldry, which means "to arise"; the cock is the bird whose crow causes the world to arise, while the trumpet sounds "Reveille".

In order for the school to differentiate itself, additional appropriate symbols were added:

- Gold Rose of Lancaster: appears in gold rather than red to abide by the Rule of Tincture and also to make it stand out against the black background
- Open Book: frequently found in the heraldry of academic institutions to represent learning
- Gold Chaplet of Roses: again in gold to abide by the Rule of Tincture, this signifies honour and also the Hulme family. Lord Leverhulme also used this charge (albeit in red) on his mayoral arms.

Arms of Bolton School (Girls' Division)

The Girls' Division was given permission to display the same arms on a lozenge (i.e. diamond) surmounted by a true-lovers' knot. The Girls' Division does not make use of the crest. This is unusual in heraldry; although unmarried ladies' parental coats of arms would be displayed in this manner, female institutions such as convents normally utilise a shield.

The school's motto is Mutare Vel Timere Sperno, meaning "I scorn to change or to fear". This is used exclusively by the Boys' Division.

== Former pupils ==
Bolton School's alumni are known as Old Girls and Old Boys. Former Boys' Division pupils are also known as Old Boltonians.

There is an Old Girls' and Old Boys' Association.

The school's Old Boys run and take part in three sports clubs: The Old Boltonians AFC, the Old Boltonians' Golf Society, and the Old Boltonians' Rugby Union Football Club. Membership is open to all former pupils and staff.

For details of notable former pupils please see the List of people educated at Bolton School.

== See also ==
- Listed buildings in Bolton
