= List of University of Oxford people in British public life =

This is a list of University of Oxford people in British public life. Many were students at one (or more) of the colleges of the University, and others held fellowships at a college.

This list forms part of a series of lists of people associated with the University of Oxford – for other lists, please see the main article List of University of Oxford people.

== Monarchs ==
Name	College	Years	Reign	Ref
King Edward VII	Christ Church	1859–1860	King of the United Kingdom of Great Britain and Ireland 1901–1910	
King Edward VIII	Magdalen	1912–1914	King of the United Kingdom of Great Britain and Northern Ireland 1936	

== Royal persons ==
Name	College	Years at Oxford	Ref
Prince Leopold, Duke of Albany	Christ Church	1872–1876	
George, Marquess of Cambridge (formerly Prince George of Teck)	Magdalen		
Prince Christian Victor of Schleswig-Holstein	Magdalen		
Edward Windsor, Lord Downpatrick	Keble	2007–	
Lord Frederick Windsor	Magdalen	1998–2002	
Lord Nicholas Windsor	Manchester		

== Prime ministers ==
Name	College	Student at Oxford	Period as Prime Minister	Ref
Spencer Compton, 1st Earl of Wilmington	Trinity	1690–?	1742–1743	
Henry Pelham	Hart Hall	1710–?	1743–1746	
George Grenville	Christ Church	1730–1733	1763–1765	
William Pitt, 1st Earl of Chatham	Trinity	1727–1728	1766–1768	
Frederick North, Lord North (later 2nd Earl of Guilford)	Trinity	1748–1750	1770–1782	
William Petty, 2nd Earl of Shelburne	Christ Church	1755–1757	1782–1783	
William Cavendish-Bentinck, 3rd Duke of Portland	Christ Church	1755–1757	1783, 1807–1809	
Henry Addington (later 1st Viscount Sidmouth)	Brasenose	1774–1778	1801–1804	
William Wyndham Grenville, 1st Baron Grenville	Christ Church	1776–1780	1806–1807	
Robert Jenkinson, 2nd Earl of Liverpool	Christ Church	1787–1790	1812–1827	
George Canning	Christ Church	1787–1791	1827	
Sir Robert Peel, Bt	Christ Church	1805–1808	1834–1835, 1841–1846	
Edward Smith-Stanley, 14th Earl of Derby	Christ Church	1817–1820	1852, 1858–1859, 1866–1868	
William Ewart Gladstone	Christ Church	1828–1831	1868–1874, 1880–1885, 1886, 1892–1894	
Robert Gascoyne-Cecil, 3rd Marquess of Salisbury	Christ Church	1847–1849	1885–1886, 1886–1892, 1895–1902	
Archibald Primrose, 5th Earl of Rosebery	Christ Church	1866–1869	1894–1895	
H. H. Asquith (later 1st Earl of Oxford and Asquith)	Balliol	1870–1874	1908–1916	
Clement Attlee (later 1st Earl Attlee)	University	1901–1904	1945–1951	
Anthony Eden (later 1st Earl of Avon)	Christ Church	1919–1922	1955–1957	
Harold Macmillan (later 1st Earl of Stockton)	Balliol	1912–1914	1957–1963	
Sir Alexander Douglas-Home (formerly 14th Earl of Home, later Baron Home of the Hirsel)	Christ Church	1922–1925	1963–1964	
Harold Wilson (later Baron Wilson of Rievaulx)	Jesus	1934–1937	1964–1970, 1974–1976	
Edward Heath	Balliol	1935–1939	1970–1974	
Margaret Thatcher (later Baroness Thatcher)	Somerville	1943–1947	1979–1990	
Tony Blair	St John's	1972–1975	1997–2007	
David Cameron (later Baron Cameron of Chipping Norton)	Brasenose	1985–1988	2010–2016	
Theresa May	St Hugh's	1974–1977	2016–2019	
Boris Johnson	Balliol	1983–1987	2019–2022	
Liz Truss	Merton	1993-1996	2022	
Rishi Sunak	Lincoln	1998-2001	2022–2024	
Keir Starmer	St Edmund Hall	1986	2024–2026	

== Cabinet of the United Kingdom (at 12 December 2023) ==
Name	College	Years at Oxford	Title	Ref
Rishi Sunak	Lincoln	1998-2001	Prime Minister; First Lord of the Treasury; Minister for the Union; Minister for the Civil Service	
Jeremy Hunt	Magdalen		Chancellor of the Exchequer; Second Lord of the Treasury	
David Cameron	Brasenose	1985–1988	Secretary of State for Foreign, Commonwealth and Development Affairs	
Alex Chalk	Magdalen		Secretary of State for Justice; Lord High Chancellor of Great Britain	
Michael Gove	Lady Margaret Hall	1985–1988	Secretary of State for Levelling Up, Housing and Communities; Minister for Intergovernmental Relations	
Thérèse Coffey	Somerville	1989–1991	Secretary of State for Environment, Food and Rural Affairs	
Mel Stride	St Edmund Hall		Secretary of State for Work and Pensions	
Mark Harper	Brasenose		Secretary of State for Transport	
John Glen	Mansfield		Chief Secretary to the Treasury	
Jeremy Quin	Hertford		Minister for the Cabinet Office; Paymaster General	

== Shadow Cabinet of the United Kingdom (at 9 May 2023) ==
Name	College	Years at Oxford	Title	Ref
Keir Starmer	St Edmund Hall		Leader of the Opposition; Leader of the Labour Party	
Rachel Reeves	New		Shadow Chancellor of the Exchequer	
Yvette Cooper	Balliol		Shadow Secretary of State for the Home Department	
Ed Miliband	Corpus Christi		Shadow Secretary of State for Climate Change and Net Zero	
Nick Thomas-Symonds	St Edmund Hall	1998–2001	Shadow Secretary of State for International Trade	
Bridget Phillipson	Hertford		Shadow Secretary of State for Education	
Lucy Powell	Somerville		Shadow Secretary of State for Digital, Culture, Media and Sport	
Anneliese Dodds	St. Hilda's		Shadow Secretary of State for Women and Equalities; Chair of the Labour Party	
Shabana Mahmood	Lincoln		Labour Party National Campaign Coordinator	
Thangam Debbonaire			Shadow Leader of the House of Commons	

== House of Lords and House of Commons ==
Peers and members of the House of Commons who are better known for their endeavours outside politics are listed in the appropriate category (e.g. the jurist William Blackstone, cricketer Colin Cowdrey, historian Edward Gibbon, scientists Susan Greenfield and Robert May, physician and journalist Thomas Stuttaford, and philosopher Mary Warnock).

Hereditary peers

In order of precedence. See also Lords of Appeal in Ordinary and other legal peers.

Name	College	Years at Oxford	Notes	Ref
Edward Fitzalan-Howard, 18th Duke of Norfolk	Lincoln		Earl Marshal of England	
Edward Seymour, 12th Duke of Somerset	Christ Church	1823	Left without taking degree	
Charles Gordon-Lennox, 6th Duke of Richmond	Christ Church	–1839		
Henry Somerset, 6th Duke of Beaufort	Trinity			
Francis Osborne, 5th Duke of Leeds	Christ Church	1767–1773		
William Russell, 1st Duke of Bedford	Magdalen			
William Russell, 8th Duke of Bedford	Christ Church			
George Russell, 10th Duke of Bedford	Balliol			
Hastings Russell, 12th Duke of Bedford	Balliol	1907–1911		
Peregrine Cavendish, 12th Duke of Devonshire	Exeter			
George Spencer-Churchill, 5th Duke of Marlborough	Christ Church	–1786	DCL 1792	
George Spencer-Churchill, 6th Duke of Marlborough	Christ Church			
John Spencer-Churchill, 7th Duke of Marlborough	Oriel		MP 1844–1845 and 1847–1857, Ld Steward 1866–1867, Ld Press of the Council 1867–1868, Ld Lt of Ireland 1876–1880, of Oxfordshire 1857–1883	
James Hamilton, 1st Duke of Hamilton	Exeter			
James Hamilton, 5th Duke of Hamilton	Christ Church			
James Hamilton, 6th Duke of Hamilton	St Mary's Hall			
William Hamilton, 11th Duke of Hamilton	Christ Church			
William Douglas-Hamilton, 12th Duke of Hamilton	Christ Church			
Douglas Douglas-Hamilton, 14th Duke of Hamilton	Balliol			
Angus Douglas-Hamilton, 15th Duke of Hamilton	Balliol			
William Montagu-Douglas-Scott, 6th Duke of Buccleuch	Christ Church			
Walter Montagu-Douglas-Scott, 8th Duke of Buccleuch	Christ Church			
John Scott, 9th Duke of Buccleuch	Christ Church			
Richard Scott, 10th Duke of Buccleuch	Christ Church	1976 BA	President of the National Trust for Scotland, appointed KBE for services to the Millennium Commission	
George Murray, 10th Duke of Atholl				
Angus Graham, 7th Duke of Montrose	Christ Church			
Peregrine Bertie, 2nd Duke of Ancaster and Kesteven				
Henry Percy, 11th Duke of Northumberland	Christ Church			
George Montagu, 1st Duke of Montagu	The Queen's			
James Hamilton, 1st Duke of Abercorn	Christ Church			
James Hamilton, 2nd Duke of Abercorn	Christ Church			
Valerian Wellesley, 8th Duke of Wellington	New College			
Richard Temple-Grenville, 3rd Duke of Buckingham and Chandos	Christ Church			
George Nugent-Temple-Grenville, 1st Marquess of Buckingham	Christ Church			
James Gascoyne-Cecil, 4th Marquess of Salisbury	University			
Robert Gascoyne-Cecil, 7th Marquess of Salisbury	Christ Church			
John Thynne, 4th Marquess of Bath	Christ Church			
Thomas Thynne, 5th Marquess of Bath	Balliol			
Henry Thynne, 6th Marquess of Bath	Christ Church			
Alexander Thynn, 7th Marquess of Bath	Christ Church			
Richard Wellesley, 1st Marquess Wellesley	Christ Church			
Henry Paget, 1st Marquess of Anglesey	Christ Church			
James Broun-Ramsay, 1st Marquess of Dalhousie	Christ Church			
Basil Hamilton-Temple-Blackwood, 4th Marquess of Dufferin and Ava	Balliol			
Sheridan Hamilton-Temple-Blackwood, 5th Marquess of Dufferin and Ava	Christ Church			
David Gordon, 4th Marquess of Aberdeen and Temair	Balliol			
Sidney Herbert, 14th Earl of Pembroke	Christ Church			
William Courtenay, 11th Earl of Devon	Christ Church			
Anthony Ashley-Cooper, 1st Earl of Shaftesbury	Exeter			
Anthony Ashley-Cooper, 7th Earl of Shaftesbury	Christ Church			
William Legge, 6th Earl of Dartmouth	Christ Church			
John Carteret, 2nd Earl Granville	Christ Church			
Heneage Finch, 1st Earl of Aylesford	Christ Church			
Charles Bennet, 6th Earl of Tankerville	Christ Church			
James Stanhope, 1st Earl Stanhope	Trinity			
George Waldegrave, 7th Earl Waldegrave	Christ Church			
Gerard Wallop, 9th Earl of Portsmouth	Balliol			
Herbrand Sackville, 9th Earl De La Warr	Magdalen			
James Brudenell, 7th Earl of Cardigan	Christ Church			
Edward Hyde, 1st Earl of Clarendon	Hertford			
Edward Hyde, 3rd Earl of Clarendon				
Henry Hyde, 4th Earl of Clarendon				
George Howard, 7th Earl of Carlisle	Christ Church			
William Murray, 8th Earl of Mansfield and Mansfield	Christ Church			
Henry Herbert, 4th Earl of Carnarvon				
James Harris, 1st Earl of Malmesbury				
James Howard Harris, 3rd Earl of Malmesbury	Oriel	1825–1827		
David Douglas-Home, 15th Earl of Home	Christ Church			
James Bruce, 8th Earl of Elgin	Christ Church			
Edward Pakenham, 6th Earl of Longford	Christ Church			
Francis Pakenham, 7th Earl of Longford	New College and Christ Church			
Thomas Pakenham, 8th Earl of Longford	Magdalen			
William Howard, 8th Earl of Wicklow	Magdalen and St Stephen's House			
John FitzGibbon, 2nd Earl of Clare	Christ Church			
Nathaniel Clements, 2nd Earl of Leitrim	Oriel			
Du Pré Alexander, 2nd Earl of Caledon	Christ Church			
James Alexander, 3rd Earl of Caledon	Christ Church			
James Alexander, 4th Earl of Caledon	Christ Church			
William Hare, 5th Earl of Listowel	Balliol			
Richard Onslow, 5th Earl of Onslow	New College			
Michael Onslow, 7th Earl of Onslow				
Edmond Pery, 5th Earl of Limerick	New College			
Gilbert Elliot-Murray-Kynynmound, 1st Earl of Minto	Christ Church			
Edward Eliot, 3rd Earl of St Germans	Christ Church			
Frederick Lygon, 6th Earl Beauchamp	Christ Church			
Frederick Curzon, 7th Earl Howe	Christ Church			
William Amherst, 1st Earl Amherst	Christ Church			
Frederick Campbell, 3rd Earl Cawdor	Christ Church			
John Ward, 1st Earl of Dudley				
Granville Leveson-Gower, 2nd Earl Granville	Christ Church			
George Eden, 1st Earl of Auckland	Christ Church			
George Byng, 3rd Earl of Strafford	Christ Church			
Charles Canning, 1st Earl Canning	Christ Church			
John Wodehouse, 1st Earl of Kimberley	Christ Church			
William Palmer, 2nd Earl of Selborne	University			
Roundell Palmer, 3rd Earl of Selborne	University			
Thomas George Baring, 1st Earl of Northbrook	Christ Church			
Stafford Northcote, 1st Earl of Iddesleigh	Balliol			
John Campbell, 3rd Earl of Breadalbane and Holland	Christ Church			
Thomas Brassey, 1st Earl Brassey	University			
Thomas Brassey, 2nd Earl Brassey	Balliol			
Robert Reid, 1st Earl Loreburn	Balliol			
Michael Hicks-Beach, 1st Earl St Aldwyn	Christ Church			
Douglas Haig, 1st Earl Haig	Brasenose	1880–	Qualified for, but did not take, a pass degree	
George Haig, 2nd Earl Haig				
St John Brodrick, 1st Earl of Midleton	Balliol			
F. E. Smith, 1st Earl of Birkenhead	Wadham			
Edward Wood, 1st Earl of Halifax	Christ Church			
Alexander Ruthven, 2nd Earl of Gowrie	Balliol			
A. V. Alexander, 1st Earl Alexander of Hillsborough	Magdalen			
William Fiennes, 1st Viscount Saye and Sele	New College			
Hugh Gough, 3rd Viscount Gough				
Hugh Gough, 4th Viscount Gough	New College			
Robert Lowe, 1st Viscount Sherbrooke	University and Magdalen			
Richard Lyons, 1st Viscount Lyons	Christ Church			
George Goschen, 1st Viscount Goschen	Oriel			
Matthew White Ridley, 1st Viscount Ridley	Balliol			
Aretas Akers-Douglas, 1st Viscount Chilston	University			
George Cave, 1st Viscount Cave	St John's			
Frederic Thesiger, 1st Viscount Chelmsford	Magdalen			
Walter Hume Long, 1st Viscount Long	Christ Church			
George Younger, 4th Viscount Younger of Leckie	New College			
Robert Cecil, 1st Viscount Cecil of Chelwood	University			
Douglas Hogg, 3rd Viscount Hailsham	Christ Church			
Charles Bathurst, 1st Viscount Bledisloe	University			
Christopher Bathurst, 3rd Viscount Bledisloe	Trinity			
Herbert Samuel, 1st Viscount Samuel				
John Simon, 1st Viscount Simon	Wadham and All Souls			
George Lambert, 2nd Viscount Lambert	New College			
Charles Portal, 1st Viscount Portal of Hungerford	Christ Church			
Robert Hudson, 1st Viscount Hudson	Magdalen			
Duff Cooper, 1st Viscount Norwich	New College			
Osbert Peake, 1st Viscount Ingleby	Christ Church			
Walter Monckton, 1st Viscount Monckton of Brenchley	Balliol			
Derick Heathcoat Amory, 1st Viscount Amory	Christ Church			
Alan Lennox-Boyd, 1st Viscount Boyd of Merton	Christ Church			
Simon Lennox-Boyd, 2nd Viscount Boyd of Merton	Christ Church			
David Eccles, 1st Viscount Eccles	New College			
Charles Stourton, 26th Baron Mowbray	Christ Church			
Ralph Stonor, 7th Baron Camoys	Balliol			
Nathaniel Fiennes, 21st Baron Saye and Sele	New College			
John Bourchier, 2nd Baron Berners				
Richard Onslow, 1st Baron Onslow	St Edmund Hall			
Arthur Stanley, 5th Baron Sheffield and 5th Baron Stanley of Alderley	Balliol			
Charles Abbot, 1st Baron Colchester	Christ Church			
Nicholas Vansittart, 1st Baron Bexley	Christ Church			
Philip Sidney, 1st Baron De L'Isle and Dudley	Christ Church			
Hussey Vivian, 1st Baron Vivian	Exeter			
Francis Baring, 1st Baron Northbrook	Christ Church			
Eric Lubbock, 4th Baron Avebury	Balliol			
John Patrick Balfour, 3rd Baron Kinross				
George Kemp, 1st Baron Rochdale	Balliol			
Charles Cripps, 1st Baron Parmoor	New College and St John's			
Montague Woodhouse, 5th Baron Terrington	New College and Nuffield			
Colin Moynihan, 4th Baron Moynihan	University		Silver medal 1980 Olympics, MP 1983–1992, Minister for Sport 1987–1990, Chairman British Olympic Association 2005	
James Salter, 1st Baron Salter	Brasenose and All Souls			
Patrick Spens, 1st Baron Spens	New College			
Toby Low, 1st Baron Aldington	New College			
Niall Macpherson, 1st Baron Drumalbyn	Trinity			
Roger Makins, 1st Baron Sherfield	Christ Church			
Christopher Makins, 2nd Baron Sherfield	New College			
John Hope, 1st Baron Glendevon	Christ Church			
Julian Hope, 2nd Baron Glendevon	Christ Church			

MPs and life peers

Excluding any MP who subsequently was created a hereditary peer or succeeded to a hereditary peerage, and also excluding any life peer who was or is simultaneously a hereditary peer, but including MPs who disclaimed a hereditary peerage in order to sit in the House of Commons (between 1963 and 1999) as well as hereditary peers sitting as MPs under the terms of the House of Lords Act 1999.

Name	College	Years at Oxford	Party	Notes	Ref
Arthur Dyke Acland	Christ Church and Keble				
Richard Acland	Balliol				
Jonathan Aitken	Christ Church and Wycliffe Hall		Conservative		
Danny Alexander	St Anne's		Lib Dem		
Michael Alison	Wadham				
Julian Amery, Baron Amery of Lustleigh	Balliol		Conservative		
Leopold Stennett Amery	Balliol and All Souls				
Michael Ancram (Michael Kerr, 13th Marquess of Lothian)	Christ Church		Conservative		
William Anstruther-Gray, Baron Kilmany	Christ Church				
Jeffrey Archer, Baron Archer of Weston-super-Mare	Brasenose		Conservative		
Kenneth Baker, Baron Baker of Dorking	Magdalen		Conservative		
Nicholas Baker			Conservative		
Anthony Barber, Baron Barber	Oriel		Conservative		
Timothy Beaumont, Baron Beaumont of Whitley	Christ Church				
Alan Beith	Balliol and Nuffield		Lib Dem		
Ronald Bell	Magdalen				
Tony Benn (formerly 2nd Viscount Stansgate)	New College		Labour		
Reginald Bennett	New College				
Keith Best	Keble				
John Biggs-Davison	Magdalen				
Angela Billingham, Baroness Billingham					
Henry Bilson Legge	Christ Church				
Geoffrey Bing	Lincoln				
Mark Bonham Carter, Baron Bonham-Carter	Balliol				
Maurice Bonham Carter					
Robert Boothby, Baron Boothby	Magdalen		Conservative		
Tim Boswell	New College				
John Bowis	Brasenose				
John Boyd-Carpenter, Baron Boyd-Carpenter	Balliol				
Edward Boyle, Baron Boyle of Handsworth	Christ Church		Conservative		
Ashley Bramall	Magdalen				
Gyles Brandreth	New College		Conservative		
Julian Brazier	Brasenose		Conservative		
Henry Brooke, Baron Brooke of Cumnor	Balliol				
Peter Brooke, Baron Brooke of Sutton Mandeville	Balliol		Conservative		
Jock Bruce-Gardyne	Magdalen				
Chris Bryant	Mansfield		Labour		
Simon Burns	Oxford		Conservative		
Alistair Burt	St John's				
Kenneth Carlisle	Magdalen				
Bill Cash	Lincoln				
Barbara Castle, Baroness Castle of Blackburn	St Hugh's		Labour		
Paul Channon, Baron Kelvedon	Christ Church		Conservative		
Donald Chapman, Baron Northfield	Nuffield				
Christopher Chataway	Magdalen				
Hugh Childers					
Lord Randolph Churchill	Merton				
Randolph Churchill	Christ Church				
James Clappison	The Queen's				
Alan Clark	Christ Church		Conservative		
George Clarke	Brasenose and All Souls				
Robert Cooke	Christ Church				
Jim Cousins	New College				
Aidan Crawley	Trinity				
Mary Creagh	Pembroke				
Julian Critchley	Pembroke				
Anthony Crosland	Trinity		Labour		
Richard Crossman	New College		Labour		
Petre Crowder	Christ Church				
Edwina Currie	St Anne's		Conservative		
David Curry	Corpus Christi				
Horace Plunkett	University				
Henry d'Avigdor-Goldsmid	Balliol				
Edward Davey	Jesus		Lib Dem		
Denzil Davies	Pembroke				
Geraint Davies	Jesus		Labour		
Edmund Dell	The Queen's		Labour		
Douglas Dodds-Parker	Magdalen				
Stephen Dorrell	Brasenose		Conservative		
James Douglas-Hamilton, Baron Selkirk of Douglas	Balliol				
William Dowdeswell	Christ Church				
Tom Driberg, Baron Bradwell	Christ Church		Labour		
John Dugdale	Christ Church		Labour		
Edward du Cann	St John's		Conservative		
Philip Dunne	Keble				
John Eliot	Exeter				
Peter Emery	Oriel				
Evelyn Emmet, Baroness Emmet of Amberley	Lady Margaret Hall				
Derek Enright	Wadham				
Eric Errington	Trinity				
Gwynfor Evans	St John's				
David Faber	Balliol				
Michael Fabricant					
Paul Farrelly	St Edmund Hall				
Mark Field	St Edmund Hall				
Nathaniel Fiennes	New College				
Adrian John Flook					
Bernard Floud	Wadham				
Dingle Foot	Balliol		Liberal, Labour		
Michael Foot	Wadham		Labour		
Gerald Fowler	Lincoln				
Charles James Fox	Hertford				
Hugh Fraser	Balliol				
Peter Fry	Worcester				
Hugh Gaitskell	New College		Labour		
Tam Galbraith	Christ Church				
Roy Galley	Worcester				
Timothy Garden, Baron Garden	St Catherine's				
Edward Garnier	Jesus		Conservative		
David Gauke	St Edmund Hall				
Robert Gavron, Baron Gavron	St Peter's				
Andrew George	University		Lib Dem		
Neil Gerrard	Wadham				
John Gilbert, Baron Gilbert	St John's				
Ian Gilmour, Baron Gilmour of Craigmillar	Balliol		Conservative		
David Ginsburg	Balliol				
Richard Glyn	Worcester				
Patrick Gordon Walker, Baron Gordon-Walker	Christ Church		Labour		
Bryan Gould	Balliol		Labour		
James Gray	Christ Church				
Damian Green	Balliol		Conservative		
Nia Griffith	Somerville				
Joseph Grimond, Baron Grimond	Balliol		Liberal		
John Grogan	St John's				
Michael Hamilton	University				
Mark Harper	Brasenose				
Harwood Harrison	Trinity				
Alan Haselhurst	Oriel				
Denis Healey, Baron Healey	Balliol		Labour		
David Heath	St John's				
David Heathcoat-Amory	Christ Church				
John Hemming	Magdalen				
A. P. Herbert	New College				
Michael Heseltine, Baron Heseltine	Pembroke		Conservative		
Patricia Hewitt	Nuffield		Labour		
John Heydon Stokes	The Queen's				
John Hill	Merton				
Keith Hill	Corpus Christi				
Sarah Hogg, Viscountess Hailsham and Baroness Hogg	Lady Margaret Hall				
Philip Hollobone	Lady Margaret Hall				
Richard Holme, Baron Holme of Cheltenham	St John's				
Peter Hordern	Christ Church				
Martin Horwood	The Queen's				
Les Huckfield	Keble				
Ednyfed Hudson Davies	Balliol				
Chris Huhne	Magdalen		Lib Dem	First cabinet minister in British history to be forced to resign due to criminal proceedings.	
George Ward Hunt	Christ Church				
Nick Hurd					
Marmaduke Hussey, Baron Hussey of North Bradley	Trinity		Conservative		
Harry Hylton-Foster	Magdalen				
Thomas Iremonger	Oriel				
Henry Ireton	Trinity				
Arthur Irvine	Oriel				
Godman Irvine	Magdalen				
Robert Victor Jackson	St Edmund Hall and All Souls				
Douglas Jay, Baron Jay	New College and All Souls		Labour		
Margaret Jay, Baroness Jay of Paddington	Somerville		Labour		
Roy Jenkins, Baron Jenkins of Hillhead	Balliol		Labour, Lib Dem		
Toby Jessel	Balliol				
Keith Joseph, Baron Joseph	Magdalen and All Souls		Conservative		
Gerald Kaufman	The Queen's		Labour		
Elaine Kellett-Bowman	St Anne's				
Anthony Kershaw	Balliol				
Marcus Kimball, Baron Kimball	Trinity				
Peter Michael Kirk	Trinity				
Susan Kramer	St Hilda's		Lib Dem		
Ivan Lawrence	Christ Church		Conservative		
Nigel Lawson, Baron Lawson of Blaby	Christ Church		Conservative		
Hastings Lees-Smith	The Queen's				
George Cornewall Lewis	Christ Church				
Martin Linton	Pembroke		Labour		
Marcus Lipton	Merton				
Evan Luard	St Antony's				
Ian Lucas	New College				
Hugh Lucas-Tooth	Balliol				
Ian MacArthur	The Queen's				
Andrew McIntosh, Baron McIntosh of Haringey	Jesus				
John Mackintosh	Balliol				
Francis McLaren	Balliol				
Martin McLaren					
Robert Maclennan, Baron Maclennan of Rogart	Balliol				
Denis MacShane	Merton		Labour		
Bryan Magee	Keble				
Humfrey Malins	Brasenose				
Joseph Mallalieu	Trinity				
Peter Mandelson	St Catherine's		Labour		
David Marquand	Magdalen, St Antony's, and Mansfield		Labour		
Gordon Marsden	New College and St Antony's				
Edmund Marshall	Magdalen				
Angus Maude, Baron Maude of Stratford-upon-Avon	Oriel				
Reginald Maudling	Merton		Conservative		
Robin Maxwell-Hyslop	Christ Church				
Christopher Paget Mayhew, Baron Mayhew	Christ Church				
Michael Meacher	New College		Labour		
Patrick Mercer	Exeter				
Anthony Meyer	New College		Conservative		
Stephen Milligan	Magdalen				
Norman Miscampbell	Trinity				
Austin Mitchell	Nuffield		Labour		
Rhodri Morgan	St John's		Labour		
Alfred Morris, Baron Morris of Manchester	Ruskin and St Catherine's		Labour		
Frederick William Mulley, Baron Mulley	Christ Church				
Airey Neave	Merton		Conservative		
Tony Newton, Baron Newton of Braintree	Trinity		Conservative		
Godfrey Nicholson	Christ Church				
Nigel Nicolson	Balliol				
Michael Noble, Baron Glenkinglas	Magdalen				
Steven Norris	Worcester				
Edward O'Hara	Magdalen				
Matthew Oakeshott, Baron Oakeshott of Seagrove Bay	Nuffield				
Arthur Onslow	Wadham				
Cranley Onslow, Baron Onslow of Woking	Oriel				
Ian Orr-Ewing, Baron Orr-Ewing	Trinity				
Graham Page	Magdalen				
Peter Palumbo, Baron Palumbo	Worcester				
John Parker	St John's				
Ben Parkin	Lincoln				
Christopher Patten, Baron Patten of Barnes	Balliol		Conservative	Governor of Hong Kong 1992–1997	
Andrew Pelling	New College				
John Peyton, Baron Peyton of Yeovil	Trinity				
James Pitman	Christ Church				
Alexander Pollock	Brasenose				
Barry Porter					
Christopher Price	The Queen's				
John Profumo	Brasenose		Liberal		
John Pym	Broadgates Hall				
Giles Radice, Baron Radice			Labour		
Eleanor Rathbone	Somerville				
Hugh Reynolds Rathbone	Trinity				
Tim Rathbone	Christ Church				
John Redwood	Magdalen and All Souls		Conservative		
Laurance Reed	University				
Philip Hammond	University				
Peter Rees, Baron Rees	Christ Church				
David Rendel	Magdalen and St Cross				
Tim Renton, Baron Renton of Mount Harry	Magdalen				
Robert Rhodes James	Worcester				
Nicholas Ridley, Baron Ridley of Liddesdale	Balliol		Conservative		
Geoffrey Rippon, Baron Rippon of Hexham	Brasenose				
Andrew Robathan	Oriel				
Barbara Roche	Lady Margaret Hall				
John Rodgers					
John Roper, Baron Roper	Magdalen				
Christopher Rowland	Corpus Christi				
Norman St John-Stevas, Baron St John of Fawsley	Christ Church		Conservative		
Duncan Sandys, Baron Duncan-Sandys	Magdalen		Conservative		
James Scott-Hopkins					
Brian Sedgemore	Corpus Christi				
Gillian Shephard, Baroness Shephard of Northwold	St Hilda's		Conservative		
Siôn Simon	Magdalen		Labour		
George Evelyn Sinclair	Pembroke				
John Sinclair	Trinity				
John Smith	St John's				
John Lindsay Eric Smith	New College		Conservative		
Peter Smithers	Magdalen				
Harold Soref	The Queen's				
Frank Soskice, Baron Stow Hill	Balliol		Labour		
Alexander Spearman	Hertford				
Ivor Stanbrook	Pembroke				
John Stanley	Lincoln				
Phyllis Starkey	Lady Margaret Hall				
Arthur Steel-Maitland	Balliol				
Martin Stevens	Trinity				
Michael Stewart, Baron Stewart of Fulham	St John's		Labour		
John Strachey	Magdalen		Labour		
William Strode	Exeter				
Shirley Summerskill	Somerville				
John Sutcliffe	New College				
Peter Tapsell	Merton				
Matthew Taylor	Lady Margaret Hall		Lib Dem		
William Teeling	Magdalen				
Peter Thomas, Baron Thomas of Gwydir	Jesus				
Jeremy Thorpe	Trinity		Liberal		
John Tilney	Magdalen				
James Tinn	Jesus				
Gordon Touche	University				
Andrew Turner	Keble				
Stephen Twigg	Balliol		Labour		
Andrew Tyrie	Trinity				
Edward Vaizey	Merton		Conservative		
William Robert Seymour Vesey-FitzGerald	Christ Church and Oriel				
David Waddington, Baron Waddington	Hertford				
William Waldegrave, Baron Waldegrave of North Hill	Corpus Christi and All Souls		Conservative		
Brian Walden	The Queen's and Nuffield		Labour		
David Walder	Christ Church				
Derek Walker-Smith	Christ Church				
William Wallace, Baron Wallace of Saltaire	St Antony's				
William Waller	Magdalen Hall				
Steve Webb	Hertford				
John Wells	Corpus Christi				
William Thomas Wells	Balliol				
Eirene Lloyd White, Baroness White	Somerville				
Phillip Whitehead	Exeter				
Ann Widdecombe	Lady Margaret Hall		Conservative		
Shirley Williams, Baroness Williams of Crosby	Somerville		Labour, Lib Dem		
Thomas Williams	St Catherine's and Manchester				
W. Llewelyn Williams	Brasenose				
Charles Williams-Wynn	Christ Church				
Watkin Williams-Wynn	Jesus				
Francis Windebank	St John's				
Patrick Wolrige-Gordon	New College				
Richard Wood, Baron Holderness	New College				
Sir Marcus Worsley, 5th Baronet	New College				
Tony Wright	Balliol				
Derek Wyatt	St Catherine's				
Woodrow Wyatt, Baron Wyatt of Weeford	Worcester		Labour, Conservative		
William Wyndham	Christ Church				
John Wynn					
William Yates	Hertford				
Kenneth Younger	New College				

== British Members of the European Parliament ==
Members of the European Parliament who have also been members of the parliament at Westminster appear in the list of MPs and life peers.

Name	College	Years at Oxford	Party	Notes	Ref
Philip Bushill-Matthews	University		Conservative		
Richard Corbett	Trinity		Labour		
Daniel Hannan	Oriel		Conservative		
Caroline Jackson	St Hugh's and Nuffield		Conservative		
Christopher Jackson	Magdalen		Conservative		
Stanley Johnson	Exeter		Conservative		
Shaun Spiers	St John's		Labour		
Charles Tannock	Balliol		Conservative		
Arthur Wellesley, Marquess of Douro	Christ Church and Keble		Conservative		

== Sub-national politicians ==
Many MPs and MEPs have also been involved in local politics. They appear in their respective sections, above.

Name	College	Years at Oxford	Party	Notes	Ref
Nicholas Boles	Magdalen			member of Westminster City Council 1998–2002	
Ian Frank Bowater	Magdalen			Lord Mayor of London 1969–1970	
Nicholas Bye				Mayor of Torbay 2003–2004, directly elected mayor of Torbay 2005–;	
Alexander Curtis	St Catherine's	2015–2018	Conservative	Ware Town Councillor 2015–, Mayor of Ware 2017–	
Laurence Fouweather	Kellogg	2005-2006	Liberal Democrat	Oxford City Councillor 2021 -	
George Gordon, 2nd Marquess of Aberdeen and Temair	Balliol			London County Council 1910–1925 & 1931–1934	
Cyril Jackson	New College	1885 BA Literae Humaniores		Agent-General for Western Australia 1910–11, Leader of London County Council 1911–15	
Boris Johnson	Balliol		Conservative	Editor of The Spectator 1999–2005, MP for Henley 2001–2008, Mayor of London 2008–2016	
Christopher Newbury	Keble			member of Wiltshire County Council 1997–, of the Congress of the Council of Europe 1998–	
Kathleen Ollerenshaw	Somerville			Lord Mayor of Manchester 1975–1976	
Lena Townsend	Somerville			Leader of the Inner London Education Authority 1969–1970	
Mike Woodin	Wolfson and Balliol			Green Party member of Oxford City Council 1994–2004	

== Civil servants ==
Name	College	Years at Oxford	Notes	Ref
Robert Armstrong, Baron Armstrong of Ilminster	Christ Church		Cabinet Secretary 1979–87	
Edward Bridges, 1st Baron Bridges	Magdalen		Cabinet Secretary 1938–46, Permanent Secretary to the Treasury 1946–56	
Norman Brook, 1st Baron Normanbrook	Wadham		Secretary of the Cabinet 1947–62, Chairman of the BBC 1964–67	
Robin Butler, Baron Butler of Brockwell	University		Cabinet Secretary 1988–98, Master of University College, Oxford 1997–	
Suma Chakrabarti	New College		Permanent Secretary to the Department for International Development	
John Elvidge			Permanent Secretary to the Scottish Executive 2003–	
Thomas Farrer, 1st Baron Farrer	Balliol		permanent secretary to the Board of Trade 1867–86	
David Faulkner	St John's		Dep Secy, Home Office 1982–90; Chairman, Howard League for Penal Reform 1998–2002	
Warren Fisher	Hertford		Permanent Secretary of the Treasury and Head of the Civil Service 1919–39	
John Gieve	New College		permanent secretary, Home Office 2001–05; deputy governor, Bank of England 2006–	
Robin Harris			Director Conservative Research Department 1985–88, member Prime Minister's Policy Unit 1989–90	
David Kelly	Linacre		sometime UN weapons inspector and Head of Defence Microbiology Division Porton Down	
Tim Lankester	Corpus Christi		Permanent Secretary Overseas Development Administration 1989–94	
Robin Leigh-Pemberton, Baron Kingsdown	Trinity		Governor of the Bank of England 1983–93	
Ralph Lingen, 1st Baron Lingen	Trinity and Balliol		Sec to the Education Office 1849–69, Permanent Secy to the Treasury 1869–85	
Nicholas Macpherson	Balliol		Permanent Secretary to the Treasury 2005–	
Geoff Mulgan	Balliol		Dir Young Foundn 2005–, formerly Dir PM's Strategy Unit, Dir Demos 1993–98	
David Normington	Corpus Christi		Permanent Secretary to the Department for Education and Skills 2001–05, to the Home Office 2005–	
Ronald Oxburgh, Baron Oxburgh	University		President Qu Coll Cam 82–88, Chief Scientific Adv MoD 88–93, Rector Imp Coll Lon 93–00	
John Rickard	St John's		Chief Economic Adviser, UK Government; Fiscal Advisor, Ministry of Finance, Republic of Moldova	
Ivan Rogers			Principal Private Secretary to the Prime Minister 2003–	
Michael Scholar	St John's		Permanent Secy Welsh Office 1993–96, Department of Trade & Industry 1996–2001	
Martin Sixsmith			Director of Communications, Department for Transport, Local Government, and the Regions 2001–02	
Nicholas Stern			Prof of Economics LSE 1994–99; Chief Economist & Sen V-P World Bank 2000–03, Hd of Govt Economic Service 2003–	
Will Straw	New College			
Henry Summers	Trinity		Under-Secretary to Ministry of Housing and Local Government 1955–71	

== Diplomats ==
Name	College	Years at Oxford	Notes	Ref
Antony Acland	Christ Church		head of Diplomatic Service 1982–86, ambassador to Washington 1986–91, provost of Eton 1991–2000	
Hugh James Arbuthnott	New College		Ambassador to Romania 1986–89, Portugal 1989–93, Denmark 1993–96	
Julian Asquith, 2nd Earl of Oxford and Asquith	Balliol		Governor of the Seychelles 1962–67	
Malcolm Barclay-Harvey	Christ Church		MP 1923–29 & 1931–39, Governor South Australia 1939–44	
Lord William Bentinck	Christ Church		Governor General of India 1828–35	
James Bryce, 1st Viscount Bryce	Trinity and Oriel		MP 1880–1907, Ambassador to the United States 1907–13	
George Curzon, 1st Marquess Curzon of Kedleston	Balliol and All Souls		Viceroy of India 1899–1905, Foreign Secretary 1919–24	
John Hamilton-Gordon, 1st Marquess of Aberdeen and Temair			Governor General of Canada 1893–98	
Frederick Hamilton-Temple-Blackwood, 1st Marquess of Dufferin and Ava	Christ Church		Gov Gen Canada 1872–78, Viceroy India 1884-8	
David Hannay, Baron Hannay of Chiswick	New College		Ambassador to EEC 1985–90, to UN 1990–96, UN Special Rep Cyprus 1996–2003	
Sir James Harford	Balliol		Governor and Commander-in-Chief of Saint Helena 1954–58	
Nicholas Henderson	Hertford		Ambassador to France 1975–79, to the US 1979–82, Lord Warden of the Stannaries 1985–90	
Michael Jay, Baron Jay of Ewelme	Magdalen		Ambassador to France 1996–2001; Permanent Under-Secretary, FCO 2002–06	
Gladwyn Jebb, 1st Baron Gladwyn	Magdalen		Acting Sec-Gen UN 1945–46, Ambassador to UN 1950–54, to France 1954–60, MEP 1973–76	
John Kerr, Baron Kerr of Kinlochard	Pembroke		Permanent Under-Sec, FCO 1997–2002; Sec Gen, European Convention 2000–03	
Murray MacLehose, Baron MacLehose of Beoch	Balliol		Governor of Hong Kong 1971–82	
John Maffey, 1st Baron Rugby	Christ Church		Gov-Gen Sudan 1926–33, Perm Under-Sec for Colonies 33–37, Rep to Ireland 39–48	
Frederick Millar, 1st Baron Inchyra	New College		Ambassador, W. Germany 1955–56, Permanent Under-Secy for Foreign Affairs 1957–62	
Edward Mortimer	All Souls		Hd of Speechwriting Executive Office of the Sec Gen of the UN 1998–, Dir of Communications 2001–	
Arthur Nicolson, 1st Baron Carnock			Ambassador to Spain 1904–5, to Russia 1905–10, Under-Secretary for Foreign Affairs 1910–16	
David Ormsby-Gore, 5th Baron Harlech			Ambassador to the United States 1961–65	
Ivor Roberts	Keble, St Antony's and Trinity		Ambassador to Yugoslavia 1992–98, Ireland 1999–2003, Italy 2003–06	
Frederic Rogers, 1st Baron Blachford	Oriel		Permanent Under-Secretary of State for the Colonies 1860–71	
Frederic Rogers, 1st Baron Blachford	Balliol		Permanent Under-Secretary of State for the Colonies 1860–71	
Nigel Sheinwald	Balliol		British Ambassador to the United States 2007-2012	
John Weston	Worcester		Dep Cabinet Secretary 1988–92, Permanent Rep NATO 1992–95, Permanent Rep UN 1995–98	
David Williamson, Baron Williamson of Horton	Exeter		Head of Eur Secretariat Cabinet Office 1983–87, Sec-Gen Eur Commn 1987–97	

== Members of the Royal Household ==
Name	College	Years at Oxford	Notes	Ref
Henry Agar-Ellis, 3rd Viscount Clifden	Christ Church		Gentleman of the Bedchamber to the Prince Consort 1846–52	
Sedley Andrus	St Peter's Hall		Lancaster Herald 1972–82; Bluemantle Pursuivant 1970–72; Beaumont Herald Extraordinary 1982–2009	
John Anstis the elder	Exeter		Garter King of Arms 1718–44; M.P. 1702–05, 1711–13, 1713–22	
John Anstis the younger	Corpus Christi		Garter King of Arms 1727–54 (jointly with his father 1727–44)	
Sir George Bellew	Christ Church		Garter King of Arms 1950–61; Secretary of the Order of the Garter 1961–74; Somerset Herald 1926–50; Portcullis Pursuivant 1922–26	
Phillip Bone	Exeter		Rouge Dragon Pursuivant since 2023	
John Brooke-Little	New College		Clarenceux King of Arms 1995–97; Norroy and Ulster King of Arms 1980–95; Richmond Herald 1967–80; Bluemantle Pursuivant 1956–67	
Thomas Stonor, 7th Baron Camoys	Balliol		Lord Chamberlain 1998–2000	
Clive Cheesman	Oriel		Norroy and Ulster King of Arms since 2024; Richmond Herald 2010–24; Rouge Dragon Pursuivant 1998–2010,	
Hubert Chesshyre	Christ Church		Clarenceux King of Arms 1997–2010; Norroy and Ulster King of Arms 1995–97; Chester Herald 1978–95; Rouge Croix Pursuivant 1970–78	
G. E. Cokayne	Exeter		Clarenceux King of Arms 1894–1911; Norroy King of Arms 1882–94; Lancaster Herald 1870–82; Rouge Dragon Pursuivant 1859–70	
Sir Colin Cole	Brasenose		Garter King of Arms 1978–92; Windsor Herald 1966–78; Portcullis Pursuivant 1957–66	
Simon Ramsay, 16th Earl of Dalhousie	Christ Church		Lord Chamberlain to Queen Elizabeth the Queen Mother 1965–1992	
Oliver Dawnay	Balliol		Private Secretary to Queen Elizabeth the Queen Mother 1951 to 1956	
Robin de la Lanne-Mirrlees	Merton		Richmond Herald 1962–67; Rouge Dragon Pursuivant 1952–62	
Patric Dickinson	Exeter		Clarenceux King of Arms 2010–21; Secretary of the Order of the Garter 2004–24; Norroy and Ulster King of Arms 2010; Richmond Herald 1989–2010; Rouge Dragon Pursuivant 1978–89	
Sir John Dugdale	?		Norroy King of Arms 1686–1700; Windsor Herald 1675–86	
Montague Eliot, 8th Earl of St Germans	Exeter		Groom of the Robes to HM King George V 1920–36	
Sir Edward Ford	New College		Asst Private Secretary to HM King George VI 1946–52, to HM The Queen 1952–67, Extra Equerry 1955–2006	
John Guillim	?		Rouge Croix Pursuivant 1613–21	
Douglas Douglas-Hamilton, 14th Duke of Hamilton	Balliol		Lord Steward of the Household 1940–64	
Dominic Ingram	Magdalen		Chester Herald since 2024; Portcullis Pursuivant 2022–24	
Robin Janvrin, Baron Janvrin	Brasenose		Private Secretary to the Sovereign 1999–2007; Deputy Private Secretary to the Sovereign 1996–99; Assistant Private Secretary to the Sovereign 1990–96; Press Secretary to the Sovereign 1987–90	
Arthur Larken	St Alban Hall		Richmond Herald 1882–89; Portcullis Pursuivant 1878–82	
Sir Alan Lascelles	Trinity		Private Secretary to the Sovereign 1943–53; Assistant Private Secretary to the Sovereign 1935–43	
Roger Lumley, 11th Earl of Scarbrough	Magdalen		Lord Chamberlain 1952–63	
Michael Maclagan	Trinity		Richmond Herald 1980–89; Portcullis Pursuivant 1970–80	
George Manwaring	?		Richmond Herald from 1635; possibly deceased in 1646	
Henry Robert Charles Martin	Lincoln		Richmond Herald 1928–30; Rouge Croix Pursuivant 1922–28	
Theobald Mathew	Balliol		Windsor Herald 1978–97; Rouge Dragon Pursuivant 1970–78	
Philip Moore, Baron Moore of Wolvercote	Brasenose		Private Secretary to the Sovereign 1977–86; Deputy Private Secretary to the Sovereign 1972–77; Assistant Private Secretary to the Sovereign 1966–72	
Iain Moncreiffe of that Ilk	Christ Church		Falkland Pursuivant 1952–53, Kintyre Pursuivant 1953–61, Albany Herald 1961–85	
Robert Noel	Exeter		Clarenceux King of Arms since 2024; Norroy and Ulster King of Arms 2021–24; Lancaster Herald 1999–2021; Bluemantle Pursuivant 1992–99	
Hugh Percy, 10th Duke of Northumberland	Christ Church		Lord Steward of the Household 1973–88	
Sir Michael Peat	Trinity		Principal Private Secretary to the Prince of Wales and Duchess of Cornwall 2005–	
John Allen-Petrie	Oriel		Windsor Herald since 2019; Rouge Croix Pursuivant 2013–19	
Sir John Riddell, 13th Baronet	Christ Church		Private Secretary to the Prince of Wales 1985–1990	
Matthew White Ridley, 4th Viscount Ridley	Balliol		Lord Steward of the Household 1989–2001	
Archibald Russell	Christ Church		Clarenceux King of Arms 1954–55; Lancaster Herald 1922–54; Rouge Croix Pursuivant 1915–22	
Mark Scott	Mansfield		Somerset Herald since 2024; Bluemantle Pursuivant 2019–24	
Stuart Shilson	Balliol		Assistant Private Secretary to HM The Queen 2001–2004	
William Smith	Brasenose		Rouge Dragon Pursuivant 1597–1618	
Michael Trappes-Lomax	New College		Somerset Herald 1951–67; Rouge Dragon Pursuivant 1946–51	
Sir Anthony Wagner	Balliol		Garter King of Arms 1961–78; Clarenceux King of Arms 1978–95; Richmond Herald 1943–61; Portcullis Pursuivant 1931–43	
Knox Ward	New College		Clarenceux King of Arms 1726–41	
Alastair Watson	New College		Private Secretary to the Duke of York 2002–12	
William Wyrley	Balliol		Rouge Croix Pursuivant 1604 (probably until 1613)	

== Military, security, and police personnel ==
Victoria Cross or George Cross recipients listed first.

Name	College	Years at Oxford	Notes	Ref
Lieutenant General Sir Adrian Carton de Wiart, VC, KBE, CB, CMG, DSO	Balliol			
Captain Dr Noel Godfrey Chavasse VC, Medal bar, Military Cross	Trinity College, Oxford	1904–1907	The only person to be awarded the Victoria Cross twice in World War I; the only man to be awarded both the VC and a bar in WWI - one of three men to have ever achieved it; also an Olympian and Medical Doctor. Graduated with First-class honours. With 16 War memorials, he is believed to be the most commemorated in the United Kingdom. Died in battle.	
Group Captain Leonard Cheshire, Baron Cheshire, VC, OM, DSO and two bars, DFC, RAF	Merton			
Captain John Liddell, VC, MC, Argyll and Sutherland Highlanders, RFC	Balliol	1908–?		
Captain Robert Nairac, GC, Grenadier Guards	Lincoln			
Colonel Sir Geoffrey Vickers, VC	Merton			
Captain Garth Neville Walford, VC, Royal Regiment of Artillery	Balliol	1900–?		
Trevor Bigham	Magdalen		Deputy Commissioner of The Metropolitan Police 1931–1935	
Ian Blair	Christ Church		Commissioner of The Metropolitan Police 2005 onwards	
Paul Condon, Baron Condon	St Peter's		Commissioner of The Metropolitan Police 1993–2000	
David Craig, Baron Craig of Radley	Lincoln		Chief of the Defence Staff 1988–1991, Convenor of Crossbenchers 1999–2004	
Cressida Dick	Balliol		Deputy Assistant Commissioner, Metropolitan Police 2006 onwards	
Drury Curzon Drury-Lowe	Corpus Christi		Lt-Gen British Army 1890–1908, Colonel of the 17th Lancers 1892–1895	
Colin McColl	The Queen's		Director of the Secret Intelligence Service 1989–1994	
Eliza Manningham-Buller	Lady Margaret Hall		Director-General of the Security Service 2002–2007	
Brian Paddick	The Queen's		deputy assistant commissioner, Metropolitan Police 2003 onwards	
John Rennie	Balliol		Director of the Secret Intelligence Service 1968–1973	
John Scarlett	Magdalen		Director of the Secret Intelligence Service 2004 onwards	
David Spedding	Hertford		Director of the Secret Intelligence Service 1994–1999	
David Westwood	Lady Margaret Hall		Chief Constable of Humberside Police 1999–2005	

== Other notable British people ==
Name	College	Years at Oxford	Notes	Ref
Peter Benenson	Balliol	1939–1940	Left Oxford because of WWII. Founder, Amnesty International (1961); General Secretary (1961–64), President (1961–66)	
Siân Berry	Trinity	1997 (graduated)	Principal Speaker of the Green Party of England and Wales 2006–07, Mayor of London candidate 2008	
Nicky Blair	Lady Margaret Hall	2004–2007	Son of Tony Blair, Bachelor of Arts Modern History, Co-Chair Oxford University Labour Club Trinity Term 2006, schoolmaster	
Beau Brummell	Oriel	1794–?	Arbiter of fashion and friend of The Prince Regent	
Emily Davison	St Hugh's	1895	First-class honours in English in the Oxford University examination for women, but women were unable to graduate at that time. Suffragette.	
Vivien Duffield	Lady Margaret Hall	1963–?	Philanthropist	
Arnold Goodman, Baron Goodman	University	1976–1986 (Master of University College)	Chairman of the Arts Council of Great Britain 1965–72	
Aletha Hayter	Lady Margaret Hall	1930–1933	British Council Representative to Belgium	
Eglantyne Jebb	Lady Margaret Hall	1895–1898	founder of Save the Children Fund (1919)	
Sir Nicholas Kenyon	Balliol		Controller of BBC Radio 3 1992–1998 and Managing Director, Barbican Centre 2007–	
Alexandra Knatchbull	Regent's Park College	2002–2005	BA Philosophy and Theology. Great-great-great-great-granddaughter of Queen Victoria, third cousin twice removed of The Queen, and god-daughter of Diana, Princess of Wales	
Elizabeth Pakenham, Countess of Longford	Lady Margaret Hall			
Rachel McLean	St Hilda's	1989–1991	English student and murder victim	
Max Nicholson	Hertford	1926–1929	founder of British Trust for Ornithology (1932) and WWF (1961), president of RSPB 1980–85	
Beau Nash	Jesus		Master of Ceremonies, Bath, Somerset	
Tom Parker Bowles	Worcester		Son of The Duchess of Cornwall and stepson and godson of The Prince of Wales. Member of Piers Gaveston Society.	
Jonathon Porritt	Magdalen		co-founder Forum for the Future 1996; Chairman Sustainable Development Commission 2000–	
Ben Summerskill	Merton		Chief Executive of Stonewall 2003–	
Olive Willis	Somerville	1895–1898	founder of Downe House School	

== See also ==
- A select list of former Rhodes Scholars
- List of Vice-Chancellors of the University of Oxford
- List of Current Heads of Oxford University Colleges, Societies, and Halls
