= William Hunt (officer of arms) =

British officer of arms

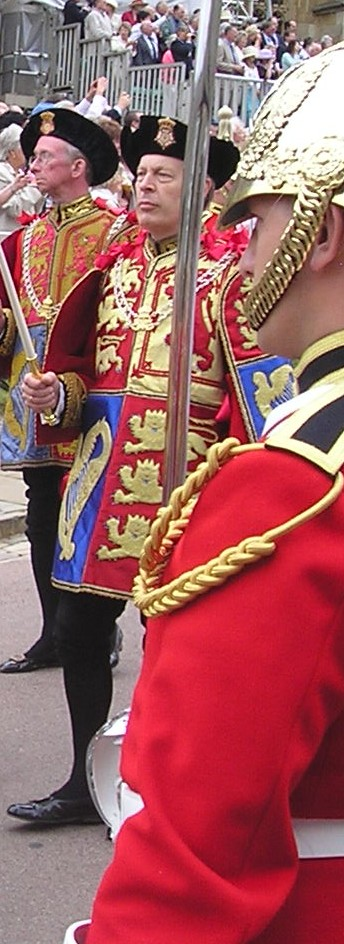
William Hunt, Windsor (centre), processing in the annual service of the Order of the Garter

William George Hunt TD FCA (born 8 December 1946) served as Windsor Herald of Arms in Ordinary at the College of Arms in London from 1999 to 2017.

== Life ==
Hunt worked for many years as a City chartered accountant before being appointed as Portcullis Pursuivant of Arms in Ordinary in 1992. He was promoted as Windsor Herald in 1999. In 2007 he succeeded Timothy Duke as Registrar of the College of Arms until 2014, and has been a Member of Council of The Heraldry Society since 1997. He retired as Windsor Herald on 31 May 2017.

Hunt was Clerk to HM Commission of Lieutenancy for the City of London (1990–2013) before being appointed to the Lieutenancy in 2012.

He was an elected Member of Common Council of the City of London Corporation (2004–2013) and is a liveryman and Past Master (2000–2001) of the Playing-Card Makers' Company.

He served in the Honourable Artillery Company retiring with the rank of Major in 2000. He was nominated as Genealogist of the Most Venerable Order of the Hospital of Saint John of Jerusalem in 2010, and appointed Commander of the Order of St John (CStJ) in 2011.

He married Michaela Wedel in 1998; the couple have two sons and live in London.

== An heraldic design by William Hunt ==
- South Wales Fire and Rescue Service

== Honours ==
- - Commander of the Order of St John
- - Territorial Decoration
- - Service Medal of the Order of St John

=== Arms ===
Coat of arms of William Hunt
Crest A Demi-Talbot Sable winding a Bugle Horn Gules garnished Or held in the dexter forepaw. Helm That of a Gentleman Escutcheon Azure a Stag's Head caboshed Argent on a Chief Or a Rose Gules seeded and barbed Proper between two Talbots passant Sable. Motto Pro Deo et Civitate ("For God and the City") Orders Order of St John circlet (watered black silk) Previous versions Hunt impaled his livery company's arms with those of his family during his year of office as Master Playing-Card Maker

== See also ==
- College of Arms
- Institute of Chartered Accountants in England and Wales
- Worshipful Company of Makers of Playing Cards
- David Hunt, Baron Hunt of Wirral

Heraldic offices
Preceded by Peter Spurrier	Portcullis Pursuivant; 1992 – 1999	Succeeded by Christopher Fletcher-Vane
Preceded by Theobald Mathew	Windsor Herald; 1999 – 2017	Succeeded by John Allen-Petrie
Preceded by Timothy Duke	Registrar of the College of Arms; 2007 – 2014	Succeeded by David White
Civic offices
Preceded by Gordon Robson	Master of the Worshipful Company of Makers of Playing Cards; 2000–2001	Succeeded by Yasha Beresiner
Preceded by Ian Luder	Court of Common Council (Commoncouncilman for Castle Baynard); 2004–2013	Succeeded by Raymond Catt
Honorary titles
Preceded by Sir Peter Gwynn-Jones	Honorary Genealogist of the Order of St John; 2010–2017	Succeeded by Sir Thomas Woodcock
