= Anthony Wagner =

20th-century English officer of arms at the College of Arms in London

Sir Anthony Wagner KCB KCVO FSA
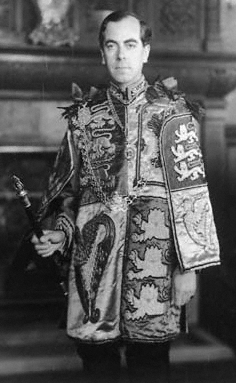
- Sir Anthony Richard Wagner, while serving as Richmond Herald of Arms in Ordinary in 1952.

Garter Principal King of Arms
- In office 1961–1978
- Monarch: Elizabeth II
- Preceded by: Sir George Bellew
- Succeeded by: Colin Cole

Personal details
- Born: 6 September 1908
- Died: 5 May 1995 (aged 86)

Sir Anthony Richard Wagner KCB KCVO FSA (6 September 1908 – 5 May 1995) was a long-serving officer of arms at the College of Arms in London. He served as Garter Principal King of Arms before retiring to the post of Clarenceux King of Arms. He was one of the most prolific authors on the subjects of heraldry and genealogy of the 20th century.

== Early life and education ==
Wagner's distant ancestor, Melchior Wagner, arrived in England from the Saxon city of Coburg in 1709 and became hatter to George I and George II.

Wagner's father, Orlando Wagner, ran a day-school in London. He attended Eton College and Balliol College, Oxford, on scholarships. He found the classics uninteresting and graduated with a third in Literae humaniores. From early age he had been interested in genealogy and his favourite book as a boy was Hereford Brooke George's Genealogical Tables Illustrative of Modern History.

== Professional career ==
Wagner joined the College of Arms as Portcullis Pursuivant of Arms in Ordinary in 1931. He was promoted to Richmond Herald of Arms in Ordinary in 1943 and Garter Principal King of Arms in 1961. In 1978 he retired to the subordinate position of Clarenceux King of Arms. Oxford University awarded him a DLitt and in 1979 he was appointed an honorary fellow of Balliol College.

He was a firm believer in the view that appointments to the college were for life. As a herald he enjoyed a very large practice and was able to train up a number of skilled and well-qualified assistants who later became officers of arms. His professional library was enormous, but he was also able to build up an important collection of early heraldic manuscripts from the Clumber and other sales.

During World War II he served in the War Office for four years, and then moved to the Ministry of Town and Country Planning, where he rose to be Principal Private Secretary to a series of ministers. Although he contemplated remaining in the Ministry, he returned to the College of Arms in 1946 and took over the extensive practice of Alfred Butler, Windsor Herald.

He took part in the Coronation of Queen Elizabeth ll in 1951 as Richmond Herald, and as Garter King of Arms took part in and was involved in the ceremonial aspects of the state funeral of Winston Churchill in 1965 and the Investiture of Charles, Prince of Wales at Caernarfon Castle in 1969.

One idea, which he pursued persistently, was the establishment of a museum in which to display the treasures of the College of Arms itself. Initially it was hoped to erect a building adjacent to the college, and a design was commissioned from Raymond Erith; this became impossible because of the increasing financial demands of repairs to the college itself. But in 1981 the Heralds' Museum opened in part of the Tower of London.

He was elected a Fellow of the American Society of Genealogists in 1944.

In 1981 he defended the ceremonial aspects of British political life in an interview with Philip Howard of The Times: "Ceremonial induces a more reflective mood. It is an art form that embodies the continuity of the nation and the deposit of history. We live in a time of great change. But every item in a ceremonial like the coronation links us directly to the roots of our nationality more than 10 centuries ago". Howard said Wagner "is one of our most distinguished historians, the man who made heraldry respectable and who holds the sceptre of continuity in our changing times".

=== Chronology ===
- Appointed Portcullis Pursuivant of Arms in Ordinary (1931)
- General Editor, Dictionary of British Arms (1940–1995)
- Appointed Richmond Herald of Arms in Ordinary (1943)
- Secretary of the Order of the Garter (1952–1961)
- Registrar of the College of Arms (1953–1960)
- Joint Register of the Court of Chivalry (1954–1995)
- Appointed Garter Principal King of Arms (1961–1978)
- Knight Principal, Imperial Society of Knights Bachelor (1962–1983)
- Appointed Clarenceux King of Arms (1978–1995)
- Director, Heralds' Museum, Tower of London (1978–1983)

== Other activities ==
Wagner had many interests outside the world and work of the College of Arms. He belonged to the Vintners' Company, serving as Master from 1973 to 1974; and was a member of a number of important dining clubs including the Society of Dilettanti, the antiquarian Cocked Hats, and the bibliophilic Roxburghe Club.

A number of large projects engaged his attention and enthusiasm. One, which arose from the Harleian Society, was an endeavour to list and describe the surviving English Rolls of Arms: to this series (CEMRA) Wagner contributed the first volume. Another project, connected with the Society of Antiquaries of London, was a revised edition of the ordinary of arms originally produced by J. W. Papworth. The first volume (of what was now entitled the Dictionary of British Arms) appeared in 1992.

== Publications ==
Genealogy occupied the foremost place in Wagner's affections, but his earliest publications made highly important contributions to the study of heraldry. Issues of State Ceremonial took third priority. His Historic Heraldry of England (1939) derived initially from an exhibition of panels in America, but drew a stern and scholarly line between those great men who were truly armigerous and those who were not. On the other hand, his Heralds and Heraldry in the Middle Ages (also 1939) shed new light on the development of the functions of the earliest officers of arms. Many years later he traced the whole story of the College of Arms in a massive volume entitled Heralds of England (1967). Roy Strong called the book "magisterial".

Wagner's English Genealogy (1960; revised editions 1972 and 1983) remains a standard work of reference. Many of his conclusions were rehearsed and reinforced in Pedigree and Progress (1975), where an important group of essays is annotated and brought up to date. Always he stressed the mobility of social life and class in the course of English history, and in maintaining this view ran contrary to the opinions of some professional English historians.

His Records and Collections of the College of Arms (1952) remains a useful finding aid to the college's archival holdings.

His office had been highly mechanised from an early stage, but all the more so once he became blind in 1984, whereupon, making every use of the aids of modern science, he bore his affliction with patience and dexterity. He dictated his autobiography, A Herald's World (1988).

He was also a staunch supporter of hereditary peers and defended their presence in the House of Lords in an article in the Times on 30 January 1969 which became the foreword to the 1970 edition of Burke's Peerage.

== Personal life ==
In 1953 (at the age of 44) Wagner married Gillian Graham, eldest daughter of Major H.A.R. Graham. In addition to taking over his father's house, 68 Chelsea Square, London, they acquired a country house in Aldeburgh, Suffolk. The couple had a daughter, Lucy McCahrrer and two sons, Roger Wagner and Mark Wagner.

Wagner's funeral service was held at the Church of St Benet Paul's Wharf, the religious home of the College of Arms since 1555. The Queen was represented by Sir Conrad Swan. He was buried at Aldeburgh.

== Honours ==
- Commander of the Royal Victorian Order (1953)
- Knight Commander of the Royal Victorian Order (1961)
- Knight Commander of the Order of the Bath (1978)
- Admiral, The Great Navy of the State of Nebraska, USA, (1987)

== Arms ==
Coat of arms of Anthony Wagner
Adopted 1950 Crest Out of a gold coronet a demi-lion or holding the dexter half of a wheel as in the arms. Escutcheon Sable, a lion rampant or holding between the paws the dexter half of a wheel argent.'' Motto Wachsam und glücklich ("Watchful and happy") Orders the circlet of the Royal Victorian Order and Order of the Bath. Badge Badge granted 1950: Within a collar of SS, the riband gules lettered argent, a wheel or. Previous versions Granted 1932: Sable, a lion rampant guardant double-queued or holding between the paws a demi-wheel argent. Crest: From a torse of the colours a demi-lion as in the arms. Motto: Wachsam und glücklich.

== See also ==
- College of Arms
- Heraldry

Heraldic offices
Preceded by Alfred Butler	Portcullis Pursuivant; 1931– 1943	Succeeded by The Lord Sinclair
Preceded by Henry Martin	Richmond Herald; 1943 – 1961	Succeeded by Robin de La Lanne-Mirrlees
Preceded by Sir George Bellew	Garter Principal King of Arms; 1961 – 1978	Succeeded by Sir Colin Cole
Preceded by John Walker	Clarenceux King of Arms; 1978 – 1995	Succeeded by John Brooke-Little
Court offices
Preceded by Sir George Bellew	Knight Principal of the Imperial Society of Knights Bachelor; 1962 – 1983	Succeeded by Sir Colin Cole
