= Heralds' Museum =

Coordinates: 51°30′29″N 0°4′34″W

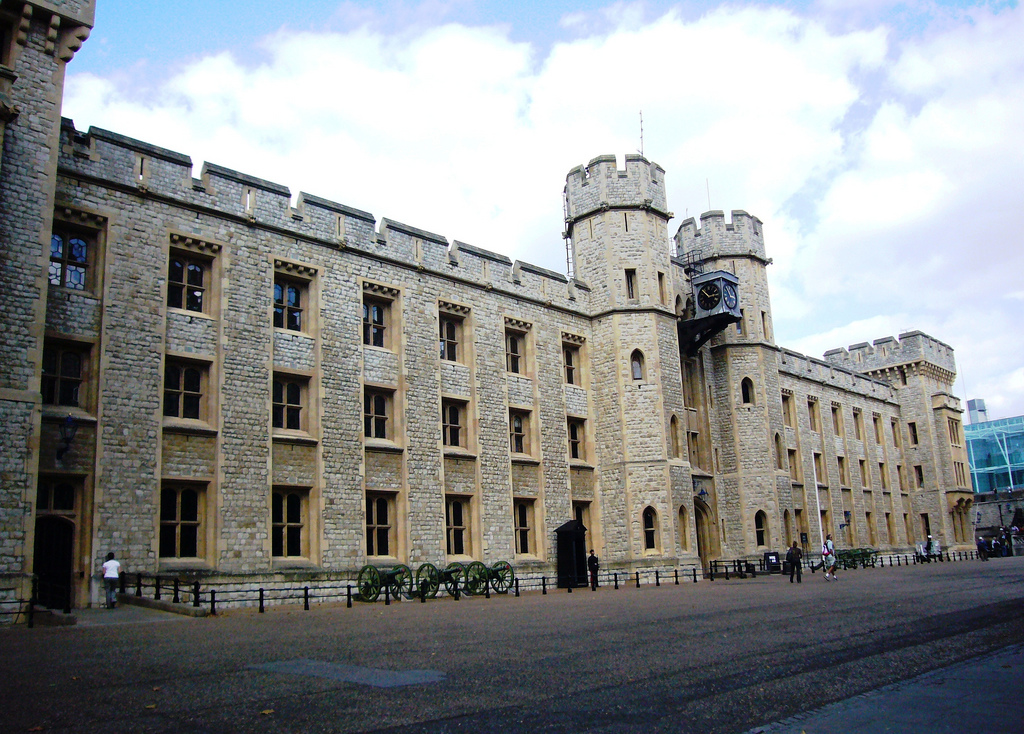
Waterloo Barracks, site of the museum

The Heralds' Museum was a museum of heraldry run by the College of Arms Trust at the Tower of London during the 1980s. It was situated in the old Waterloo Barracks within the Tower.

The original idea came from Sir Anthony Wagner, Garter Principal King of Arms. Wagner hoped to establish a museum in which to display the treasures of the College of Arms. A plan for a building adjacent to the college was commissioned from Raymond Erith, but not taken forward due to the increasing financial demands of repairs to the college building.

In 1980, the Heralds' Museum was opened by the Duke of Kent as part of the Tower of London. The museum was open during the summer season and admission was included in admission to the Tower. Exhibits included items from the collection of College of Arms and artifacts borrowed from other sources. Peter Spurrier served as its curator, and John Brooke-Little as its director. Sybil Burnaby was its press officer.

The museum closed later in the 1980s following the reorganization of the Royal Palaces.
