= Colin Berry (pathologist) =

British pathologist (born 1937)

Sir Colin Berry
- Born: Colin Leonard Berry; 28 September 1937 (age 88)
- Education: London University (MB BS; MD; PhD; DSc)
- Children: 2

Sir Colin Leonard Berry (born 28 September 1937) is a British academic, medical professor and pathologist.

== Career ==
Berry was educated as a physician at London University, obtaining an MBBS degree in 1961 and winning the Governor of Charing Cross Hospital's Clinical Gold Medal. In 1964, he joined the Institute of Child Health, Great Ormond Street becoming a British Heart Foundation Research Fellow and Senior Lecturer where he worked till 1970. He was awarded an MD degree in 1968 and a PhD degree in Pathology in 1970, both from the London University. Berry was subsequently appointed Reader in Pathology at Guy's Hospital in 1970 and Professor and Head of Department of Pathology at the Royal London Hospital in 1976.

In 1989, he was made Member (by Distinction) (MFPM) of the Faculty of Pharmaceutical Medicine of the Royal College of Physicians of London. Berry was a Member of the Medical Research Council of Great Britain between 1990 and 1994, and was President of the European Society of Pathology from 1989 till 1991 as well of the British Academy of Forensic Sciences from 2003 until 2005. He was awarded a DSc degree in 1992, again from London University.

In 1993, he was elected as Member of the Academy of Sciences Leopoldina, and of the North Rhine-Westphalian Academy of Sciences, Humanities and the Arts, as well knighted "for services to Medicine and Science".

He is an Honorary Fellow, since 1995 of the Faculty of Occupational Medicine (Hon.FFOM) of the Royal College of Physicians, since 1999 of the University of Central Lancashire, since 2005 of the German Pathological Society, and since 2006 of the British Toxicology Society.

Berry is a liveryman of the Worshipful Society of Apothecaries. He served as the Knight Principal of the Imperial Society of Knights Bachelor from 2012 to 2019, and is the Society's current Knight President (2026).

== See also ==
- Clinical pathology
- Imperial Society of Knights Bachelor

Preceded by The Lord Lingfield	Knight Principal of the Imperial Society of Knights Bachelor; 2012-present	Succeeded by Gary Hickinbottom
