= Portcullis Pursuivant =

Officer of the College of Arms

- The heraldic badge of Portcullis Pursuivant of Arms in Ordinary
- Heraldic tradition: Gallo-British
- Jurisdiction: England, Wales and Northern Ireland
- Governing body: College of Arms

Portcullis Pursuivant of Arms in Ordinary is a junior officer of arms at the College of Arms in London. The office is named after the Portcullis chained Or badge of the Beauforts, which was a favourite device of Henry VII. King Henry's mother was Lady Margaret Beaufort. The office was instituted around 1485, probably at the time of Henry's coronation. The badge of office is very similar to that of Somerset Herald of Arms in Ordinary, the latter being ensigned with the Royal Crown. The earliest recorded Portcullis Pursuivant was James or Jacques Videt, who was the plaintiff in a Common Pleas case in 1498 and again in 1500.

By Letters Patent under the Great Seal dated 24 August 2026, Caroline Mariah McWilliams was appointed to the office of Portcullis Pursuivant of Arms.

== Holders of the office ==
| Arms | Name | Date of appointment | Ref |
|---|---|---|---|
| | James Videt | (Henry VII) | |
| | Ralph Lagysse | (Henry VII) | |
| | Robert Fayery or Fairy | 1516–1549 | |
| | Richard Withers | 1550–1553 | |
| | John Cocke | 1553–1559 | |
| | Edward Merlin | 1559–1559 | |
| | Ralph Langman | 1559–1567 | |
| | Robert Glover | 1567–1571 | |
| | Richard Lee | 1571–1585 | |
| | William Segar | 1585–1588 | |
| | Thomas Lant | 1588–1597 | |
| | Samuel Thompson | 1597–1619 | |
| | Philip Holland | 1619–1625 | |
| | Thomas Preston | 1625–1633 | |
| | John Beauchamp | 1633–1660 | |
| | John Wingfield | 1660–1663 | |
| | Thomas Holford | From 1663 | |
| | Thomas Holford, junior | (James II) | |
| | Laurence Cromp | From 1689 | |
| | John Hesketh | (William III) | |
| | Thomas Wightwick | 1713–1718 | |
| | Richard Mawson | 1718–1745 | |
| | Thomas Thornberry | 1745 | |
| | Peter Toms | 1746–1780 | |
| | John-Doddington Forth | 1780–1817 | |
| | George Frederick Beltz | 1817–1822 | |
| | James Pulman | 1822–1838 | |
| | Sir Albert Woods | 1838–1841 | |
| | George Collen | 1841–1878 | |
| | Arthur Larken | 1878–1882 | |
| | William Lindsay | 1883–1894 | |
| | Thomas Joseph-Watkin | 7 April 1894 – 1913 | |
| | Keith Murray | 1913–1922 | |
| | George Bellew | 1922–1926 | |
| | Alfred Butler | 1926–1931 | |
| | Sir Anthony Wagner | 1931–1943 | |
| | Charles Murray Kennedy St Clair, 17th Lord Sinclair | 1949–1957 | |
| | Sir Alexander Colin Cole | 1957–1966 | |
| | Michael Maclagan | 1970–1980 | |
| | Peter Spurrier | 1981–1992 | |
| | William Hunt | 1992–1999 | |
| | Christopher Fletcher-Vane | 2012–2017 | |
| | Dominic Ingram | 2022–2024 | |
| | Caroline McWilliams | 2026—present | |

== See also ==
- Pursuivant
- Officer of Arms
- College of Arms
