= Gillian Wagner =

British writer and philanthropist (1927–2025)

Dame Gillian Wagner DBE
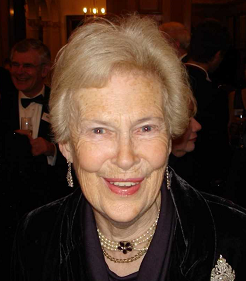
- Born: Gillian Mary Millicent Graham; 25 October 1927; London, England
- Died: 31 December 2025 (aged 98)
- Occupations: Writer and philanthropist
- Spouse: Sir Anthony Wagner (m. 1953)

Dame Gillian Mary Millicent Wagner DBE (née Graham; 25 October 1927 – 31 December 2025) was a British writer, philanthropist and social administrator, who was the first woman chair of the children’s charity Barnardo's, the Thomas Coram Foundation and the Carnegie Trust. She published biographical and historical works, as well as reports on social care.

== Early life and education ==
Gillian Mary Millicent Graham was born in London on 25 October 1927, the daughter of Major Henry Archibald Roger Graham and Hon. Margaret Beatrice Lopes. She was educated at Cheltenham Ladies' College and the University of Geneva, and later did a diploma in social administration at the London School of Economics, and subsequently a Ph.D. Her doctoral thesis was titled Dr Barnardo and the Charity Organisation Society: A reassessment of the Arbitration Case of 1877 (OCLC 500584755).

== Works and themes ==
Her 1979 biography of Thomas Barnardo was described in a Medical History review as the "first frank account of [his] character and career"; while a reviewer in Seventeenth-Century News called her book Thomas Coram, Gent. "a much-needed biography of this early pioneer of children’s charity". Her book, Miss Palmer's Diary (LCCN 2018-411229) was a biography of her ancestor, Ellen Palmer.

== Death ==
Wagner died on 31 December 2025, at the age of 98.

== Publications ==
- The Camera and Dr Barnardo (with Valerie Lloyd), 1974, National Portrait Gallery Publications, ISBN 0904017125
- Barnardo, 1979, Littlehampton Book Services, ISBN 0297775618
- Children of the Empire, 1982, Littlehampton Book Services, ISBN 0297780476
- The Chocolate Conscience, 1987, Chatto & Windus, ISBN 070112475X
- Thomas Coram, Gent.: 1668–1751, 2015, Boydell Press, ISBN 9781783270606
- Miss Palmer's Diary, 2017, I.B. Tauris, ISBN 1788310063

=== Reports ===
- A Positive Choice (Independent Review of Residential Care): A Guide to the Wagner Report 1988, National Institute for Social Work, ASIN B001NTUWO6
- Residential Care, Vol. 2: The Research Reviewed (with the National Institute for Social Care) 1988, Stationery Office Books, ISBN 0117010634
- Training for Social Care: Achieving Standards for the Undervalued Service, 1998, Policy Studies Institute, ISBN 1900909022
