= William Lindsay (officer of arms) =

William Lindsay CVO FSA Clarenceux King of Arms from 1922 until 1926.

William Alexander Lindsay CVO FSA (8 June 1846 – 13 September 1926) was a long-serving officer of arms at the College of Arms in London. Lindsay was the son of Hon. Colin Lindsay son of James 7th Earl of Balcarres, 24th Earl of Crawford and Lady Frances Howard, daughter of the Earl of Wicklow. He was educated at Eton and Trinity College, Cambridge, and was President of the Cambridge Union. On 7 May 1870, he married Lady Harriet Hamilton-Gordon, a daughter of the 5th Earl of Aberdeen and Mary Baillie. His heraldic career began in 1882 when he was appointed Portcullis Pursuivant in Ordinary at the College of Arms. He was promoted to the office of Windsor Herald of Arms in Ordinary in 1894. In 1919, he was promoted Norroy King of Arms after Charles Athill was promoted to Clarenceux King of Arms. Three years later, Lindsay followed Athill to the role of Clarenceux on Athill's death. Lindsay held the office from 1922 until his own death in 1926.

== Arms ==
Coat of arms of William Lindsay
Adopted Matriculated Lyon Register 1871, and with the College of Arms in 1897. Crest From an antique ducal coronet a swan's head neck & wings proper. Escutcheon Quarterly, (1 & 4) gules, a fess checquy argent & azure (Lindsay); (2) or, a lion rampant gules armed and langued azure debruised of a ribbon sable (Abernethy); (3) quarterly, (i & iv) gules, a bend between six cross crosslets fitchy argent (Howard); (ii & iii) argent, a lion rampant gules armed and langued azure (Forward). Motto Endure Fort

== See also ==
- King of Arms
- Herald
- Pursuivant

Heraldic offices
Preceded by James Pulman	Portcullis Pursuivant; 1882–1894	Succeeded by George William Collen
Preceded by Sir William Henry Weldon	Windsor Herald; 1894–1919	Succeeded by Sir Algar Howard
Preceded by Charles Athill	Norroy King of Arms; 1919–1922	Succeeded by Gordon Lee
Preceded by Charles Athill	Clarenceux King of Arms; 1922–1926	Succeeded by Gordon Lee
