= Robert Balchin, Baron Lingfield =

British educationalist (born 1942)

The Right Honorable The Lord Lingfield DL KStJ

Member of the House of Lords
- Lord Temporal
- Life peerage 17 December 2010

Personal details
- Born: Robert George Alexander Balchin; 31 July 1942 (age 84)
- Party: Conservative
- Spouse(s): The Lady Lingfield, Lady Balchin

Robert George Alexander Balchin, Baron Lingfield, DL KStJ (born 31 July 1942) is a British educationalist, noted as an advocate and pioneer for school autonomy. He also served as Director-General of St. John Ambulance from 1984 to 1990.

== Career ==
Lord Lingfield was chairman of the Grant-Maintained Schools Centre (formerly Foundation) from 1989 until 1999. He has been Chairman of the Centre for Education Management (now CEFM) since 1995.

He has written numerous articles on education and politics. His schools initiative was proclaimed by The Daily Telegraph's deputy editor, Benedict Brogan, as: "[being the] first and, as time passes, perhaps the most important legislative milestone achieved by the Coalition".

=== House of Lords ===
Knighted in 1993, becoming styled as Sir Robert Balchin, he was raised to the peerage as a Life Peer on 17 December 2010 as Baron Lingfield, of Lingfield in the County of Surrey. He sits on the Conservative benches in the House of Lords, and he speaks in parliament mainly on education matters.

=== Further functions ===
- Deputy Lieutenant of Greater London (16 May 2001).
- Chairman of the League of Mercy Foundation
- Chairman of the Trustees of ARNI
- Patron of the charity MaleVoicED, a charity supporting all males with Eating Disorders and other co-morbid conditions. He is also Chairman of The Cadet Vocational Qualifications Organisation (CVQO), a national charity that supports members of uniformed youth organisations to gain vocational qualifications for the activities they undertake within their youth organisation.

He was Knight Principal of the Imperial Society of Knights Bachelor from 2006 to 2012. He has served as Honorary Colonel of Humberside and South Yorkshire ACF since 1 May 2004, and as Honorary Colonel Leeds University Officers' Training Corps until June 2025.

== Awards and honours ==
=== British national honours ===
- – Life Peer as Baron Lingfield, of Lingfield, in the County of Surrey (created 17 December 2010)
- – Knight Bachelor (1993)
- – Knight of Justice, Order of St John (1985)
- – Officer (Brother), Order of St John (1983)

=== Other British honours ===
- Freeman of the City of London
- Liveryman of the Worshipful Company of Goldsmiths
- Liveryman of the Worshipful Company of Broderers
- Liveryman of the Worshipful Society of Apothecaries

=== Foreign honours ===
- – Commander, pro Merito Melitensi (1987)

=== Dynastic honours ===
- – Knight Grand Cross, Royal Order of Francis I (2014)
- – Knight Grand Cross, Order of the Eagle (2014)

=== Arms ===
Coat of arms of Robert Balchin, Baron Lingfield

Adopted
The armorial bearings of The Lord Lingfield were confirmed by the College of Arms in 1975, with the additional grant of supporters after being elevated to the peerage.
Coronet
Coronet of a Baron
Crest
A Demi-Bagwyn Argent, armed and unguled Or, gorged with a Collar compony Or and Vert, charged with Anchors counter-changed, and supporting a Wooden Beam Proper, attached to the Collar by a Chain Or.
Escutcheon
Quarterly: 1st & 4th, Vert, a Crescent between eight Mullets in lozenge Or (Balchin); 2nd & 3rd, Azure, a Chain fesswise each link per pale Or and Argent, between three Fleurs-de-Lis per pale Or and Argent (Skelton); en surtout, an Inescutcheon barry of six Ermine and Vert, charged with a Label of three Points in bend Or, each Point charged with an Annulet Gules (Kinlay-Balchin).
Supporters
Dexter: A Lion guardant Or, the body legs and tail semée of Spur Rowels spur upwards Gules, crowned with a Baron’s Coronet with Cap Proper;
Sinister: A Bagwyn Argent, armed, unguled and tail tufted Or, gorged with a Baron’s Coronet sans Cap Proper, attached thereto a Chain reflexed over the back and terminating in an Annulet Or.
Motto
De Bonne Esperance
(Of Good Hope)
Badge
Pendent from a tassled Cord Or and Vert, an Escallop Or.

== See also ==
- Lingfield, Surrey

Preceded by Sir Richard Gaskell	Knight Principal of the Imperial Society of Knights Bachelor; 2006 – 2012	Succeeded by Sir Colin Berry
Orders of precedence in the United Kingdom
Preceded by The Lord Green of Hurstpierpoint	Gentlemen; Baron Lingfield	Followed by The Lord Feldman of Elstree
