= Samuel Thompson (herald) =

English herald

Samuel Thompson (d. 1624) was employed by the herald William Segar, before being recommended by William Dethick to be granted a place as a pursuivant, as he was competent in Latin. He was appointed Portcullis pursuivant in 1597. He was promoted to be Windsor herald in 1617. In 1623, he conducted the visitation of Surrey as deputy for William Camden. He had a house in Streatham, where his will was written in May 1624, but asked to be buried in St John Zachary.
