= Alfred Butler =

Alfred Trego Butler MVO, MC, FSA, FASG (8 October 1880 – 22 December 1946) was a genealogist and officer of arms at the College of Arms in London.

== Early and personal life ==
Alfred Butler was born in 1880 as the second son of Robert Frederick Butler of Lynford Gardens, Hampstead. In 1905, he married Grace Blunt, daughter of Mr. J. Hughes Blunt of Huntingdon, and had two daughters. Butler died on 22 December 1946 at St John's Wood in London, and was survived by his wife and daughters.

== Military career ==
In the First World War, Butler served with the 8th Battalion, The Worcestershire Regiment, eventually rising to the rank of Captain. While a temporary Second Lieutenant, he was awarded the Military Cross. The citation reads:

For conspicuous gallantry and devotion to duty when in charge of a raid. He took up his duties at short notice, and was responsible for the training, of the party. He repelled an attempted counter-attack, and after inflicting considerable casualties successfully withdrew his party some 450 yards to our line, in spite of an enemy barrage across "No Man's Land."

== Heraldic and genealogical career ==
At the age of 17, Butler became a clerk to Henry Burke, then Somerset Herald. In 1919, on Burke's promotion to Garter Principal King of Arms, Butler became his secretary, and continued in this post until Burke's death in 1930. Burke specialised in genealogy, and Butler learned a lot from him, eventually being regarded as the foremost genealogist of his generation. During this time Butler also edited Burke's Peerage, from 1922 – 1926.

Butler became an officer of arms in his own right, being appointed Portcullis Pursuivant of Arms in Ordinary in 1926, and promoted to Windsor Herald of Arms in Ordinary in 1931. He was also made the Genealogist of the Order of the Bath in 1930, and Honorary Genealogist of the Royal Victorian Order in 1938. He resigned from both of these offices shortly before his death.

He was elected a Fellow of the American Society of Genealogists in 1944.

== Other honours and appointments ==
Alfred Butler was also a member of the council of the Harleian and British Record Societies, and of the Croft Lyons committee of the Society of Antiquaries, of which he became a fellow in 1927.

In 1930, Butler was made an Officer of the Order of St. John in 1930 and promoted to Commander in 1934.

== Coat of arms ==
As might be expected of an officer of arms, Butler bore a coat of arms. This was blazoned

- (Arms) Argent on a chief indented sable 3 covered cups or
- (Crest) On a torse argent and sable a vine fructed proper supported by two eagles argent
- (Motto) Je sers

== Notes ==
Heraldic offices
Preceded by Sir George Bellew	Portcullis Pursuivant; 1926 – 1931	Succeeded by Sir Anthony Wagner
Preceded by Sir Algar Howard	Windsor Herald; 1931 – 1946	Succeeded by Richard Graham-Vivian
