= Imperial Society of Knights Bachelor =

United Kingdom registered charity

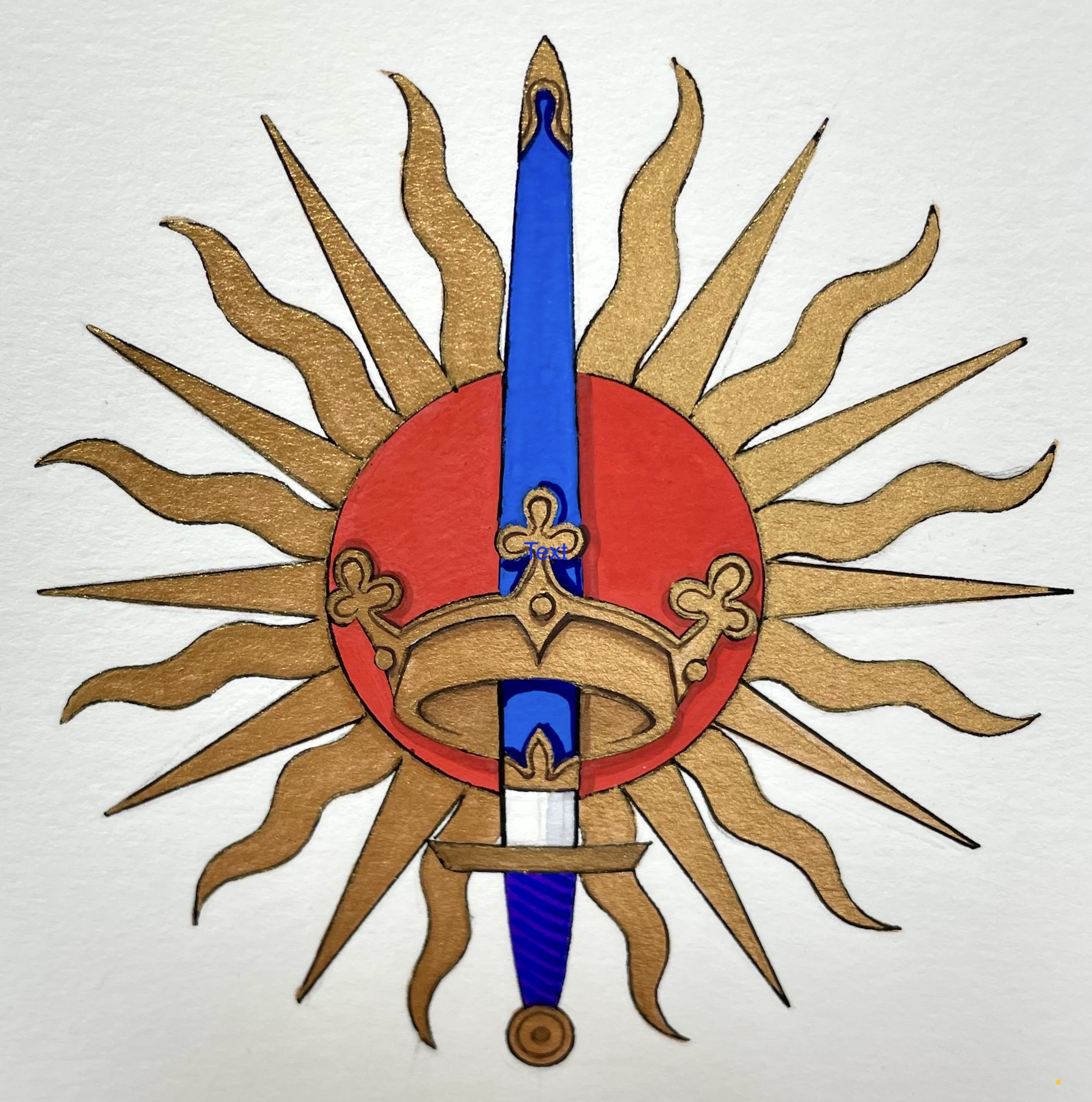
- Abbreviation: ISKB
- Established: 21st June 1908
- Founded at: 31 Essex Street, Strand, London
- Patron: HM the King
- Knight Principal: Sir Christopher Greenwood, GBE CMG KC
- Knight President: The Rt Hon Sir Gary Hickinbottom
- Provost: The Revd Canon Professor Peter Galloway, LVO OBE KStJ
- Website: https://www.iskb.co.uk/

The Imperial Society of Knights Bachelor (ISKB) was formed in 1908 in the United Kingdom and in 1912 received royal recognition, with Royal assent given by King George V for the Society to be called The Imperial Society of Knights Bachelor. It is a registered charity and seeks to uphold and advise on the dignity and rights of Knights Bachelor and knighthood. The Society was granted its first Royal Warrant by King George V, dated at Windsor on 21 April 1926. An additional Royal Warrant updating the first was granted by Queen Elizabeth II, dated at St James's Palace on 19 July 1973. A further Royal Warrant followed, which updated elements of the previous ones, and this was dated 4 December 1998. The Society maintains a Register of all Knights Bachelor, continuing the lapsed Roll instituted by King Charles I, which was continued by the College of Arms up to the year 1902. The first new Volume was signed by Queen Elizabeth II and Prince Philip, Duke of Edinburgh, on 10 July 1968, at the dedication service of the Chapel of the Knights Bachelor.

From 1977 until her death in 2022, the society's Patron was Her Majesty Queen Elizabeth II. In May 2024, His Majesty King Charles III became the new patron.

The society's charitable objectives include the relief of poverty, the advancement of education, support for hospitals, those afflicted by illness or disease and the maintenance of their chapel.

In 1962, the society established its own chapel in the Priory Church of St Bartholomew-the-Great in Smithfield, London. In 2005, the chapel was moved to St Martin's Chapel in the crypt of St Paul's Cathedral in London. The wives and daughters of the society's members are allowed to wear a special Lady's Brooch that displays the heraldic badge of the society.

== Publications ==
Periodically, the society published lists of living recipients of awards, with the subtitle A list of the existing recipients of the honour of Knighthood together with a short account of the origin, objects and work of ... the society.

The editions published by the society included the Order of General Precedence extant in England at the time, so that the 1939–1946 edition (20th edition), and the subsequent 1949–1950 edition (21st edition), indicated pre-war and post-war precedence.

== List of Knights Principal ==
1. The Rt Hon Sir Bargrave Deane (1908–1911)
2. Major-General Sir Henry Pellatt, CVO (1911–1923)
3. The Rt Hon Sir William Bull, 1st Baronet, MP (1923–1931)
4. Commander Sir Trevor Dawson, 1st Baronet (1931)
5. Sir Gerald Wollaston, KCB, KCVO (1931–1957)
6. The Hon. Sir George Bellew, KCB, KCVO, KStJ (1957–1962)
7. Sir Anthony Wagner, KCB, KCVO (1962–1983)
8. Sir Colin Cole, KCB, KCVO, TD (1983–1995)
9. Sir Conrad Swan, KCVO (1995–2000)
10. Sir Richard Gaskell (2000–2006)
11. The Rt Hon the Lord Lingfield, DL, KStJ (2006–2012)
12. Professor Sir Colin Berry (2012–2019)
13. The Rt Hon Sir Gary Hickinbottom (2019–2026)
14. Sir Christopher Greenwood, GBE CMG KC (2026–present)

== List of Registrars ==
1. The Rt Hon Sir William Bull, 1st Baronet, MP (1907-1920)
2. Sir Harry North (1920–1921)
3. Sir Park Goff, 1st Baronet, KC (1921–1939)
4. Sir Malcolm Fraser, 1st Baronet, GBE, KStJ, DL (1939–1941)
5. Sir Edwin Lutyens, OM, KCIE (1941–1944)
6. Sir Thomas Lumley-Smith, DSO (1944–1960)
7. Sir John Weir Russell (1960–1978)
8. Sir Arthur Driver (1978–1986)
9. Sir Roger Falk, OBE (1986–1991)
10. Sir Kenneth Newman, GBE, KStJ, QPM (1991–1998)
11. Sir Robert Balchin, DL (1998–2006)
12. Alderman Sir Paul Judge (2006–2012)
13. His Honour Sir Gavyn Arthur KStJ (2012–2016)
14. Sir Jeremy Elwes, CBE OStJ FRSA (2016–2017)
15. Sir Michael Hirst (2017–2023)
16. The Rt Hon Sir Tony Baldry, DL (2023–present)

== Arms ==
Coat of arms of Imperial Society of Knights Bachelor

Notes
Granted 8 March 1971.
Crest
On a chapeau Gules turned up Or in front of a sun in splendour Gules the rays Or a sword erect Proper quillons and pomel Or grip Purpure scabbard Azure garnished Or the blade part drawn the scabbard enfiled through a Saxon crown Or mantled gules doubled Or.
Escutcheon
Gules a sword erect Proper quillons and pomel Or grip Purpure scabbard Azure garnished Or the blade part drawn the scabbard enfiled through a Saxon crown between in chief two spurs Or.
Supporters
Dexter a female figure proper robed Argent purfled Azure holding in the exterior hand a palm branch Vert, sinister the figure of a knight armed in mail Proper the long surcoat Argent doubled Azure drawing his sword Proper quillons and pomel Or grip Purpure scabbard Azure garnished Or pendent by a guige Vert on the exterior arm a shield Gules charged with a sword erect Proper quillons and pomel Or grip Purpure scabbard Azure garnished Or the blade part drawn the scabbard enfiled through a Saxon crown between in chief two spurs Or.
Motto
Trouthe and Honour.

== See also ==
- Lists of knights bachelor
- Orders, decorations, and medals of the United Kingdom
