= Richard Gaskell (solicitor) =

English lawyer

Sir Richard Kennedy Harvey Gaskell (17 September 1936 – 17 July 2015) was an English lawyer. As president of the Law Society of England and Wales from 1988 to 1989, he was heavily involved in and a strong advocate for the reforms which ultimately allowed solicitors to have equal rights of audience in English courts (enacted in the Courts and Legal Services Act 1990).

== Early life and family ==
Born on 17 September 1926 at Woodchurch, Kent, the son of the medical doctor Kenneth Harvey Gaskell, and his wife Jean Winsome, née Beaven. His paternal grandmother was a descendant of William Harvey. Kenneth Gaskell, known as Mac, was in general practice at Woodchurch between 1933 and 1938, before he briefly studied at Addenbrooke's Hospital in Cambridge, then moved the family to Devon in 1939; after wartime service, Mac Gaskell took up a succession of posts in hospitals in Bristol from 1946. Richard Gaskell attended the independent school Marlborough College from 1950 to 1954.

== Legal career ==
Gaskell became an articled clerk at the Bristol-based firm of solicitors Burges Salmon in 1955; he was admitted a solicitor in 1960 and entered the law firm Lawrence Tucketts (also based in Bristol) that year as an assistant solicitor; he was made a partner in 1963, remaining as such through to 1997 (and as the firm's Senior Partner from 1989 to 1997). Afterwards, until 2009 Gaskell remained at Lawrence Tucketts (which became TLT LLP in 2000) as a consultant.

Gaskell served as president of the Bristol Law Society from 1978 to 1979, president of the Association of South Western Law Societies from 1980 to 1981, and finally as vice-president from 1987 to 1988 and then president from 1988 to 1989 of the Law Society of England and Wales; he was on the latter's council from 1969 and 1992. He was knighted in the 1989 Birthday Honours. Through his work in the Law Society, Gaskell was heavily involved in advocating for solicitors to be given equal rights of audience in the higher courts, which at that time barristers had a monopoly over; the Thatcher government was convinced of the merits of these arguments and enacted the reforms in the Courts and Legal Services Act 1990. At the same time, he sought to protect the solicitors' profession's monopoly over conveyancing, which the government wanted to remove; while the government had wanted to allow banks to do their own conveyancing work, advocacy from the Law Society under Gaskell resulted in these changes being watered down in the 1990 Act, so that banks could not carry out this work for people they were lending to and strict requirements were placed on the new non-solicitor conveyancers the Act allowed for. As The Times put it, Gaskell was therefore "at the heart of the biggest shake-up of the legal profession in the 20th century".

== Non-legal work and later life ==
Outside of the law, Gaskell was chairman of the SS Great Britain Project, and he "turned around" the project's stagnating progress.

He served as the Knight Principal of the Imperial Society of Knights Bachelor from 2000 to 2006.

Gaskell died on 17 July 2015. In his obituary, The Times described him as "one of Britain's most respected solicitors".

Legal offices
Preceded by Robert Birkitt	President of the Bristol Law Society; 1978–79	Succeeded by Stephen Marshall
Preceded by Sir Derek Bradbeer	President of the Law Society of England and Wales; 1988–89	Succeeded by David Ward
Preceded by David Williams	Senior Partner, Lawrence Tucketts; 1989–97	Succeeded by Tim Pyper
