= Thomas Lant =

English officer of arms

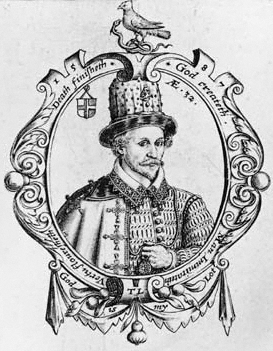
Thomas Lant in a 1587 engraving based on his own work

Thomas Lant (1554–1601) was a draftsman and long-serving officer of arms at the College of Arms in London. Lant was born in Gloucester and was one of seven children of Thomas and Mary Lant. When Lant was twelve years old, he became a page to Richard Cheney, the Bishop of Gloucester. When Cheney died in 1579, Lant again became a page, this time for Henry Cheney. It was through Lord Cheney that Lant became connected with Sir Philip Sidney. The two accompanied each other to the Low Countries in 1585. Lant was the draftsman of roll recording Sidney's funeral procession at St Paul's on 16 February 1587, this series of his drawings being engraved on copper plates (a new technique then) by Theodor de Bry for printing.

The coat of arms of the College of Arms from Lant's Roll of 1595

Following Sidney's death, Lant went to work for Sir Francis Walsingham, the secretary of state. It was through Walsingham that Lant secured an appointment as Portcullis Pursuivant of Arms in Ordinary at the College of Arms on 20 May 1588. It was as Portcullis that Lant wrote Observations and Collections Concerning the Office and Officers of Arms describing the College as "a company full of discord and envy." In 1595, Lant presented the queen a catalog of officers of arms known as Lant's Roll of which several copies survive. In 1596 Lant was involved in an argument with Ralph Brooke, York Herald of Arms in Ordinary. This led to Lant assaulting Brooke at the Middle Temple. Lant was created Windsor Herald of Arms in Ordinary on 23 October 1597.

Lant's date of death is uncertain. He was alive on 26 December 1600 but is thought to have died early in 1601. He and his wife Elizabeth, daughter of Richard Houghton, had two children, a daughter and a son. The son, Thomas, was born after his father's death and died on 18 May 1688 as rector of Hornsey, Middlesex. Lant's wife remarried on 28 September 1609 at the Savoy Chapel, Westminster. The union was with the alchemist Francis Anthony, and the marriage licence describes her as being 36 years old and the widow of "Thomas Lant, gent., deceased eight years since."

== Arms ==
Coat of arms of Thomas Lant
Crest A dove argent, beak & legs gules, standing on a serpent fretted proper. Escutcheon Per pale argent & gules, a cross engrailed counter-changed with a cinquefoil gules in dexter chief. Motto Prudentia et Simplicitate

== See also ==
- Heraldry
- Pursuivant
- Herald
