= Colin Cole (officer of arms) =

Sir Colin Cole KCB KCVO TD FSA
- Cole standing with John Brooke-Little on the steps of the College of Arms on the occasion of the Prince of Wales' Investiture in 1969.

Garter Principal King of Arms
- In office 1978–1992
- Monarch: Elizabeth II
- Preceded by: Sir Anthony Wagner
- Succeeded by: Conrad Swan

Personal details
- Born: 16 May 1922
- Died: 18 February 2001 (aged 78)

Sir Alexander Colin Cole KCB KCVO TD FSA FRHSC (Hon) (16 May 1922 – 18 February 2001) was a long serving officer of arms at the College of Arms in London. Eventually, he would rise to the rank of Garter Principal King of Arms, the highest heraldic office in England and Wales.

== Early life and education ==
Colin Cole was born in Surrey on 16 May 1922, the elder son of Edward Cole, a prosperous staples manufacturer. The family descends from John Cole, a yeoman in the parish of Twickenham, Middlesex, in the mid-17th century.

Cole was educated at Dulwich College (where his portrait stands in the stairwell to the Great Hall), Pembroke College, Cambridge, and Brasenose College, Oxford where he read law. During World War II he served as a captain in the Coldstream Guards.

He was called to the bar at Inner Temple in 1949 and pursued a legal career before aspiring to be an officer of arms.

In 1944, Cole married Valerie Card. They had four sons and three daughters.

== Heraldic career ==
In 1953 Cole was Fitzalan Pursuivant Extraordinary at the coronation of Elizabeth II of the United Kingdom. Shortly after this, he began his migration from the bar to the College of Arms. This came as a result of the revival, in 1954, of the High Court of Chivalry (which had not sat since 1737) to hear the case of Manchester Corporation versus Manchester Palace of Varieties for wrongfully displaying the city's coat of arms. Cole represented the Palace of Varieties but he lost the case.

After a short term as Fitzalan Pursuivant Extraordinary, Cole was appointed an officer in ordinary (a full member of the College of Arms) as Portcullis Pursuivant of Arms in Ordinary in 1957. He became Windsor Herald of Arms in Ordinary in 1966. Cole also served as the college's registrar and librarian from 1967 to 1974. He was appointed Garter Principal King of Arms four years later, in 1978 and held that position until 1992.

As Garter, Cole liberalised the rules devised by Sir Anthony Wagner for the admittance of new officers to the college. Previously they had always been university graduates who had also served a heraldic apprenticeship. Under Cole's leadership, this rule no longer applied and the majority of the pursuivants appointed had no pretensions to scholarship.

Cole's reputation for shrewdness and practical judgement benefited the college during his tenure. His heraldic practice became one of the largest and most successful of the twentieth century. In recognition of his achievements and service to the Crown, he was appointed a Knight Commander of the Royal Victorian Order (KCVO) in 1988 and a Knight Commander of the Order of the Bath (KCB) in 1992.

Many believe that Cole's chief achievement as Garter King of Arms was the part he played in the restoration of the college building. The structure of the building was overhauled and the brickwork and stone balustrades repaired under the direction of the estate agents Cluttons. This was one of the first times the repair of an important historic building had been entrusted to such a firm rather than to a specialist architect.

A member of the Court of Common Council from 1964, Cole became Sheriff in 1977 but had to turn down the opportunity to proceed to Lord Mayor as his duties as Garter would have clashed. He was a Master of the Scriveners, Liveryman of the Basketmakers, and on the Court of the Painter Stainers Companies. He was also a very active freemason.

== Coats of arms designed ==
- Margaret Thatcher and Denis Thatcher

== Honours and appointments ==
Colin Cole was appointed a Member of the Royal Victorian Order in 1977, was promoted to CVO in 1979, and KCVO in 1983. He was also made a Knight Commander of the Order of the Bath in 1992.

Military in bearing and vocabulary, Cole was proud of his rank of Lieutenant-Colonel, RARO (Brevet 1973). Until his knighthood in 1983, he called himself Colonel Cole on the strength of his position in the Honourable Artillery Company. He was honorary Colonel, 6/7 Battalion, the Queen's Regiment, from 1981 to 1986, President of The Royal Society of St George from 1982 to 1998, and Knight Principal of the Imperial Society of Knights Bachelor from 1995.

== Arms ==
Coat of arms of Colin Cole
Adopted 1957 Crest Issuant from flames proper a centaur forcene the human parts also proper the equine parts argent, crined and unguled or, drawing a bow of the same, bound and stringed gules the arrow or barbed and flighted also argent. Escutcheon Quarterly (1 & 4) Argent a chevron between three bulls passant guardant gules armed, unguled, membered and tails tufted or, each crowned with an ancient crown or (father's arms) (2) Argent a bull sable (statant) armed and unguled within a bordure also sable bezanty, (3) Argent on a chief azure three merlons or (Cole of Isleworth Syon). Motto Deum Cole Reginam Serva ("Worship God, Save the Queen") Orders the circlet of the Royal Victorian Order and Order of the Bath. Badge A bull's head erased gules armed or gorged with a collar ermine flory counter flory or attached thereto a line the stands alternatively argent and or reflexed over the neck and stapled also or. (Granted 1957). Previous versions Granted in 1957 in lieu of arms granted in 1944 to his father: Argent a chevron between three bulls passant guardant gules armed, unguled, membered and tails tufted or, each crowned with an ancient crown or.

== See also ==
- John Brooke-Little
- The College of Arms
- Heraldry

Heraldic offices
Preceded by The Lord Sinclair	Portcullis Pursuivant; 1957 – 1966	Succeeded by Michael Maclagan
Preceded by Richard Graham-Vivian	Windsor Herald; 1966 – 1978	Succeeded by Theobald Mathew
Preceded by Sir Anthony Wagner	Garter Principal King of Arms; 1978 – 1992	Succeeded by Sir Conrad Swan
Court offices
Preceded by Sir Anthony Wagner	Knight Principal of the Imperial Society of Knights Bachelor; 1983 – 1995	Succeeded by Sir Conrad Swan
