= Peter Spurrier =

Peter Brotherton Spurrier, OStJ (9 August 1942 – 13 January 2005) was an officer of arms at the College of Arms in London. He was appointed Portcullis Pursuivant of Arms in Ordinary in 1981, and York Herald of Arms in Ordinary in 1992. He retired from the College of Arms in May 1993. He was appointed an Esquire of the Order of St John of Jerusalem (EsqStJ) in 1987 and promoted to Officer (Brother) (OStJ) in 1990.

== See also ==
- Heraldry
- Herald

Heraldic offices
Preceded by Michael Maclagan	Portcullis Pursuivant; 1981 – 1992	Succeeded by William Hunt
Preceded by Sir Conrad Swan	York Herald; 1992 – 1993	Succeeded by Sir Henry Paston-Bedingfeld
