= Theobald Mathew (officer of arms) =

English officer of arms

Theobald David Mathew (7 April 1942 – 24 December 1998) was an officer of arms at the College of Arms in London.

Theobald Mathew was the son of solicitor Robert Mathew and Joan Young, and great-nephew of Sir Arthur Cochrane, Clarenceux King of Arms from 1928 to 1954. He was educated at Downside and Balliol College, Oxford.

Mathew was a Green Staff Officer at the investiture of the Prince of Wales in 1969. He was appointed Rouge Dragon Pursuivant of Arms in Ordinary on 24 March 1970, and promoted to Windsor Herald of Arms in Ordinary on 9 October 1978. Mathew resigned from this post in 1997. He had also been deputy treasurer of the College of Arms from 1978.

Theobald Mathew was made an Esquire of the Venerable Order of Saint John in 1977, and an Officer in 1986.

In 1998, he died at West Mersea, Essex, aged 56.

== Coat of Arms ==
Theobald Mathew was granted armorial bearings on 5 March 1981. These are blazoned

- (Arms) Or a lion rampant and a chief engrailed of three points flory sable
- (Crest) A heathcock sable beaked and legged gules supporting with the dexter claw an ostrich feather gold

== See also ==
- Heraldry
- Pursuivant
- Herald

== Notes ==
Heraldic offices
Preceded by Sir Conrad Swan	Rouge Dragon Pursuivant; 1970 – 1978	Succeeded by Patric Dickinson
Preceded by Sir Colin Cole	Windsor Herald; 1978 – 1997	Succeeded by William Hunt
