= Windsor Herald =

Officer of the College of Arms

- The heraldic badge of Windsor Herald of Arms in Ordinary
- Heraldic tradition: Gallo-British
- Jurisdiction: England, Wales and Northern Ireland
- Governing body: College of Arms

Windsor Herald of Arms in Ordinary is an officer of arms at the College of Arms in London.

It has been suggested that the office was instituted specifically for the Order of the Garter in 1348, or that it predates the Order and was in use as early as 1338. However, it is more likely that it dates from 1364, when a pursuivant of Edward III, on bringing the king news of the victory at Auray, was rewarded by promotion to the rank of herald with the title Windsor. Thereafter there is little mention of the office before 1419, when Windsor Herald was sent to the Duke of Brittany. Since that time, the office has been maintained. The badge of office is the sunburst badge of Edward III (Edward of Windsor) royally crowned.

The best-known Windsor Herald was the 17th-century antiquarian, Elias Ashmole. The office is vacant.

== Holders of the office ==
Arms	Name	Date of appointment	Ref
	Andrew (surname unknown)	(Edward III)	
	Stephen (surname unknown)	(1366)	
	Thomas More	(Henry VI)	
	Robert Ashwell	(Henry VI)	
	John Ferrant	(Edward IV)	
	John Ballard	(Edward IV)	
	Thomas Holme	1461–1468	
	John More	1468–1486	
	Richard Slacke	1486–1502	
	Thomas Benolte	1504–1510	
	Francis Dyes	1510–1524	
	Thomas Wall	1524–1529	
	Charles Wriothesley	1529–1565	
	Richard Turpin	1565–1583	
	Nicholas Dethick	1583–1597	
	Thomas Lant	1597–1602	
	Richard St George	1602–1604	
	Samuel Thompson	1617–1624	
	Augustine Vincent	1624–1626	
	John Bradshaw	1626–1633	
	Edward Norgate	1633–1650	
	Elias Ashmole	1660–1675	
	John Dugdale	1676–1686	
	Henry Ball	1686–1687	
	Thomas Holdford	1687–1690	
	Peers Mauduit	1690–1726	
	James Whorwood	1726–1736	
	John Kettell	1736–1746	
	Richard Mawson	1746–1746	
	Thomas Thornborough	1746–1757	
	Henry Hill	1757–1774	
	George Harrison	1774–1784	
	Francis Townsend	1784–1819	
	Francis Martin	1819–1839	
	Robert Laurie	1839–1849	
	George Rogers-Harrison	1849–1880	
	Sir William Weldon	1880–1894	
	William Lindsay	1894–1919	
	Sir Algar Howard	1919–1931	
	Alfred Butler	1931–1946	
	Richard Graham-Vivian	1947–1966	
	Sir Colin Cole	1966–1978	
	Theobald Mathew	1978–1997	
	William George Hunt	1999–2017	
	John Allen-Petrie	2019–2026	
	Vacant	2026–present	

== See also ==
- Heraldry
- Officer of arms
