= Conrad Swan =

Canadian-British officer in arms (1924–2019)

Sir Conrad Swan KCVO KGCN FSA FRHSC
- Arms of Sir Conrad Swan

Garter Principal King of Arms
- In office 1992–1995
- Monarch: Elizabeth II
- Preceded by: Sir Colin Cole
- Succeeded by: Sir Peter Gwynn-Jones

Personal details
- Born: 13 May 1924 Duncan, British Columbia, Canada
- Died: 10 January 2019 (aged 94)

Sir Conrad Marshall John Fisher Swan (13 May 1924 – 10 January 2019) was a Canadian-British herald who was a long-serving officer of arms at the College of Arms in London. Having been first appointed to work at the College in 1962, he rose to the office of Garter Principal King of Arms in 1992, a position he held until 1995. He was the first Canadian ever to be appointed to the College of Arms.

== Early life ==
Conrad Swan was born in 1924 at Duncan, British Columbia, Canada, to Major Henry Peter Swan and Edna Hanson Magdalen (née Green), daughter of a Folkestone master tailor from a Baptist family formerly involved in the Hertfordshire straw-hat making industry during the early 19th century. Henry Swan, the local doctor, was of Polish-Lithuanian origin, and had changed the family name from Swiecicki; Swan claimed descent from the Polish noble family of Święcicki (Coat of arms of Jastrzębiec) via a hereditary steward of King John II Casimir Vasa of Poland in 1648.

Swan devoted much of his life to travelling. Having decided to make a lifetime career in the Indian Army, Swan was sent by the India Office (the UK governmental office responsible for India at the time) to the School of Oriental and African Studies, University of London. Having completed the course there, he proceeded to India and received an emergency commission on 19 November 1944 as a second lieutenant in the 3rd Battalion of the Madras Regiment, the oldest in the country. Promoted to war-substantive lieutenant on 10 May 1945, Indian Independence in 1947 caused him to make other decisions "it being the end of a chapter". He left the Indian Army with the rank of captain. Following his retirement from the Indian Army, he went directly back to Canada to take a BA and MA at the University of Western Ontario (Assumption College). During this time, he developed a keen interest in Commonwealth affairs, which brought him back to Britain, where he acquired his doctorate from Cambridge University in 1955.

Swan spent six years (1955–1961) lecturing in history at the Assumption University of Windsor, Ontario, of which he was also a University Beadle. As guest lecturer, he visited many universities, not only in North America but in every continent except Antarctica, "the penguins haven't invited me yet".

== Heraldic career ==
In addition to his educational achievements, Swan developed an exceptional heraldic career. He was first appointed Rouge Dragon Pursuivant of Arms in Ordinary in 1962 and six years later became York Herald of Arms in Ordinary. In these capacities, he was among the Earl Marshal's staff for the State Funeral of Sir Winston Churchill in 1965, the Investiture of the Prince of Wales in 1969, and was Gentleman Usher-in-Waiting to Pope John Paul II during his visit to the United Kingdom in 1982.

Swan was appointed Garter Principal King of Arms in 1992 on the retirement of Sir Alexander Colin Cole. His own retirement came in 1995, after having been diagnosed with cancer. At the time, some allegations were made in a newspaper article concerning his decision, in his capacity as Genealogist of the British Association of the Sovereign Military Order of Malta, with regard to the grade in which one of his sons-in-law should enter the Order. He denied these allegations, noting that he had never been interviewed by any reporter on this subject.

Sir Conrad Swan was the first herald to execute official duties in-tabard across the Atlantic Ocean and in the Southern Hemisphere. He did so in Bermuda in 1969 and in Brisbane in 1977. He was instrumental in the creation of the Honours System of Antigua and Barbuda, and between 1964 and 1967, Swan was an adviser to the Prime Minister of Canada on the establishment of the National Flag of Canada and the Order of Canada. Swan also took a special interest in Saskatchewan, helping the province to obtain a full coat of arms from the Queen in 1986 and a new Great Seal in 1991. He advised the province on the establishment of the Saskatchewan Order of Merit in 1985 and the Saskatchewan Volunteer Medal in 1995 and the recent expansion of the provincial honours system (notably the Commemorative Medal for the Centennial of Saskatchewan). He was also responsible for the design and granting of badges (crests) for each of the colleges of the University of Saskatchewan.

A keen scholar and publicist, Swan wrote a number of books and articles on heraldic, sigillographic and related subjects. He was a member of several international societies and organisations and was a founder of the Royal Heraldry Society of Canada and the Heraldic Garden in Britain.

== Honours and appointments ==
Swan was appointed an Officer of the Order of St. John (OStJ) on 8 August 1972, with promotions to Commander (CStJ) on 11 December 1975 and to Knight (KStJ) on 6 April 1976. He was appointed a Member (fourth class) of the Royal Victorian Order in the 1978 Birthday Honours list; he and all other living Members (fourth class) were re-graded as Lieutenants (LVO) in 1984. He was promoted to Commander (CVO) in the 1986 New Year Honours list and was knighted by the Queen as a Knight Commander (KCVO) in the 1994 Birthday Honours. As Swan was a dual Canadian-British national, his knighthood was theoretically subject to being blocked by the Canadian government due to the 1919 Nickle Resolution, although, in the event, the Liberal Canadian ministry did not oppose the grant.

He was also a Knight Grand Cross of the Order of the Nation of Antigua and Barbuda (KGCN), Knight of Honour and Devotion of the Order of Malta, Cross of Commander of the Order of Merit of the Republic of Poland, Knight's Cross of the Order of the Grand Duke Gediminas (Lithuania), Knight Grand Cross of Justice of the Sacred Military Constantinian Order of Saint George, Knight Grand Cross of the Royal Order of Francis I (GCFO) and Knight Grand Cross of the Royal Order of the Lion of Rwanda.

He was also a Knight of the Most Venerable Order of St. John of Jerusalem and Knight Principal of the Imperial Society of Knights Bachelor (1995–2000); Commander (with Star) of the Royal Norwegian Order of Merit; Grand Cross with Grand Collar of the Imperial Order of the Holy Trinity (Ethiopia); Coronation Medal of the King of Tonga. He also received the Commemorative Medal for the Centennial of Saskatchewan in 2005.

== Family ==
In 1957, Swan married Lady Hilda Susan Mary Northcote (born 23 July 1937 – died 4 December 1995), Serving Sister Most Venerable Order of St. John, Dame of Honour and Devotion Sovereign Military Order of Malta; Dame of Justice (SMO) of Constantine St. George; and President, St. John's Ambulance Society Suffolk.

Lady Hilda was the younger daughter of Henry Stafford Northcote, the 3rd Earl of Iddesleigh, and granddaughter of author Marie Adelaide Belloc Lowndes. She died in Boxford, Suffolk when she was hit by a car, which did not stop. She was 58 years old.

They had five children:

- Mary Elizabeth Magdalen Le Strange Herring (née Swan) (b. 1959)
- Hilda Juliana Mary Galvin (née Swan) (b. 1961)
- Catherine Sylveria Mary Kelsey (née Swan) (1962–2021)
- Andrew Conrad Henry Joseph Swan (b. 1964)
- Anastasia Cecilia Mary Hatvany (née Swan) (b. 1966)

== A King From Canada ==
Swan's autobiography was released in 2005. A King From Canada was published by The Memoir Club and featured a foreword by Robert Watt, former Chief Herald of Canada.

== Published works ==
- Canada: Symbols of Sovereignty, University of Toronto Press, 1977, ISBN 978-0-8020-5346-6
- A King from Canada, The Memoir Club, 2005, ISBN 978-1-84104-072-1
- The Royal Encyclopedia (48 articles), Macmillan Press, 1991, ISBN 0-333-53810-2

== Arms ==
Coat of arms of Conrad Swan
Adopted Ancestral arms confirmed 7 January 1967 Crest Out of a Szlachta coronet proper or a sparrow hawk rising gules holding in the dexter claw a horseshoe inverted enclosing a cross formy or Escutcheon Azure a cross formy within a horseshoe inverted or, a bordure compony counter compony or and gules Motto Numquam Cedamus ("We will never give up") Orders the circlet of the Royal Victorian Order as KCVO. Symbolism Derived from the Polish-Lithuanian Jastrzębiec coat of arms of which he is descended.

== See also ==
- Pursuivant
- Herald
- King of Arms

Heraldic offices
Preceded by Robin de la Lanne-Mirrlees	Rouge Dragon Pursuivant; 1962–1968	Succeeded by Theobald Mathew
Preceded by The Lord Sinclair	York Herald; 1968–1992	Succeeded by Peter Spurrier
Preceded by Sir Colin Cole	Garter Principal King of Arms; 1992 – 1995	Succeeded by Sir Peter Gwynn-Jones
Preceded by ?	Registrar of the College of Arms ? – 1992	Succeeded by Hubert Chesshyre
Court offices
Preceded by Sir Colin Cole	Knight Principal of the Imperial Society of Knights Bachelor; 1995-2000	Succeeded by Sir Richard Gaskell
