= Worshipful Company of Makers of Playing Cards =

Livery company of the City of London

Coordinates: 51.48611°N 0.01483°W

- Motto: Corde Recto Elati Omnes; Latin for with an upright heart all will be exalted
- Location: 35 Ascot Way, Bicester, OXON
- Date of formation: 1628; 398 years ago
- Company association: Individuals connected with playing cards including makers, collectors, dealers, bridge players, magicians and others.
- Order of precedence: 75th
- Master of company: Giles D Stockton ACII ALCM
- Website: www.makersofplayingcards.org

The Worshipful Company of Makers of Playing Cards is one of the livery companies of the City of London, incorporated in 1628, and ranking at No.75 in the order of precedence. It is limited to 150 members, and its livery colours are red and white.

== History ==
The company was incorporated by royal charter granted by Charles I with effect from 22 October 1628, and was granted livery status on 27 November 1792 with a limit of a hundred members. On 21 July 1903 the limit was increased to 150. In order of precedence, the Makers of Playing Cards are No. 75, and the livery colours are red and white.

The company was created in order to regulate and control the importation of cheap playing cards, to protect the card makers and their families, and to maintain quality. The Crown received the benefit of the duties levied by the company agreeing to pay a tax on all packs, and the ace of spades was chosen to show the tax. Every maker of playing cards had to have a mark of his own enrolled to indicate recognition of his name. The excise duty on playing cards was abolished on 4 April 1960, as the cost of administration had become excessive.

The true origin of the company's coat of arms is unknown, but an official grant of arms was presented on 31 March 1982. The shield shows the four suits with an upright hand holding an ace of hearts. The motto is Corde Recto Elati Omnes meaning 'with an upright heart all will be exalted'.

== Traditions ==
Since 1882, the company has designed and presented an annual double pack of playing cards to each liveryman and freeman of the company at the installation of the new master. Since 1888, a portrait of the master has appeared at the centre of the ace of spades, and the design chosen and developed by the master has traditionally commemorated an event of importance occurring in the twelve months of the master's year in office, such as the company's first lord mayor and sheriff, or some royal or historical celebration. The company maintains and expands its world-famous collection of playing cards first presented by past master Henry Phillips in 1907 and housed by arrangement with the City of London at the London Metropolitan Archives. The company is undertaking a project to make digitised images of the collection available for internet access.

== The Charitable Trust ==
Formed in 1943, in the year of the mastership of Lindsay Cutler, and administered by trustees, the funds accumulated by members' donations and fundraising generate income used to help those under the age of 25 for educational purposes as well as financial aid to overcome hardship and distress. Benefactors include the Lord Mayor's Appeal and various hospices.

== The company today ==
Since the formation of the company in the Middle Ages, the production and use of playing cards in London has declined. Today the company still has cardmakers as members. However the company has many other members connected with playing cards in some way including card collectors, dealers, bridge players, magicians and other professions.

The company has several affiliations recognising the role that the Armed Services provide. Their affiliations include the naval destroyer HMS Diamond, and 19 Company; Middlesex & NW London Army Cadet Force and also 82 squadron Royal Air Force Air Cadets.
