= Michael Maclagan =

British historian and antiquary (1914–2003)

Michael Maclagan CVO OStJ FSA FRHistS (14 April 1914 – 13 August 2003) was a British historian, antiquary and herald. He was Fellow and Tutor in Modern History at Trinity College, Oxford, for more than forty years, a long-serving officer of arms, and Lord Mayor of Oxford 1970–71.

== Career ==
Maclagan was born in London and educated at Winchester College and Christ Church, Oxford. He graduated from Christ Church with a first class degree in 1935, and was awarded the Gladstone Memorial Exhibition. After two years as a lecturer at Christ Church, he was elected a Fellow of Trinity College in 1939 (the last Fellow to be so elected before the outbreak of World War II). At both Winchester and Oxford he was a member of the Officer Training Corps; and he served as president of the Oxford University Archaeological Society.

=== World War II ===
In February 1941, Maclagan was commissioned a second lieutenant in the 16th/5th Lancers, Royal Armoured Corps. He spent much of the war in staff and intelligence jobs: for a period he was in Cairo, but he was subsequently posted to Military Operations in the War Office in London, where his proficiency in Italian and Serbo-Croat stood him in good stead. He ultimately reached the rank of major.

=== Post-war ===
In 1946, Maclagan returned to Trinity College, where he remained as Fellow and Tutor in Modern History until his retirement in 1981. For many years he shared teaching duties with the early modern scholar John Phillips Cooper (1920–1978). He held various college offices (including Dean, Librarian, Senior Tutor, Vice-President, and steward of the Senior Common Room); was Senior Proctor for the University in 1954–5; and he also served as Senior Librarian (1960–70) and Trustee (1970–99) of the Oxford Union.

Outside the University, he served as a university-appointed alderman on Oxford City Council, and held the offices of Sheriff in 1964–5, and Lord Mayor in 1970–71. He served as Chairman of the Oxford Diocesan Advisory Committee, 1961–85; and as Master of the Scriveners' Company, 1988–9.

He had lifelong interests in heraldry and genealogy, and served both as a private officer of arms and at the College of Arms in London. He began his heraldic career in 1948 with an appointment as Slains Pursuivant of Arms, and held that office until 1970. This appointment was made by the Chief of the Name and Arms of Hay after the resurgence of private armorial officers following World War II.

In 1953 Maclagan was made an Officer Brother of the Venerable Order of Saint John, and served as a Gold Staff Officer at the Coronation and as a Green Staff Officer at the Investiture of the Prince of Wales in 1969. In 1970, he was appointed Portcullis Pursuivant of Arms in Ordinary at the College of Arms. He held this post for 10 years until his promotion to the office of Richmond Herald on 14 July 1980. Maclagan held this last office until his retirement in 1989, at the age of 75.

== Scholarship ==
Maclagan was characterised by his obituary-writer in The Times as an antiquary, rather than an historian. Patric Dickinson, in the Independent, called him "the quintessential Oxford don – a scholar of the old school, erudite, antiquarian and stylish", who "seemed to have strayed from an earlier age". He had an eclectic range of historical interests spanning all periods (particularly, but far from exclusively, in the fields of genealogy, heraldry and bibliography); he was more concerned with arcane detail, for which he had a remarkable memory, than with grand narrative; and he tended to pursue topics and projects which appealed to him, rather than those which might advance his career. All this meant that he published less than he might have done.

He was a proficient linguist, fluent in Greek, Latin, French, German, Italian and Serbo-Croat, and with some knowledge of Arabic. His first book, in 1949, was a translation of part of the Venerable Bede's Ecclesiastical History of the English Nation.

Many of his core interests were genealogical. He had a longstanding expertise in the history of the medieval Anglo-Norman family of de Clare, although little of this came to print. His principal foray into modern history was a well-received biography of a kinsman (through his mother), the first Earl Canning, who was Governor-General of India during the Indian Rebellion of 1857 and first Viceroy of India. He is best known to students of royal and noble genealogies and royal families as co-author (with Jiří Louda, who compiled and drew the tables, while Maclagan wrote the text) of the best-selling Lines of Succession, first published in 1981, and subsequently reprinted and revised on several occasions.

He was also interested in Byzantine history, and in 1968 published a history of Constantinople. For many years he spent part of his summer vacation as a popular lecturer on Swan Hellenic cruises in the eastern Mediterranean.

He was a keen bibliophile, and built up an extensive collection of rare books. In 1960 he published an edition of Bishop Richard de Bury's Philobiblon, one of the earliest studies of librarianship. He was a meticulous indexer: his biography of Canning was awarded the Society of Indexers' Wheatley Medal in 1962; and in 1988 he compiled the index for Francis Jones's Catalogue of Welsh Manuscripts in the College of Arms.

== Family ==
Michael Maclagan was the son of Sir Eric Maclagan (1879–1951), for many years director of the Victoria and Albert Museum. His mother, Helen Elizabeth Lascelles (10 October 1879 – 19 October 1942), who married Eric Maclagan on 8 July 1913, was a granddaughter of the 4th Earl of Harewood: she was a sister of Sir Alan "Tommy" Lascelles, Private Secretary to King George VI and a second cousin once removed to the 7th Earl of Harewood who married Mary, Princess Royal, only daughter of King George V and sister to King George VI.

Maclagan's paternal grandfather was the Most Reverend William Dalrymple Maclagan (1826–1910), Archbishop of York from 1891 to 1908, and the cleric who had crowned Queen Alexandra in 1902. His paternal grandmother, second wife of the Archbishop, was the Honourable Augusta Anne Barrington (1836–1915), daughter of the 6th Viscount Barrington. (Augusta Maclagan had money settled upon her when she married Maclagan, then Bishop of Lichfield, in 1878: about half her money was settled on her son Eric when he married in 1913, giving him and his wife a considerable degree of financial independence.)

Through both his mother and his paternal grandmother, Maclagan thus had connections to several British aristocratic families. The Honourable Augusta Maclagan was a great-granddaughter of the 9th Earl of Strathmore and Kinghorne; thus making her grandson Michael Maclagan a distant kinsman to the Queen.

== Personal life ==
Maclagan was twice married. His first marriage in 1939 to a cousin, Brenda Alexander, was dissolved by divorce in 1946. His second marriage in 1949 to Jean Elizabeth Brooksbank Garnett lasted almost 54 years; she died on 3 August 2003. He died ten days later on the day of her funeral. Maclagan had a son by his first marriage, and a son (who died, aged 26, in 1984) and two daughters by his second marriage.

== Portrait ==
On his retirement from Trinity in 1981, a portrait of Maclagan in his herald's tabard by Paul Brason was commissioned by the Trinity Society and presented to the college: it is now hung in the screens passage to the College dining hall.

== Publications ==
- "The Family of Dormer in Oxfordshire and Buckinghamshire", Oxoniensia, vol. 11–12 (1946–47), pp. 90–101.
- Venerable Bede, The Ecclesiastical History of the English Nation: books I and II, translated into English with notes and introduction by Michael Maclagan. Oxford: Blackwell, 1949.
- With J. P. Wells. Oxford City Libraries, 1854–1954. Oxford, 1954.
- Trinity College, 1555–1955. Oxford: Oxford University Press, 1955.
- "Genealogy and Heraldry in the Sixteenth and Seventeenth Centuries", in Levi Fox (ed.), English Historical Scholarship in the Sixteenth and Seventeenth Centuries, Dugdale Society (London: Oxford University Press, 1956), pp. 31–48.
- "Governors General of India: 3, 'Clemency' Canning", History Today, vol. 9 (1959), pp. 233–42.
- Ricardus d’Aungerville, Bishop of Durham, Philobiblon, text and translation of E.C. Thomas, edited with a foreword by Michael Maclagan. Oxford: Blackwell, privately printed 1960; published 1970.
- "Clemency" Canning: Charles John, 1st Earl Canning, Governor-General and Viceroy of India, 1856–1862. London: Macmillan, 1962.
- "The White Mutiny", in H. R. Trevor-Roper (ed.), Essays in British History presented to Sir Keith Feiling (New York & London, 1964), pp. 271–301.
- The City of Constantinople. London: Thames & Hudson, 1968.
- With Jiří Louda. Lines of Succession: Heraldry of the Royal Families of Europe. London: Orbis & New York: Clarkson Potter, 1981; revised and updated edition, 1991; adapted small-format edition, 2002. (The 1981 American edition was published as Heraldry of the Royal Families of Europe, but later editions took the European title.)
- "Genealogy and the Medieval Historian", in English Genealogical Congress: selected papers given at the Congresses of 1978 and 1984 (London, 1986), pp. 7–14.
- "The Ancestry of the English Beaumonts", in L. L. Brook (ed.), Studies in Genealogy and Family History in tribute to Charles Evans on the occasion of his eightieth birthday (Salt Lake City, 1989), pp. 190–96.

== Sources ==
- "Michael Maclagan", Trinity College Oxford Report (1981), pp. 7–8.
- "Lives in Brief" (Obituary), The Times, 21 August 2003
- Obituary, by P. L. Dickinson, The Independent, 2 September 2003
- Obituary, The Daily Telegraph, 16 September 2003
- Canning genealogy, showing Maclagan-Lascelles marriage
- Lascelles family, Lascelles family genealogy
- The College of Arms
- CUHAGS Officer of Arms Index

Heraldic offices
Preceded by Sir Colin Cole	Portcullis Pursuivant; 1970 – 1980	Succeeded by Peter Spurrier
Preceded by John Brooke-Little	Richmond Herald; 1980 – 1989	Succeeded by Patric Dickinson
