= George Bellew =

British officer of arms

The Honourable Sir George Bellew KCB, KCVO, KStJ, FSA
- Photographed by Cecil Beaton in 1953

Garter Principal King of Arms
- In office 1950–1961
- Monarchs: George VI; Elizabeth II
- Preceded by: Sir Algar Howard
- Succeeded by: Sir Anthony Wagner

Personal details
- Born: 13 December 1899
- Died: 6 February 1993 (aged 92)

Sir George Rothe Bellew, KCB, KCVO, KStJ, FSA (13 December 1899 – 6 February 1993), styled The Honourable after 1935, was a long-serving herald at the College of Arms in London. Educated at the University of Oxford, he was appointed Portcullis Pursuivant in 1922. Having been Somerset Herald for 24 years, he was promoted to the office of Garter Principal King of Arms in 1950, the highest heraldic office in England and Wales. He served in that capacity until his resignation in 1961. As Garter, Bellew oversaw the funeral of George VI, proclaimed the late King's daughter, Elizabeth II, as Queen and took a leading role in the organisation of her Coronation in 1953. After his retirement, Bellew was Secretary of the Order of the Garter (until 1974) and Knight Principal of the Imperial Society of Knights Bachelor (until 1962). He lived for many years at Dower House in Old Windsor, Berkshire, but later moved to Farnham and died in 1993, aged 93.

== Life ==
=== Early life and heraldic career before 1950 ===
Born in Dublin, Ireland, on 13 December 1899, Bellew was the son of the Hon. Richard Eustace Bellew by his second wife Gwendoline Marie Josephine, elder daughter of William Reginald Joseph Fitzherbert Herbert Huddleston of Clytha. His father was the younger son of the second Baron Bellew. Bellew's elder brother, Edward Bellew, 5th Baron Bellew, inherited the barony; because their father had died before inheriting the title, Bellew and his other siblings took the style of the son of a baron by a Royal Warrant of Precedence in 1935. The same year, he married Ursula Kennard Cull (died 1994), eldest daughter of Anders Eric Knös Cull (died 1968), a merchant banker and founder of Cull & Co., of Warfield House, Berkshire, and had one son, Richard George Bellew (born 1936); through her mother, Ursula Bellew was a descendant of James Robinson Planché, sometime Somerset Herald.

Following schooling at Wellington College, Bellew went up to Christ Church, Oxford. He arrived at the College of Arms in 1922, when he was appointed Portcullis Pursuivant. After four years in that capacity, he was promoted to the office of Somerset Herald and went on to serve as the College’s registrar from 1935 to 1946. His heraldic career was interrupted by World War II, when Bellew rose to the rank of Squadron Leader in the Royal Air Force Volunteer Reserve and was mentioned in despatches. Having spent 24 years as Somerset Herald, he succeeded Sir Algar Howard as Garter Principal King of Arms in 1950, the highest position in the College of Arms and the leading herald in England and Wales.

=== Gartership ===
As Garter, Bellew was tasked with overseeing the State Funeral of George VI in 1952, but many of the details had been prepared in advance. Along with officially proclaiming the King’s successor, Elizabeth II, he was also effectively the senior assistant to the Earl Marshal in organising the new Queen’s Coronation, a complex and demanding operation. He advocated (in opposition to most of the Coronation Executive Committee) the broadcast of the service on television and designed the heraldic statues which guarded Westminster Abbey's doors during the ceremony—a "notable success", according to The Independent. A Knight Bachelor since 1950, he was appointed a Knight Commander of the Royal Victorian Order in 1953 in recognition for his service during the Coronation.

Bellew's Gartership also witnessed changes to the fabric of the College of Arms. Although it had survived the Blitz, structural problems with the roof and brickwork forced the heralds to decide between leaving the College's buildings on Queen Victoria Street or attempting expensive repairs. In 1954, they approached the Ministry of Works to ask for financial assistance in the building work; the Ministry agreed to cover half the cost. A successful public appeal for the remaining funds followed and the restoration work carried out. The College of Arms Trust was established in 1956 to oversee funds for the building's maintenance.

Garter is ex officio the officer of arms of the Order of the Garter, England's senior Order of Chivalry. The post of Secretary of the Order had been created in the early 20th century and had been held by courtiers since then, not always in friendly relations with other officers. In 1952, Bellew and most of the chapter came to an agreement that a herald be appointed to the post; after appealing to Sir Alan Lascelles, the Sovereign's Private Secretary, the Queen agreed and Anthony Wagner was given the position.

=== Retirement ===
Having served as Garter for 11 years, Bellew retired in 1961 and was succeeded by Anthony Wagner, then Richmond Herald. (Note: Wagner wrote that Bellew had been appointed Garter for life. He also said that "though I [Wagner] knew I was due for the next appointment, I did not know whether, or when, he [Bellew] would resign" (Wagner 1988, p. 150).) He then served as Secretary of the Order of the Garter until 1974, which included responsibility for the Orders' finances, and received a third knighthood when he was appointed a Knight Commander of the Order of the Bath. He was a Fellow of the Society of Antiquaries and Knight of the Order of St John. Having been Knight Principal of the Imperial Society of Knights Bachelor from 1957 to 1962, he was its Deputy Knight Principal from then until 1971. In the aftermath of World War II, he and his wife purchased Woodside Dower House in Old Windsor, Berkshire; then a ruin, he took a keen interest in renovating it and hosting parties there. While Secretary of the Order of the Garter, he entertained friends and colleagues at the house after the order's annual service in June. In later years, he lived at The Grange in Farnham and died on 6 February 1993.

== Legacy and appraisal ==
Bellew's successor as Garter, Sir Anthony Wagner, referred to him in his 1988 memoirs; he wrote that Bellew seemed "in early years a temperamental, combative Irishman not easy to live with though always possessed of great feeling for ceremonial and heraldic design and a skillful pen and pencil. In later years I have found him ever more charming". According to The Independent, Bellew enjoyed creating colourful grants of arms, drew inspiration from medieval heraldry and allowed multi-coloured wreaths to be used and adorned with badges for the first time in English heraldry. As Garter, he managed the financial affairs of the College well, maintaining "a firm hand on the tiller", and, when faced with the task of organising the Coronation, his knowledge of tradition was complemented by his eye for design: "At heart he was a designer, an artist and a perfectionist in all things", remarks his obituary in The Times.

== Publications ==
- Bellew, Sir George Rothe (n.d.). St. George's Chapel, Windsor and the History of the Most Noble Order of the Garter. London: Pitkin Pictorials. OCLC 200062583
- — (1960). The Story of Salisbury Hall. W. J. Goldsmith. OCLC 30242508
- — (1971). Britain's Kings and Queens. London: Pitkin Pictorials. ISBN 9780853720553. OCLC 1031506

== Likenesses ==
- Sir George Rothe Bellew by Cecil Beaton, bromide print on white card mount, 1953 7^{3}/_{8} in. × 7^{1}/_{2} in. (186 mm × 191 mm). Held in the Photographs Collection at the National Portrait Gallery (given by Cecil Beaton, 1968).

== Arms ==
Coat of arms of George Bellew
Crest An arm in armour embowed & holding a sword proper. Escutcheon Sable fretty or. Motto Tout d'en haut ("All from above") Orders the circlet of the Royal Victorian Order and Order of the Bath.

== See also ==
- Heraldry
- Officer of arms

Heraldic offices
Preceded by Keith Murray	Portcullis Pursuivant; 1922 – 1926	Succeeded by Alfred Butler
Preceded by Everard Green	Somerset Herald; 1926 – 1950	Succeeded by Michael Trappes-Lomax
Preceded by Sir Algar Howard	Garter Principal King of Arms; 1950 – 1961	Succeeded by Sir Anthony Wagner
