= John Allen-Petrie =

English officer of arms

John Michael Allen-Petrie OBE
- Born: July 5, 1980; Canada
- Education: Collège Jean-de-Brébeuf, Sciences Po, London School of Economics (MSc), Oriel College, Oxford (MSc)
- Occupations: Genealogist, herald
- Employer: College of Arms
- Known for: Windsor Herald at the College of Arms
- Term: 2019–2026
- Predecessor: William George Hunt
- Awards: OBE

John Michael Allen-Petrie (born 5 July 1980) is a genealogist who served as Windsor Herald at the College of Arms in London between 2019 and 2026.

== Life ==
Born in Canada, he attended Collège Jean-de-Brébeuf at Montreal, then Sciences Po in Paris, before pursuing further studies at LSE (MSc) and Oriel College, Oxford (MSc).

An analyst with the Bank of England from 2008 until 2015, Allen-Petrie joined the College of Arms as Rouge Croix Pursuivant in 2013, being promoted Windsor Herald of Arms in Ordinary in 2019. He resigned in 2026.

A Liveryman of the Drapers' Company, he was elected a Common Councilman for Billingsgate Ward (2018–22).

== Honours and awards ==
- OBE: Officer of the Most Excellent Order of the British Empire (2021)
- CStJ: Commander of the Most Venerable Order of Saint John (2023)
- Queen Elizabeth II Platinum Jubilee Medal
- King Charles III Coronation Medal
- Royal Household Badge

Allen-Petrie processed as Windsor Herald at the coronation of Charles III and Camilla.

=== Arms ===
Coat of arms of John Allen-Petrie
Crest Within a Coronet a Demi-Stag Or attired and unguled Azure transfixed by an Arrow bendwise Or barbed and flighted Azure Escutcheon Azure a Saltire embattled parted Or Motto Je te plumerai (Ang: "I shall pluck you") Orders Surrounding the Shield, the Circlet of the Order of St John:

Heraldic offices
Preceded by David White	Rouge Croix Pursuivant; 2013 – 2019	Succeeded by Thomas Johnston
Preceded by William Hunt	Windsor Herald; 2019 – 2026	Incumbent
