= College of Arms =

Corporation responsible for heraldry in England and Wales

Coordinates: 51°30′44″N 0°05′56″W

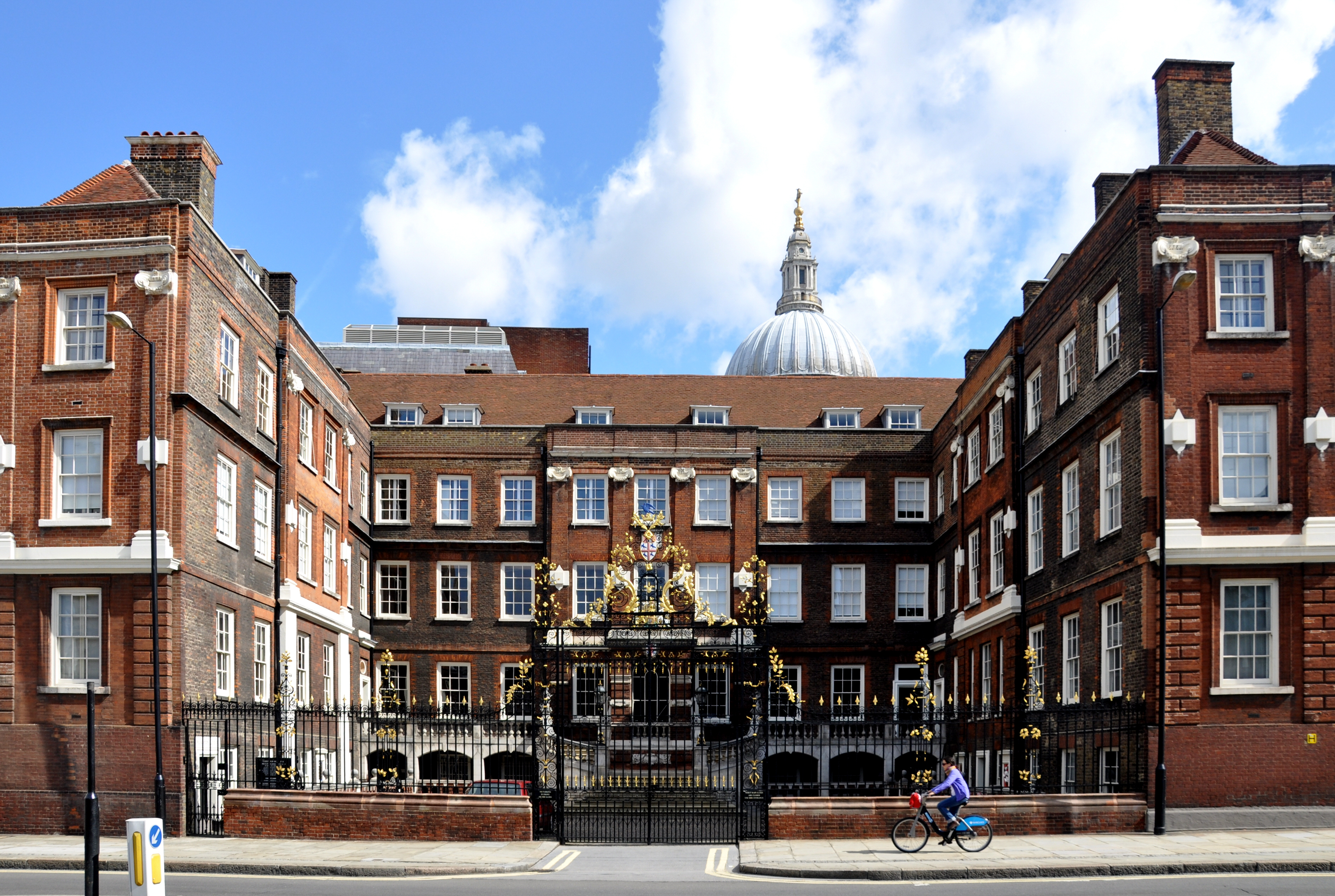
- The College of Arms in London, with the dome of St Paul's Cathedral behind
- Type: Royal Corporation
- Founded: 2 March 1484 (incorporated); 18 July 1555 (reincorporated)
- Founder: Richard III of England; Mary I of England & Philip II of Spain
- Headquarters: 130 Queen Victoria Street; City of London; EC4V 4BT
- Area served: England, Wales, Northern Ireland, Australia and New Zealand
- Key people: Edward Fitzalan-Howard, 18th Duke of Norfolk, Hereditary Earl Marshal; James Peill, Garter Principal King of Arms
- Services: Recording, granting and regulation of heraldry, coats of arms and pedigrees
- Parent: Royal Household of the United Kingdom
- Website: college-of-arms.gov.uk

The College of Arms (or Heralds' College) is the heraldic authority for England, Wales, Northern Ireland, and some Commonwealth realms. It has no jurisdiction in Scotland, as the heraldic authority for Scotland is the Court of the Lord Lyon. The College is a royal corporation consisting of professional officers of arms who act on behalf of the Crown in matters of heraldry, including the granting of new coats of arms; genealogical research; and the recording of pedigrees. The College is also responsible for matters relating to the flying of flags on land, and maintains the official registers of flags and other national symbols. It is also involved in the planning of ceremonial occasions such as coronations, state funerals, the annual Garter Service, and the State Opening of Parliament. The officers of arms accompany the monarch on many of these occasions.

King Richard III of England founded the College by royal charter in 1484. The College has been located in the City of London since its foundation, and has been at its present site on Queen Victoria Street since 1555. (Note: The College originally occupied a property between St Paul's and Thames St, known as Derby Place, which burned in the Great Fire. The replacement building, known simply as the College of Arms or Herald's College, was built on the same property. When Queen Victoria St was built it crossed the south end of the College's property; the building was then remodelled to front onto the new street.) There are thirteen officers or heralds, who are appointed by the monarch: three Kings of Arms, six Heralds of Arms, and four Pursuivants of Arms. There are also seven officers extraordinary, who take part in ceremonial occasions but are not part of the College. The entire corporation is overseen by the Earl Marshal, a hereditary office always held by the Duke of Norfolk.

== History ==
=== Foundation ===
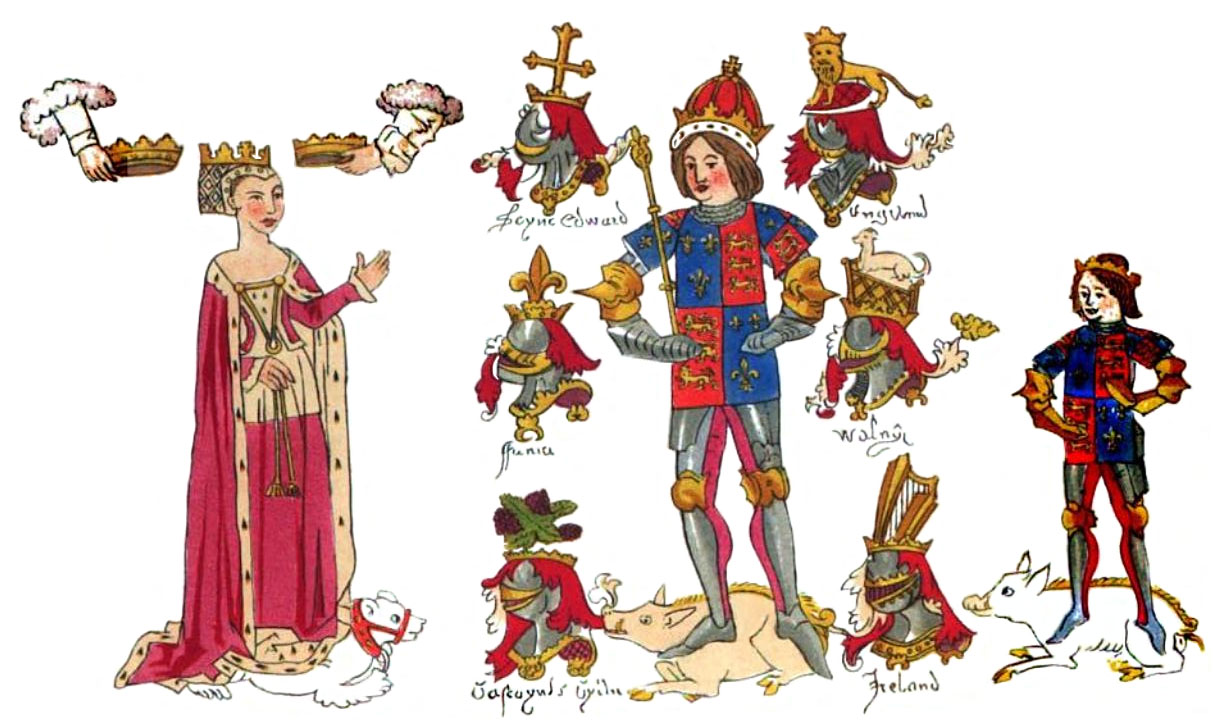
Depiction of King Richard III, the College of Arms' founder, his wife Queen Anne Neville, and their son Edward of Middleham, Prince of Wales, with their heraldic crests and badges from the Rous Roll. A roll of arms painted by John Rous around 1483–1485 for the Earl of Warwick.

King Richard III's interest in heraldry was indicated by his possession of two important rolls of arms. While still Duke of Gloucester and Constable of England for his brother (Edward IV) from 1469, he in the latter capacity supervised the heralds and made plans for the reform of their organisation. Soon after his accession to the throne he created Sir John Howard as Duke of Norfolk and Earl Marshal of England, who became the first Howard appointed to both positions.

In the first year of his reign, the royal heralds were incorporated under royal charter dated 2 March 1484, under the Latin name "Le Garter regis armorum Anglicorum, regis armorum partium Australium, regis armorum partium Borealium, regis armorum Wallæ et heraldorum, prosecutorum, sive pursevandorum armorum." Translated as: "the Garter King of Arms of England, the King of Arms of the Southern parts, the King of Arms of the Northern parts, the King of Arms of Wales, and all other heralds and pursuivants of arms". The charter then goes on to state that the heralds "for the time being, shall be in perpetuity a body corporate in fact and name, and shall preserve a succession unbroken." This charter titled "Literæ de incorporatione heraldorum" is now held in the British Museum. There has been some evidence that prior to this charter, the royal heralds had already in some ways behaved like a corporation as early as 1420. Nevertheless, the charter is the earliest surviving document to affirm the chapter as a corporate body of heralds. The charter outlines the constitution of the officers, their hierarchy, the privileges conferred upon them and their jurisdiction over all heraldic matters in the Kingdom of England.

The King empowered the College to have and use only one common seal of authority, and also instructed them to find a chaplain to celebrate mass daily for himself, Anne Neville, the Queen Consort, and his heir, Prince Edward. The College was also granted a house named Coldharbour (formerly Poulteney's Inn) on Upper Thames Street in the parish of All-Hallows-the-Less, for storing records and living space for the heralds. The house, built by Sir John de Pulteney, four times Lord Mayor of London, was said to be one of the greatest in the City of London.

=== Varying fortunes ===
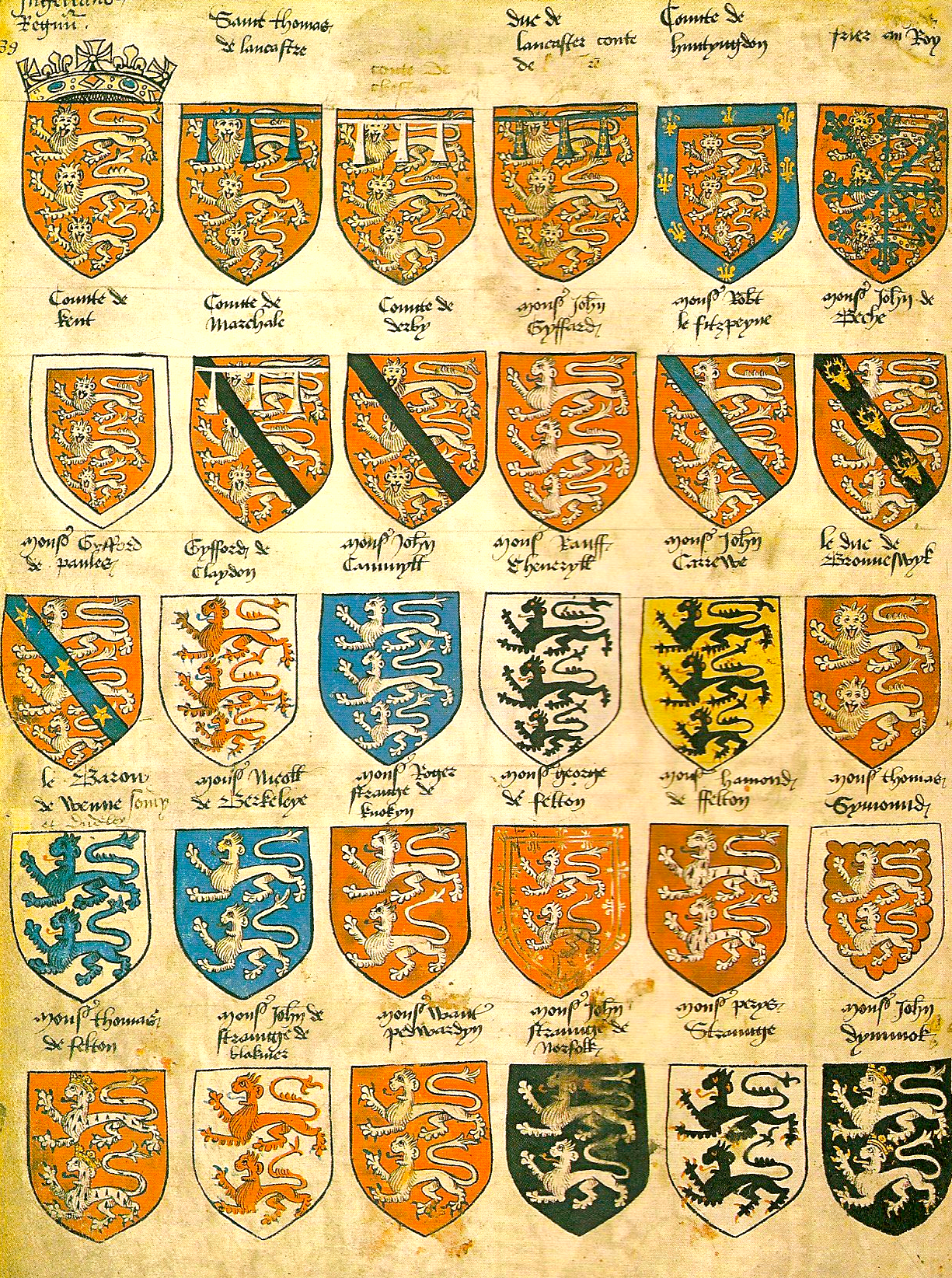
Prince Arthur's Book, an armorial of arms for Arthur, Prince of Wales, c. 1520, depicting the proliferation of lions in English heraldry

The defeat and death of Richard III at Bosworth field was a double blow for the heralds, for they lost both their patron, the King, and their benefactor, the Earl Marshal, who was also slain. The victorious Henry Tudor was crowned King Henry VII soon after the battle. Henry's first Parliament of 1485 passed an Act of Resumption, in which large grants of crown properties made by his two predecessors to their supporters were cancelled. Whether this act affected the status of the College's charter is debatable; however, the act did facilitate the de facto recovery of Coldharbour to the crown. Henry then granted the house to his mother Lady Margaret Beaufort, for life. This was because it was supposed that the house was granted personally to John Writhe the Garter King of Arms and not to the heralds as a corporation. As a result, the heralds were left destitute and many of their books and records were lost. Despite this ill treatment from the King, the heralds' position at the royal court remained, and they were compelled by the King to attend him at all times (albeit in rotation).

Of the reign of King Henry VIII, it has been said that: "at no time since its establishment, was [the college] in higher estimation, nor in fuller employment, than in this reign." Henry VIII was fond of pomp and magnificence, and thus gave the heralds plenty of opportunity to exercise their roles in his court. In addition, the members of the College were also expected to be regularly despatched to foreign courts on missions, whether to declare war, accompany armies, summon garrisons or deliver messages to foreign potentates and generals. During his magnificent meeting with Francis I of France at the Field of the Cloth of Gold in 1520, Henry VIII brought with him eighteen officers of arms, probably all he had, to regulate the many tournaments and ceremonies held there.

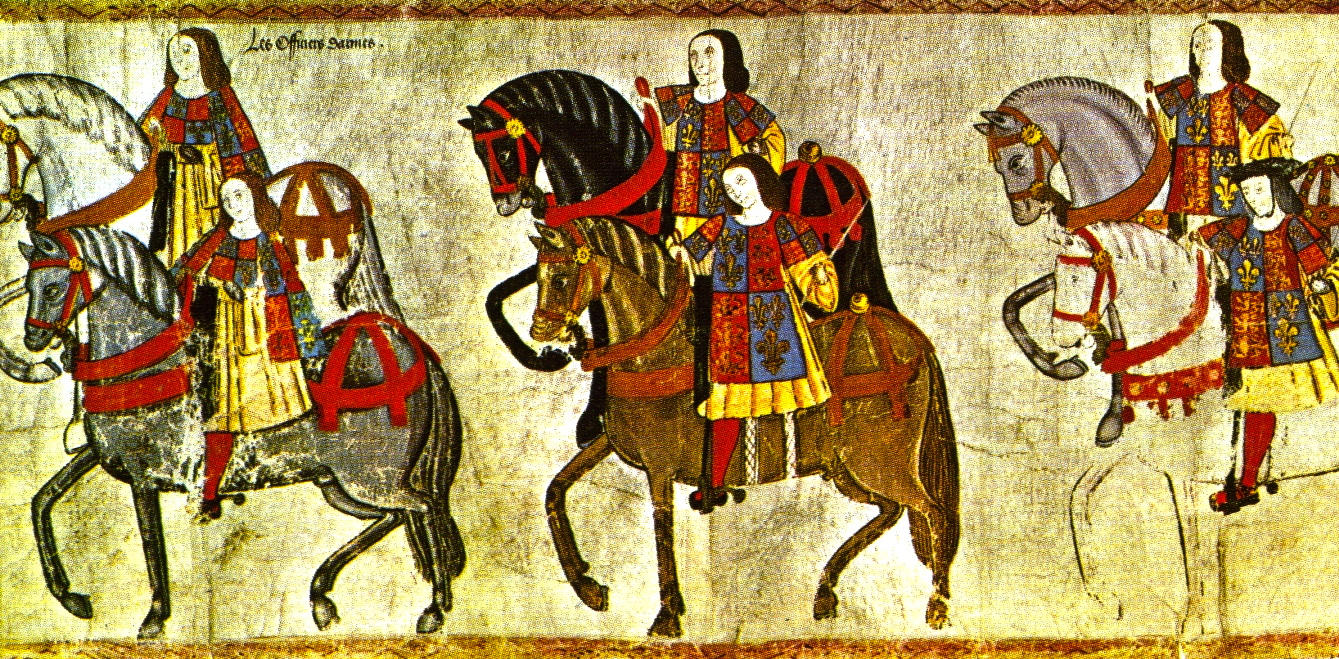
Officers of the College of Arms riding in procession to the Westminster Tournament, from a tourney roll, made during the reign of King Henry VIII in 1511. The pursuivants to the left are identified by their reversed tabards, while the figure in the right (with the black hat) is probably Garter King of Arms Sir Thomas Wriothesley.

Nevertheless, the College's petitions to the King and to the Duke of Suffolk in 1524 and 1533 for the return of their chapter house were rejected, and the heralds were left to hold chapter in whichever palace the royal court happened to be at the time. They even resorted to meeting at each other's houses, at various guildhalls and even a hospital. Furthermore, Henry VIII's habit of raising ladies in the situation of subjects to queens, and then awarding them many heraldic augmentations, which also extended to their respective families, was considered harmful to the science of heraldry. The noted antiquarian and heraldist Charles Boutell commented in 1863, that the: "Arms of Queen Anne Boleyn are the first which exemplify the usage, introduced by Henry VIII, of granting to his Consorts 'Augmentations' to their paternal arms. It is a striking illustration of the degenerate condition of Heraldry under the second Tudor Sovereign."

It was also in this reign in 1530, that Henry VIII conferred on the College one of its most important duties for almost a century, the heraldic visitation. The provincial Kings of Arms were commissioned under a royal warrant to enter all houses and churches and given authority to deface and destroy all arms unlawfully used by any knight, esquire, or gentleman. Around the time of the dissolution of the monasteries this duty became even more necessary as the monasteries were previously repositories of local genealogical records. From then on, all genealogical records and the duty of recording them was subsumed by the College. These visitations were serious affairs, and many individuals were charged and heavily fined for breaking the law of arms. Hundreds of these visitations were carried out well into the 17th century; the last was in 1686.

=== Reincorporation ===
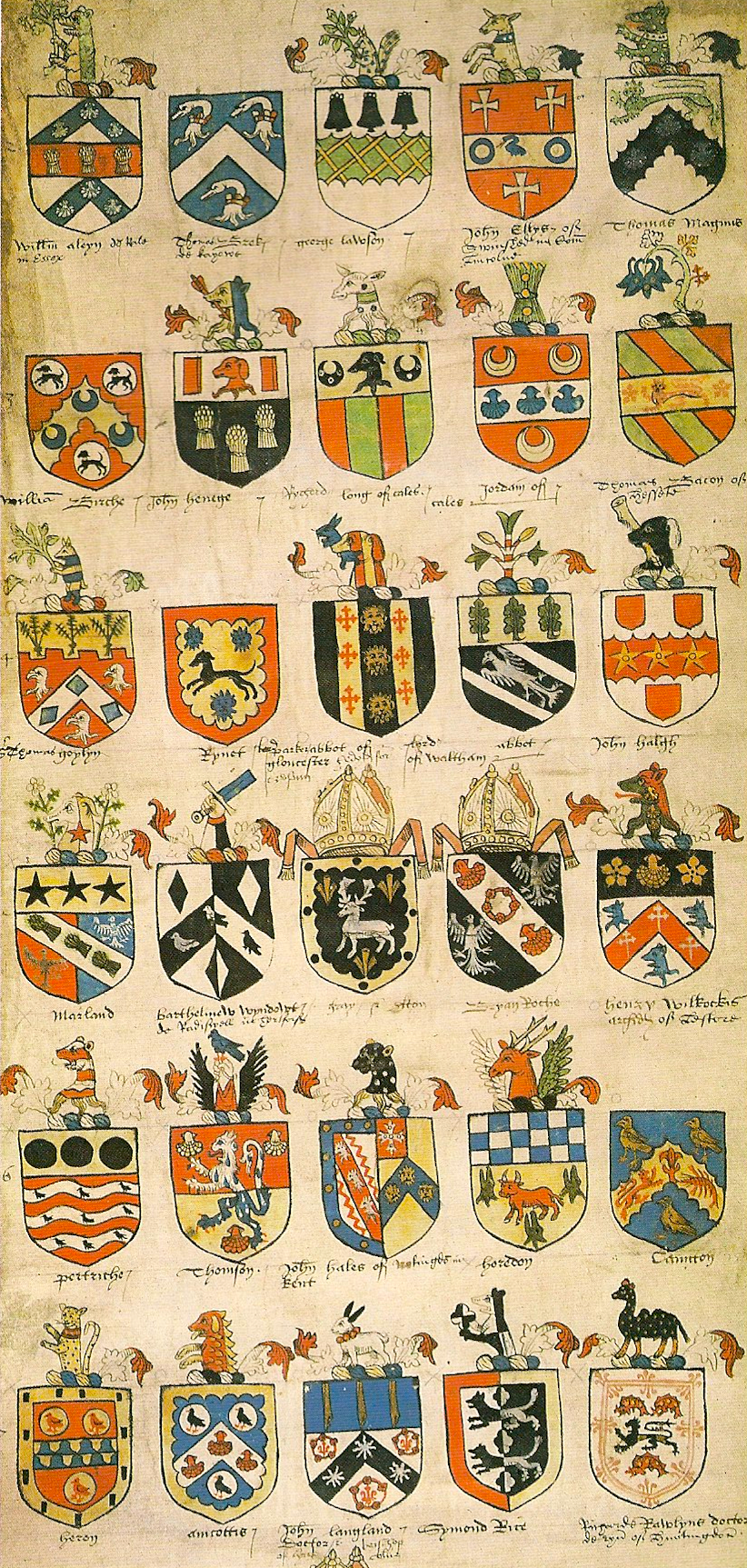
Roll of grants of arms during the Tudor period by Sir Thomas Wriothesley, c 1528

The College found a patroness in Mary I, although it must have been embarrassing for both sides, after the heralds initially proclaimed the right of her rival Lady Jane Grey to the throne. When King Edward VI died on 6 July 1553, Lady Jane Grey was proclaimed queen four days later, first in Cheapside then in Fleet Street by two heralds, trumpets blowing before them. However, when popular support swung to Mary's side, the Lord Mayor of London and his councils accompanied by the Garter King of Arms, two other heralds, and four trumpeters returned to Cheapside to proclaim Mary's ascension as rightful queen instead. The College's excuse was that they had been compelled in their earlier act by the Duke of Northumberland (Lady Jane's father-in-law, who was later executed), an excuse that Mary accepted.

The queen and her husband (and co-sovereign) Philip II of Spain then set about granting the College a new house called Derby Place or Derby House, under a new charter, dated 18 July 1555 at Hampton Court Palace. The house was built by Thomas Stanley, 1st Earl of Derby, who married Lady Margaret Beaufort in 1482 and was created the 1st Earl of Derby in 1485. The house was built in 1503 and was given to the Crown by the 3rd Earl in 1552/3 in exchange for some land. The charter stated that the house would: "enable them [the College] to assemble together, and consult, and agree amongst themselves, for the good of their faculty, and that the records and rolls might be more safely and conveniently deposited." The charter also reincorporated the three kings of arms, six heralds and all other heralds and pursuivants, and their successors, into a corporation with perpetual succession. A new seal of authority, with the College's full coat of arms was also engraved. On 16 May 1565, the name "the House of the Office of Arms" was used, thereafter in May 1566 "our Colledge of Armes", and in January 1567 "our House of the College of the office of arms".

Derby Place was situated in the parish of St Benedict and St Peter, south of St Paul's Cathedral, more or less on the College's present location. There are records of the heralds carrying out modifications to the structure of Derby Place over many years. However, little record of its appearance has survived, except the description that the buildings formed three sides of a quadrangle, entered through a gate with a portcullis on the west side. On the south range, roughly where Queen Victoria Street now stands, was a large hall on the western end. Derby Place's hearth tax bill from 1663, discovered in 2009 at the National Archives at Kew, showed that the building had about thirty-two rooms, which were the workplace as well as the home to eleven officers of arms.

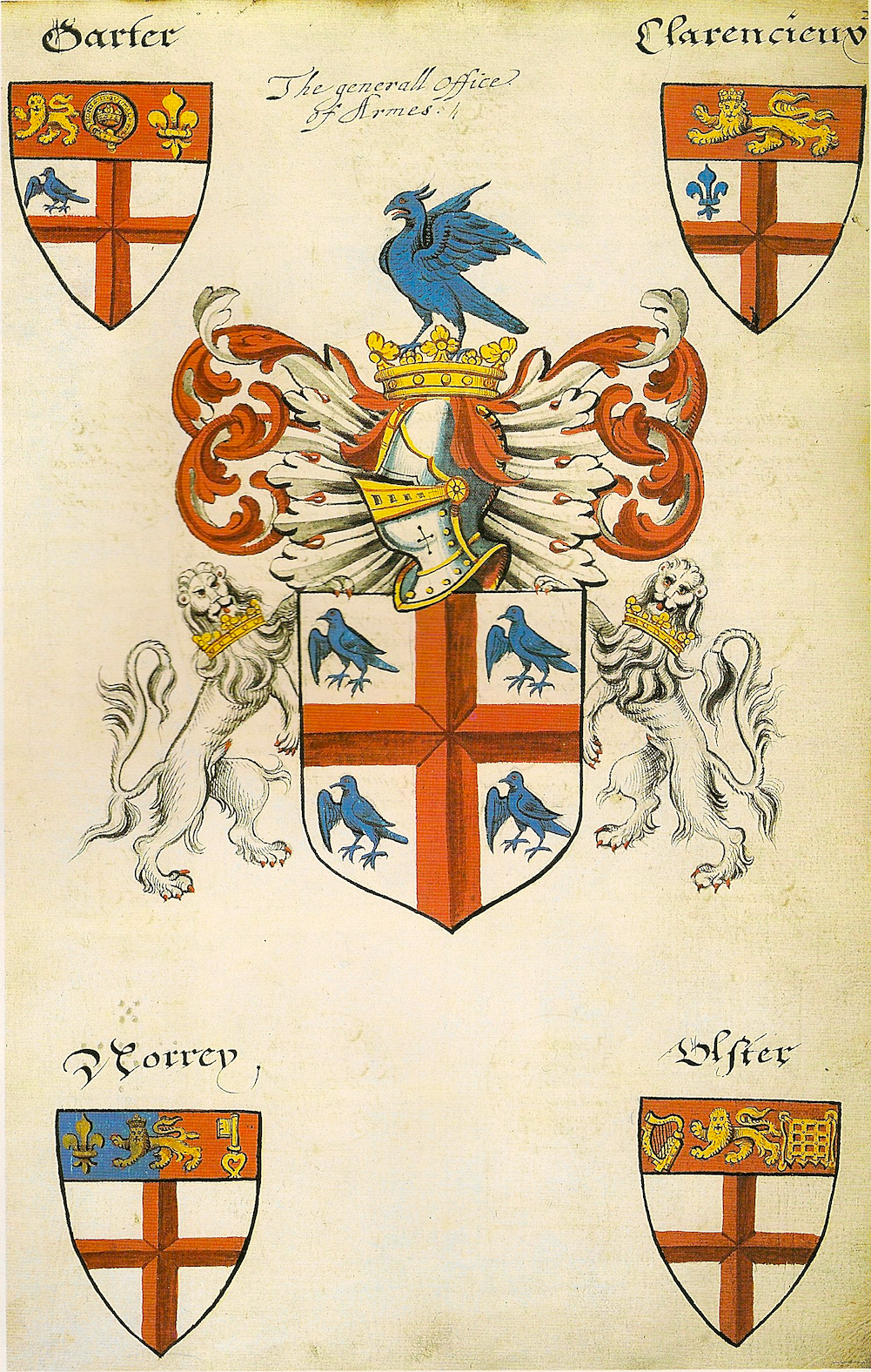
Armorial achievement of the College and its Kings of Arms, from Lant's Roll painted by Thomas Lant around 1595. It depicts the arms of Garter, Clarenceux, Norroy and Ulster. The additional charge in the first quarter of the first two shields, does not appear subsequently.

The reign of Mary's sister Elizabeth I saw the college's privileges confirmed by an act of Parliament in 1566. As well as the drawing up of many important internal statutes and ordinances for the College by Thomas Howard, Duke of Norfolk, the Earl Marshal, dated 18 July 1568. The long reign saw the College distracted by the many quarrels between Garter William Dethick, Clarenceux Robert Cooke and York Herald Ralph Brooke about their rights and annulments. Disputes in which the other officers also took part, often occurred among the lesser heralds against each other. Historian Mark Noble wrote in 1805, that these fights often involved the use of "every epithet that was disgraceful to themselves and their opponents." and that "Their accusations against each other would fill a volume." During these years, the College's reputation was greatly injured in the eyes of the public.

The reason behind these discords were laid on the imperfect execution of the reorganisation of the College in 1568 and the uncertainty over issue of granting arms to the new and emerging gentry of the era. An enquiry into the state of the College lasted for one year, finally reporting to William Cecil, 1st Baron Burghley in 1596; as a consequence, many important measures of reform for the College were made in the reign of James I. Eventually, these animosities among the heralds in the College ended only after the expulsion of one and the death of another.

=== Civil War ===
When the English Civil War began in 1642 during the reign of King Charles I, the College was divided: three kings of arms, three heralds and one pursuivant sided with the King and the Royalists, while the other officers began to court the services of the Parliamentarian side. Nevertheless, the heralds petitioned Parliament in the same year, to protect their: "Books of Record, Registers, Entries, Precedents, Arms, Pedigrees and Dignities." In 1643 the heralds joined the King at Oxford, and were with him at Naseby and followed him on all of his campaigns. Sir Edward Walker the Garter King of Arms (from 1645) was even appointed, with the permission of Parliament, to act as the King's chief secretary at the negotiations at Newport. After the execution of Charles I, Walker joined Charles II in his exile in the Netherlands.

Meanwhile, on 3 August 1646 the Committee of Sequestration took possession of the College premises, and kept it under its own authority. Later in October, Parliament ordered the committee to directly remove those officers whose loyalties were with the King and to nominate their own candidates to fill these vacant offices. Those officers whose loyalty remained with the King were persecuted; first they were deprived of their offices, then of their emoluments, then a fine was imposed and some were even imprisoned. In spite of this, the institutional College was protected by the Parliamentarians, and their rights and work continued unabated. Edward Bysshe a Member of Parliament from Bletchingley was appointed Garter, thus "Parliament which rejected its King created for itself a King of Arms". During this time the heralds continued their work and were even present on 26 June 1657 at Oliver Cromwell's second installation ceremony as Lord Protector of the Commonwealth.

=== Survival ===
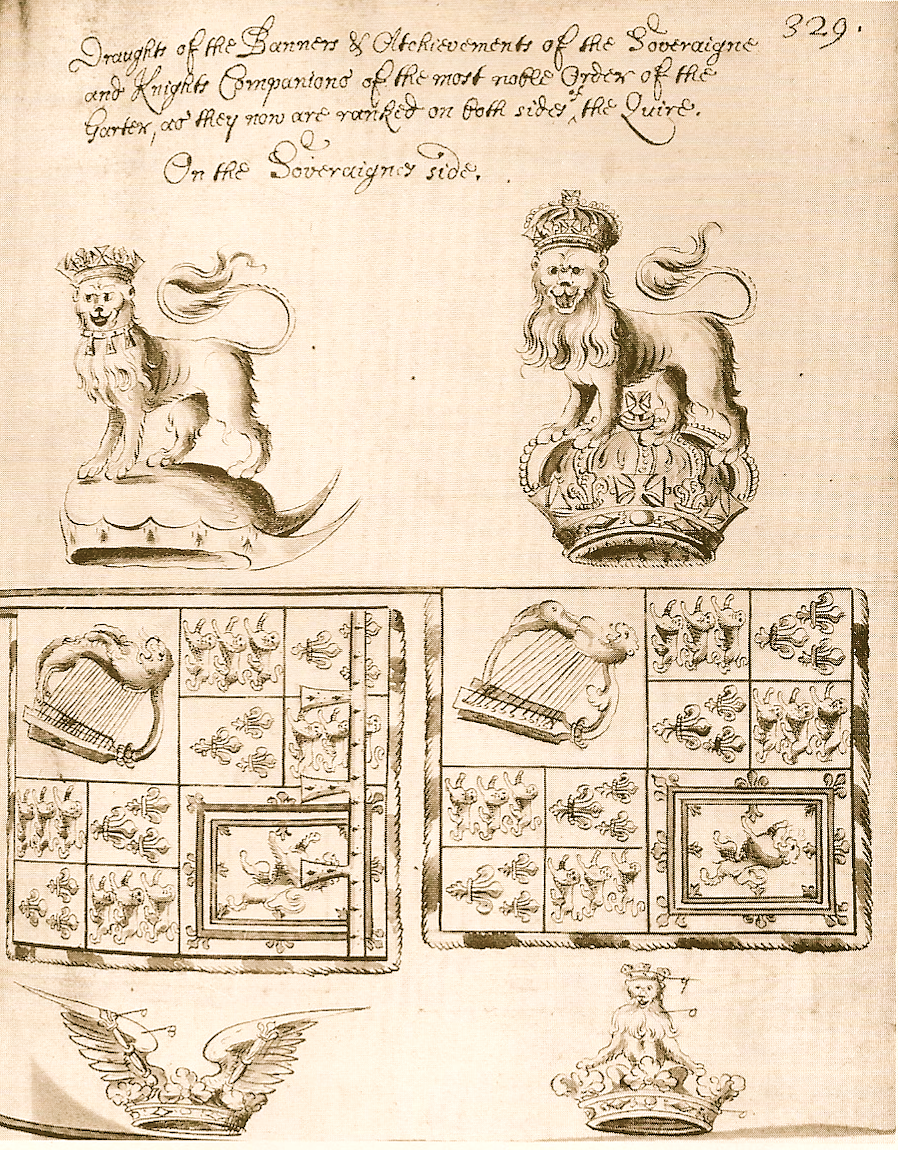
Heraldic banners and crests of King Charles II and his brother James, Duke of York (later James II), observed by Elias Ashmole, Windsor Herald. On a visitation to Berkshire in 1664–1665, the banners and crests were found at the choir stalls of St. George's Chapel, Windsor Castle.

On 8 May 1660, the heralds at the command of the Convention Parliament proclaimed Charles II, King at Westminster Hall Gate. It was said that William Ryley, who was originally appointed Lancaster Herald by Charles I but then sided with Cromwell, did not even have a tabard with the Royal Arms, as his own had been "plundered in the wars". He had to borrow a decorative one from the tomb of James I in Westminster Abbey instead; the garment was duly returned the next day. The Restoration of Charles II annulled all the Acts of the Parliament and all the actions of the Lord Protector, without penalising any of their supporters (except for the regicides). Accordingly, all the grant of arms of the Commonwealth College was declared null and void. Furthermore, all heralds appointed during the Interregnum lost their offices, while those appointed originally by Charles I returned to their places. The exception was Edward Bysshe, who was removed as Garter, but was instead appointed Clarenceux in 1661, much to the chagrin of Garter Edward Walker.

In 1666 as the Great Fire of London swept through the city, Derby Place, the College's home since 1555, was completely gutted and destroyed. The College's library was, however, saved: it was initially stored in the Palace of Whitehall and was subsequently moved to the Palace of Westminster, where a temporary office was opened in an apartment called the Queen's court. An announcement was also made in the London Gazette to draw public notice to the situation. Due to a shortage of funds, the planned rebuilding of a new College was delayed until 1670. It was then that Francis Sandford, the Rouge Dragon Pursuivant and Morris Emmett, the King's bricklayer, were together able to design and begin construction of a new structure on the old site. The costs of the rebuilding was financed in stages, and the structure was erected slowly in parts. The heralds contributed significantly out of their own pockets; at the same time, they also sought subscriptions among the nobility, with the names of contributors recorded into a series of splendid manuscripts known as the Benefactors Books.

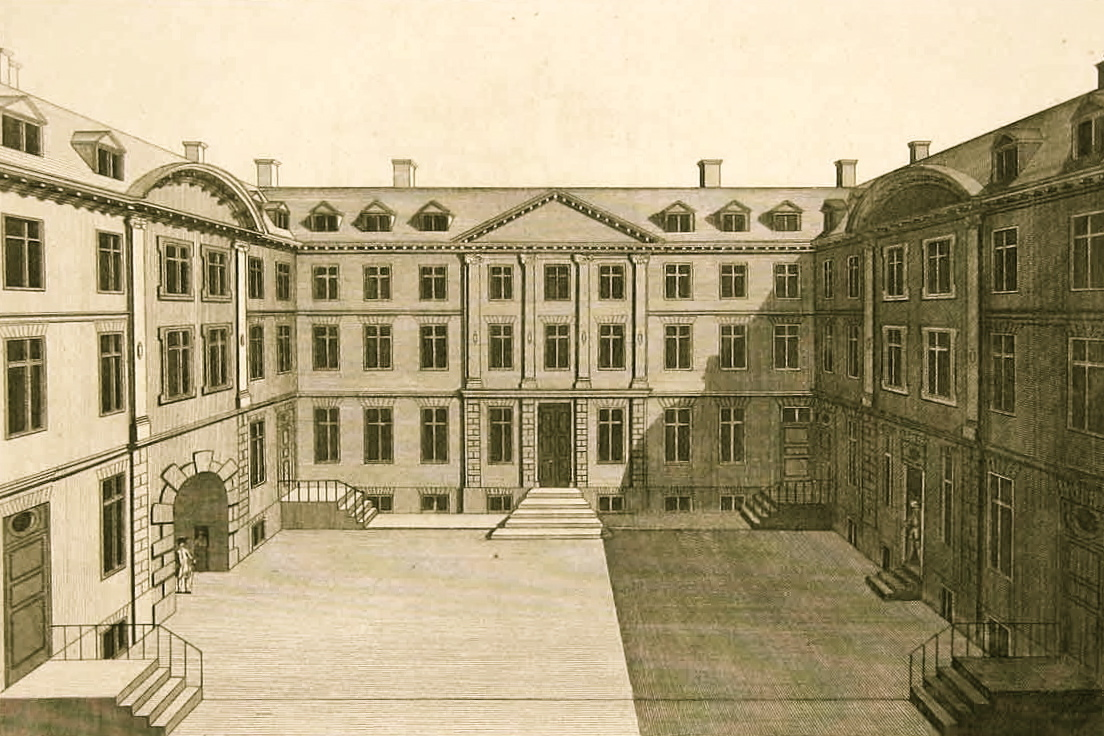
The College of Arms as it looked in the 18th century, engraved by Benjamin Cole, and published in William Maitland's The History and Survey of London From Its Evolution to the Present Time in 1756.

By 1683 the College part of the structure was finished. The new building was built out of plain bricks of three storeys, with basement and attic levels in addition. The College consists of an extensive range of quadrangular buildings. Apart from the hall, a porter's lodge and a public office, the rest of the building was given over to the heralds as accommodation. To the east and south sides three terraced houses were constructed for leases, their façade in keeping with the original design. In 1699 the hall, which for some time had been used as a library, was transformed into the Earl Marshal's Court or the Court of Chivalry; it remains so to this day. In 1776 some stylistic changes were made to the exterior of the building and some details, such as pediments and cornices were removed, transforming the building to the then popular but austere Neo-Classical style.

The magnificent coronation of James II in 1685 saw the College revived as an institution of state and the monarchy. However, the abrupt end of his reign saw all but one of the heralds taking the side of William of Orange and Mary II in the Glorious Revolution. The period from 1704 to 1706 saw not a single grant of arms being made by the College; this nadir was attributed to the changes in attitude of the times. The Acts of Union 1707 between England and Scotland, in the reign of Anne did not affect the jurisdiction or the rights of the College. The College of Arms and the Court of the Lord Lyon were to exist side by side in their respective realms. However, in the matter of precedence; the Lord Lyon, when in England, was to take immediate precedence behind Garter King of Arms.

=== Comfortable decay ===
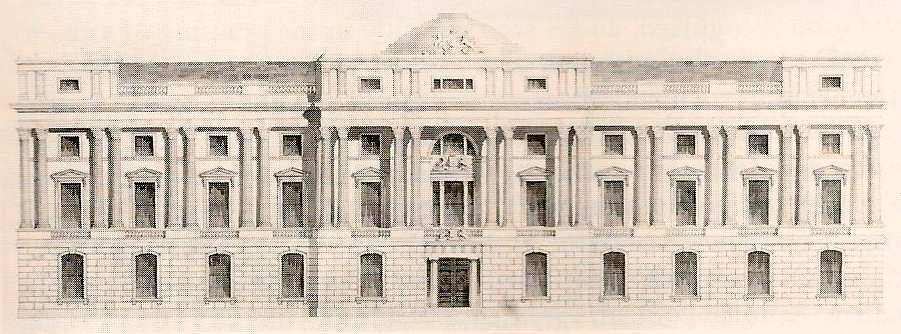
Design by Robert Abraham (1773–1850) for a new College of Arms in Trafalgar Square, at the heart of Regency London in the 1820s; the plan was not executed due to a lack of funds.

The Hanoverian succession to the throne of Great Britain led to reigns with less ceremony than in any since the incorporation of the heralds. The only notable incident for the college in this period, during the reign of George I, happened in 1727 when an impostor called Robert Harman pretended to be a herald. The knave was prosecuted by the College in the county of Suffolk, and was sentenced to be pilloried in several market towns on public market days and afterwards to be imprisoned and pay a fine. This hefty sentence was executed, proving that the rights of the College were still respected. In 1737, during the reign of George II the College petitioned for another charter, to reaffirm their rights and remuneration; this effort proved unsuccessful. Apart from these events the influence of the College was greatly diminished.

In 1742 a sugar house was built against the wall of the College. This structure was a fire risk and the cause of great anxiety among the heralds. In 1775 the College Surveyor drew attention to this problem, but to no avail. In February 1800, the College was asked by a Select Committee of the House of Commons to report to them the state of public records; again the heralds drew attention to the proximity of the sugar house. Members of the committee inspected the College premises and reported to the House that the College must either be moved to a new building or secured against the risk of fire. Again nothing was done; in 1812 water seeped through the walls of the College damaging records. The Surveyor traced the leak back to a shed recently erected by Alderman Smith, owner of the sugar house, who declared his readiness to do everything he could, but who actually did very little to rectify the situation. After years of negotiation the College, in 1820, bought the sugar house from Smith for the sum of £1,500.

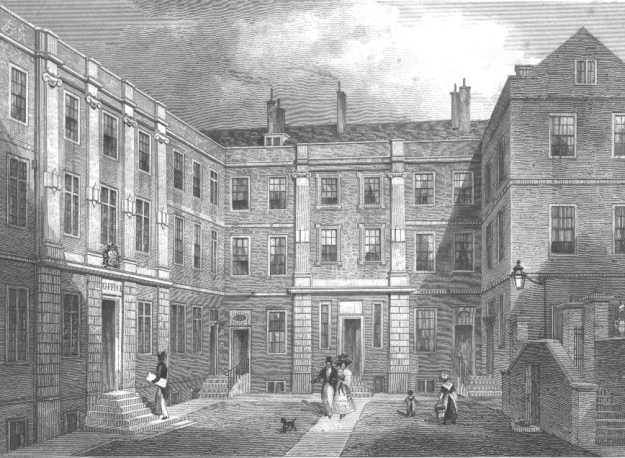
Herald's College, Bennet's Hill. Drawn by Thomas H. Shepherd, engraved by W. Wallis. Jones & Co. Temple of the Muses, Finsbury Square, London, 17 April 1830

Great financial strains placed upon the College during these times were relieved when the extravagant Prince Regent (the future George IV) granted to the College an annual endowment by Royal Warrant on 29 February 1820. This generous endowment from the crown, the first since 1555, was applied towards the reparation and support of the College. Despite the successes of the purchase of the sugar house and the royal endowment, the College still looked upon the possibility of moving its location to a more suitable and fashionable place. John Nash was at the same time laying out his plans for a new London, and, in 1822, the College, through the Deputy Earl Marshal, asked the government for a portion of land in the new districts on which to build a house to keep their records. A petition from the College was given to the Lords of the Treasury setting out the herald's reason for the move: "that the local situation of the College is so widely detached from the proper scene of the official duties and occupations of Your Memorialists and from the residences of that class of persons by whom the records in their charge are chiefly and most frequently consulted."

Nash himself was asked by the College to design a new building near fashionable Trafalgar Square but Nash's elaborate plan proved too costly and ambitious for the College. At the same time the College also asked Robert Abraham to submit to them a second plan for the building. When Nash heard that another architect was approached behind his back he reacted vehemently, and attacked the heralds. The College nevertheless continued with their plans. However, they were constantly beset by conflicts between the different officers over the amount needed to build a new building. By 1827 the college still had no coherent plan; the Duke of Norfolk ordered the College to drop the matter altogether. By 1842 the heralds were reconciled with their location and once again commissioned Abraham to build a new octagonal-shaped Record Room on the site of the old sugar house.

In 1861 a proposal was made to construct a road from Blackfriars to the Mansion House; this would have resulted in the complete demolition of the College. However, protests from the heralds resulted in only parts of the south east and south west wings being sliced off, requiring extensive remodelling. The College was now a three-sided building with an open courtyard facing the New Queen Victoria Street laid out in 1866. The terrace, steps and entrance porch were also added around this time.

=== Reform ===
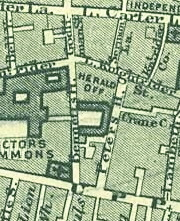
1862 map showing layout of the College (labelled Herald Off.). Carter Lane and Upper Thames Street can be seen running parallel to the north and south of the College, respectively. St Benet's, Paul's Wharf, the official church of the College since 1555, can be seen to the south west.

On 18 October 1869, a warrant for a commission of inquiry into the state of the college was established. The warrant, issued on the behalf of the Duke of Norfolk, stated "that it is desirable that the College of Arms should be visited, and an inquiry instituted with the view of ascertaining whether the Rules and Orders for the good government of the said College ... are duly obeyed and fulfilled ... and whether by change of circumstances or any other cause, any new Laws, Ordinances or Regulations are necessary to be made ... for the said College." The commission had three members: Lord Edward Fitzalan-Howard (the Deputy Earl Marshal), Sir William Alexander (a Queen's Counsel) and Edward Bellasis (a Serjeant-at-Law). Sir Bernard Burke (of the famous Burke's Peerage), at the time Ulster King of Arms, gave the commission the advice that the college should "be made a Government Department, let its Officers receive fixed salaries from Government, and let all its fees be paid into the public exchequer. This arrangement would, I am sure, be self-supporting and would raise at once the character of the Office and the status of the Heralds." Burke's suggestion for reform was the same arrangement that had already been applied to the Lord Lyon Court in Scotland by the Lyon King of Arms Act 1867, and was to be applied to his own office in 1871. However, unlike the Lyon Court, which was a court of law and part of the Scottish Judiciary, the College of Arms has always been an independent corporate body overseen by the Earl Marshal. While the Lord Lyon depended on the government for its reforms and statutes, the college has always been able to carry out changes from within itself. The commission also drew attention to the fees, annulments and library of the college, as well as the general modernisation of the chapter as a whole. When the commission made its report in 1870, it recommended many changes, and these were duly made in another warrant dated 27 April 1871. Burke's recommendation, however, was not implemented.

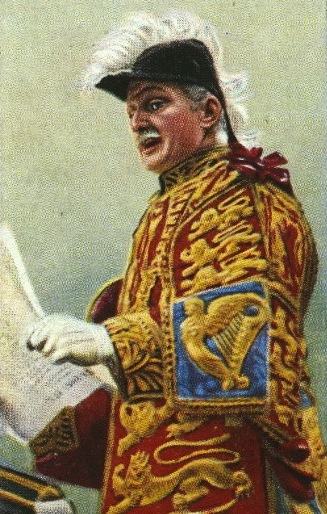
Sir Algar Howard, KCB, KCVO, MC, TD, was appointed Norroy King of Arms in 1931. In 1943 he became the first Norroy and Ulster King of Arms, when the two titles were merged. He served in this office until 1944 when he was promoted to Garter King of Arms; he retired in 1950.

Despite the findings of this inquiry, the issues surrounding the status and position of the college continued. At the beginning of the 20th century these issues were once again brought to the forefront. In 1903 an inquiry was set up at the instructions of Arthur Balfour, soon to be Prime Minister. The committee of inquiry was to consist of eight members; Sir Algernon West was made chairman. They were tasked to investigate "the constitution, duties and administration of the Heralds' College"; the main issues being the anomalous position of the college, who are theoretically officials of the royal household, but actually derive their income from fees paid by private individuals for their services. Some of the members of the committee (a minority) wanted (like Burke thirty-four years earlier) to make officers of the College of Arms into "salaried civil servants of the state". Despite concluding that some form of change was necessary, the inquiry categorically stated that any change "is at the present time and in present circumstances impracticable." In 1905 the generous endowment from the Crown (as instituted by George IV) was stopped by the Liberal Government of the day as part of its campaign against the House of Lords and the class system.

A second inquiry was established in 1928 under the chairmanship of Lord Birkenhead. The inquiry was called soon after a secret memorandum, written in 1927, was circulated by the Home Office, criticising the constitution and workings of the heralds. The memorandum states that "They have, as will be seen from this memorandum, in many cases attempted to interfere with the exercise by the Secretary of State of his constitutional responsibility for advising the Crown", and that the college had "adopted practices in connection with matters within their jurisdiction which seem highly improper in themselves, and calculated to bring the royal prerogative into contempt." These accusations concern the actions of certain heralds, who overzealously advocate the cases of their paid clients, even against the opposition of the ministers of the day. Sir Anthony Wagner writes that "The officers of these departments, no doubt, in the overconfident way of their generation, esteemed the College an anachronistic and anomalous institution overdue for reform or abolition." The memorandum ended by saying that "the College of Arms is a small and highly organised luxury trade, dependent for its living on supplying the demand for a fancy article among the well to do: and like many such trades it has in very many cases to create the demand before it can supply it."

When the committee made their report in June 1928 they suggested several reforms to tackle the main issues which had brought the college into so much conflict with the Home Office. Firstly they concluded that the fees systems were adequate and no change was necessary in that regard. They justified this by stating that "placing all or even a few of the Officers on a fixed salary outweigh any advantages which might be expected to result from the change." Secondly they concluded that from now on the college was to be entirely subordinated to the Home Office, and that a standing inter-departmental committee be established to settle any future conflicts.

=== Present ===
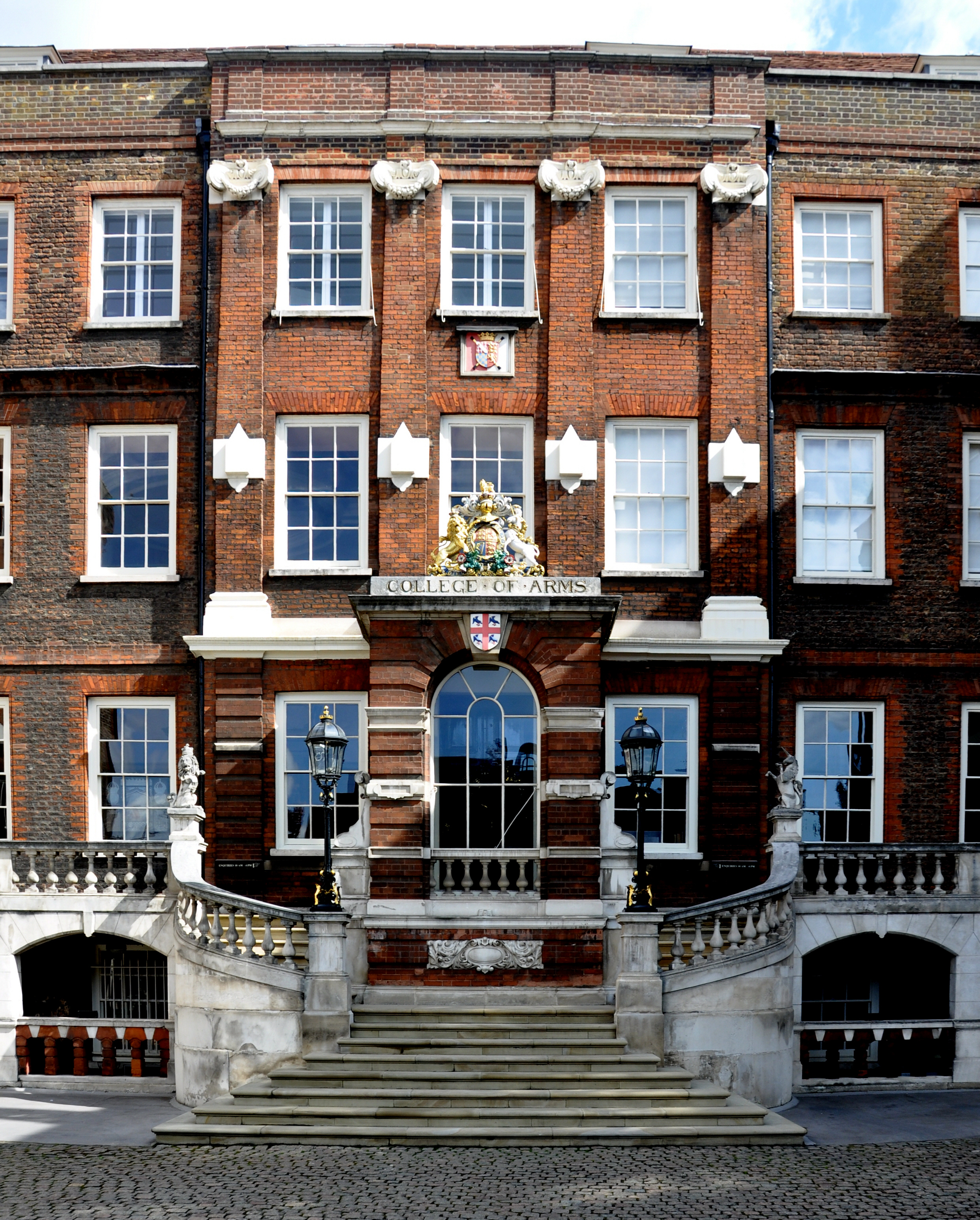
Main entrance to the College of Arms, 2011

In 1934, on the 450th anniversary of the incorporation of the College of Arms, an exhibition was held at the College of the heralds' principal treasures and other associated interests. The exhibition was opened by the Earl Marshal and ran from 28 June to 26 July, during which time it received more than 10,000 visitors, including the Duke (George VI) and Duchess of York (Elizabeth).

In 1939 at the beginning of the Second World War the College's records were moved to Thornbury Castle in Gloucestershire, the home of Major Algar Howard (the Norroy King of Arms). Meanwhile, on 10 and 11 May 1941 the College building was almost consumed by fire, which had already levelled all the buildings to the east of the College on Queen Victoria Street. The building was given up for lost, when a change in the wind saved it. At the end of the war, all of the records were returned safely to the College.

In 1943 the College was given new responsibilities when the office of Ulster King of Arms was annexed and combined with those of the Norroy King of Arms, creating a new office called Norroy and Ulster King of Arms; Sir Algar Howard thus became the first to hold this office.

Although the College building was saved from the war, its walls and roof were left in a perilous state. In 1954 a decision was forced upon heralds, whether to abandon the old building (which would have been profitable financially) or repair it on a scale far beyond the College's resources. Eventually with the help of the Ministry of Works and a public subscription, the building was repaired in time for the College's 4th centenary of being in possession of Derby Place. The present gates to the building were added in 1956, and came originally from Goodrich Court in Herefordshire. The new gates displayed the College's arms and crest.

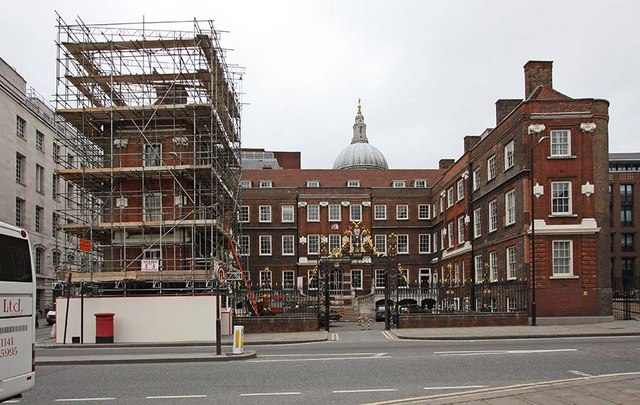
The College of Arms in March 2009, with scaffolding on the west wing of the building after the 2009 fire

In the year of the quincentenary of the incorporation of the College of Arms, the College held a special service of thanksgiving at St Benet's, Paul's Wharf (the College's official church since 1555) on 2 March 1984. The Kings of Arms, Heralds and Pursuivants, ordinary and extraordinary, of the College in full uniform processed from the College towards the church together with Queen Elizabeth II, the Duke of Norfolk, the Earl Marshal and the Earl of Arundel, the Deputy Earl Marshal.

On 5 February 2009 a fire broke out at the west wing on the third and fourth floor of the College building. Eight London Fire Brigade fire engines were able to bring the flames under control, in the meantime 35 people were evacuated from the building and a further 100 from adjacent buildings. No records or books of the College were damaged. Repairs to the smoke-damaged rooms and exterior brickwork were completed in December 2009.

== Roles ==
=== Ceremonial ===
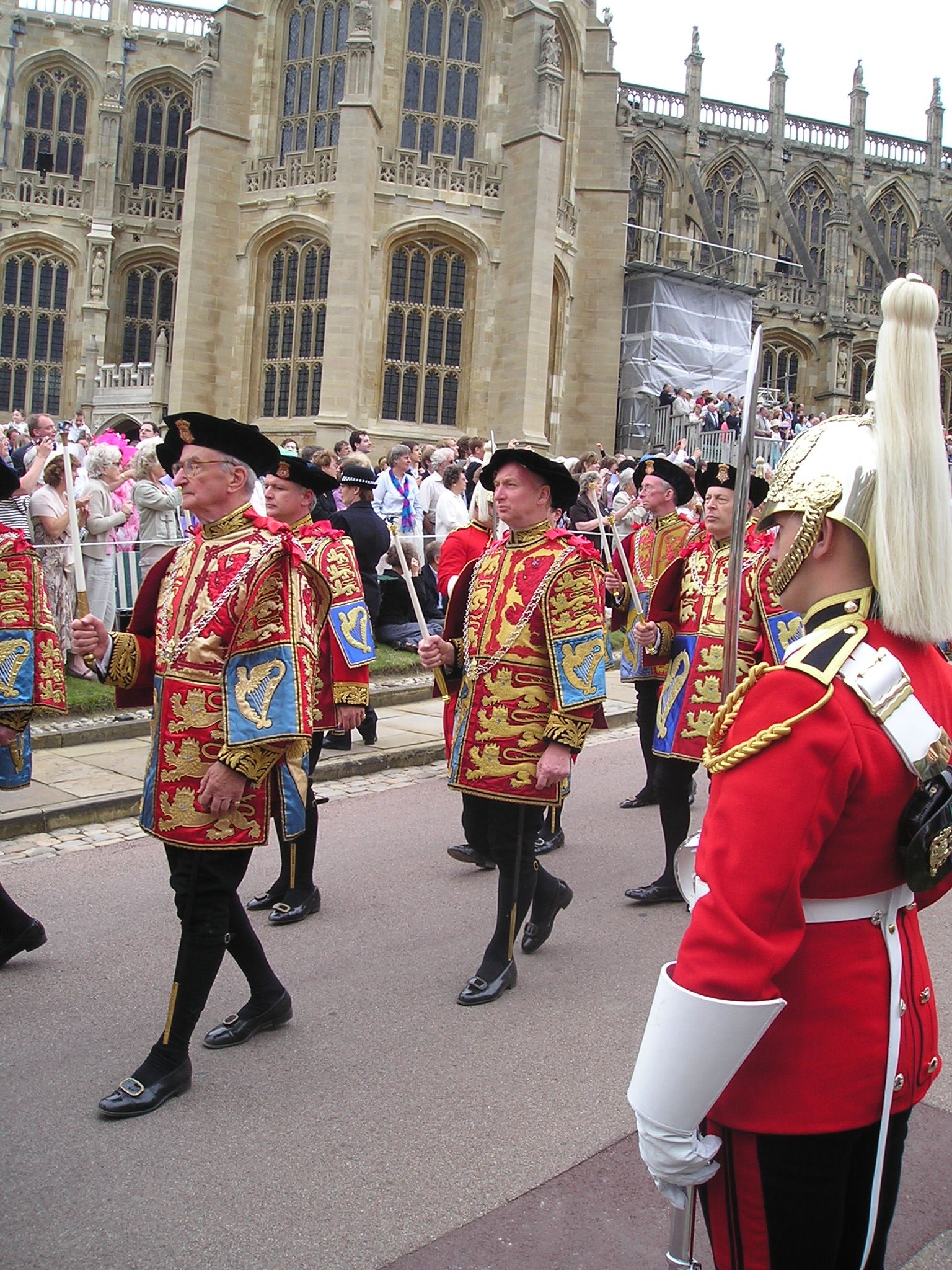
Heralds in procession to St George's Chapel, Windsor Castle (in the background), for the annual service of the Order of the Garter, 19 June 2006

The College of Arms is a part of the Royal Household of the Sovereign of the United Kingdom. As such they accompany the monarch on various state occasions. These occasions are centred around the institution of the monarchy as the symbol of the state, and the expression of majesty and power through public pomp and ceremony. Currently the heralds appear in their full uniforms only twice a year: at the State Opening of Parliament and at the Garter Service at Windsor Castle in June. The organisation and planning of all State ceremonies falls within the prerogative of the Earl Marshal, the College's chief. As a result, the heralds have a role to perform within every significant royal ceremony.

The (usually annual) State Opening of Parliament takes place at the Houses of Parliament. The heralds, including both ordinary and extraordinary officers, form the front part of the Royal Procession, preceding the Sovereign and other Great Officers of State. The procession starts at the bottom of the Victoria Tower, then proceeds up the Norman Porch to the Robing Chamber. Once the Sovereign has put on the Imperial State Crown, the heralds lead the monarch once again through the Royal Gallery into the House of Lords, remain with the monarch during the speech and accompany the monarch to the bounds of the Palace.

Garter Service or Garter Day is held in St George's Chapel, Windsor Castle every June on the Monday of Royal Ascot week. On this occasion, new Companions of the Order of the Garter are personally invested with their insignia in the Throne Room of Windsor Castle by the Sovereign. All the members then have lunch in the Waterloo Chamber, wearing their blue velvet robes and black velvet hats with white plumes. Afterwards the members walk from the Upper Ward of the castle towards St George's Chapel. During their procession they are led by members of the College of Arms in their tabards, the Military Knights of Windsor and contingents of the Sovereign's Bodyguard. After the service, the members return to the Upper Ward by carriage. This ceremony is especially significant for the Garter King of Arms, the senior officer of the College, who is an officer of the Order.

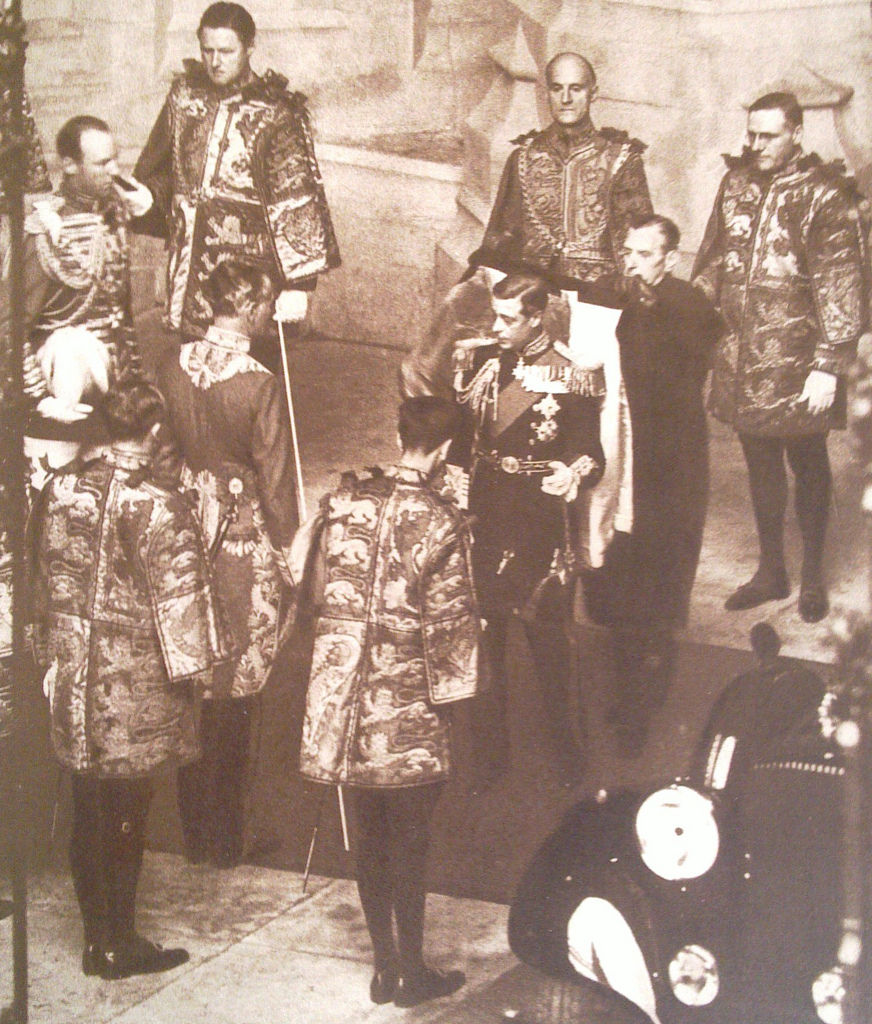
King Edward VIII surrounded by heralds of the College of Arms prior to his only State Opening of Parliament on 3 November 1936

Participation in these two annual ceremonies is considered the least time-consuming part of the herald's roles. However, at other times, they are involved in some of the most important ceremonies concerning the life of the British monarch. After the death of a Sovereign the Accession Council (made up of Privy Counsellors and other officers such as the Lord Mayor of London) meets at St. James's Palace to make a formal proclamation of the accession of the next Sovereign. Traditionally, this proclamation is made by being physically read out. This task is assigned to the various members of the College by way of the Earl Marshal, who receives the text of the proclamation in person from the council. The proclamation is to be read at several locations in London. Traditionally the first reading is made from the Friary Court balcony at St James's Palace. Another reading and ceremony is held at Temple Bar. There a detachment of heralds, accompanied by troops of the Royal Horse Guards, formally demand admission to the precinct of the City of London from the City Marshall and City Remembrancer. The barrier, consisting of a silken rope (in place of the ancient bar), is then removed and the detachment marches forward to meet the Lord Mayor and City Sheriffs, where the proclamation would be read. There are also other readings by members of the College at the corner of Chancery Lane, in Fleet Street, and at the Royal Exchange.

During the Coronation Ceremony, members of the College form part of the Royal procession as it enters Westminster Abbey. The members of the College walk in the procession in virtue of them being His Majesty's "Kings, Heralds and Pursuivants of Arms of England." They do so alongside their Scottish colleagues: the Lord Lyon, the Heralds and Pursuivants of Arms of the Lyon Court. The Garter King of Arms is usually placed next to the Lord Great Chamberlain in the procession; he has the duty of guiding, but not performing, the ceremony. Garter's duties during the coronation ceremony are therefore not unlike those of a Master of Ceremonies. It is only during this ceremony that the Kings of Arms are allowed to wear their distinctive crowns, the only group of individuals, apart from the King and Queen, authorised to do so.

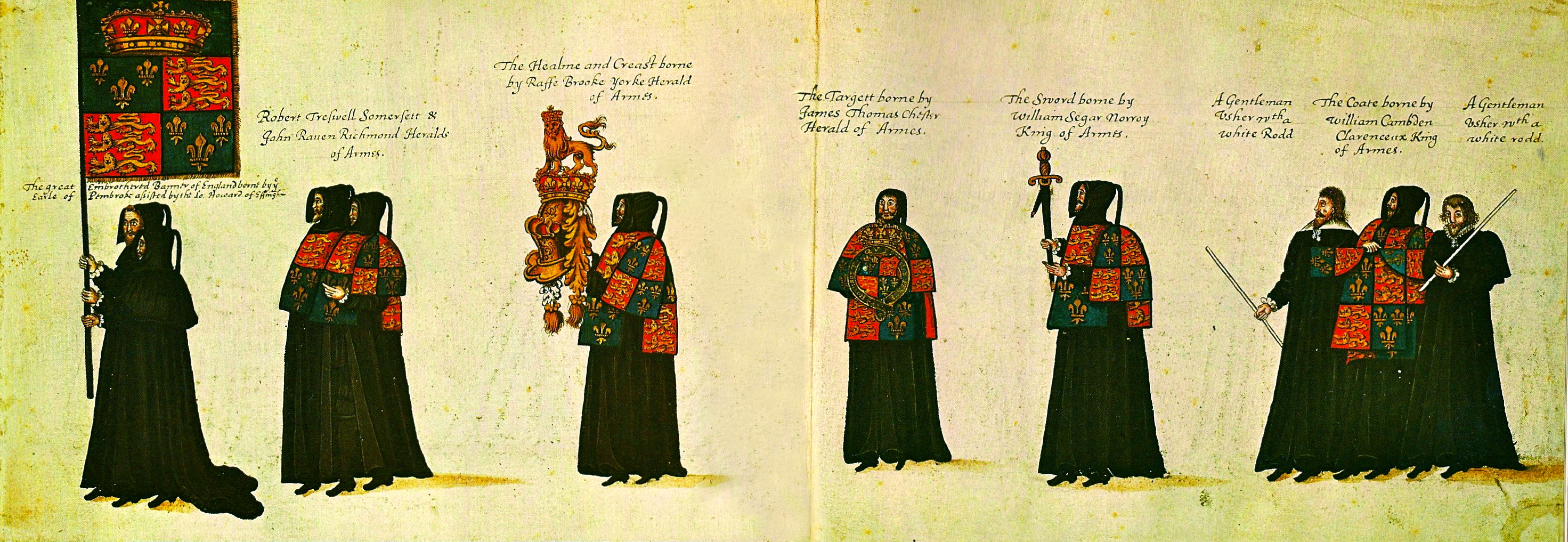
The heraldic funeral procession of Queen Elizabeth I of England in 1603, depicting some the heralds of the College of Arms, each carrying a piece of the Sovereign's armour

At State funerals the heralds once again take their place at the front of the royal procession as it enters the place of worship. Historically during the procession of royal funerals (usually of the Sovereign) the heralds would carry a piece of armour, representing the various marks of chivalry. These included the helm and crest, spurs, gauntlet, target (shield of arms), sword and a literal 'coat of arms' (a heraldic surcoat). This procession of chivalry was an integral part of the heraldic royal funeral. One of the most solemn roles for the heralds during a royal funeral is the reading of the full list of the styles and titles of the deceased monarch. On 9 April 2002, Garter King of Arms Peter Gwynn-Jones read out the full styles and titles of Queen Elizabeth the Queen Mother at the end of her funeral service at Westminster Abbey.

=== Granting and proving descent of arms ===
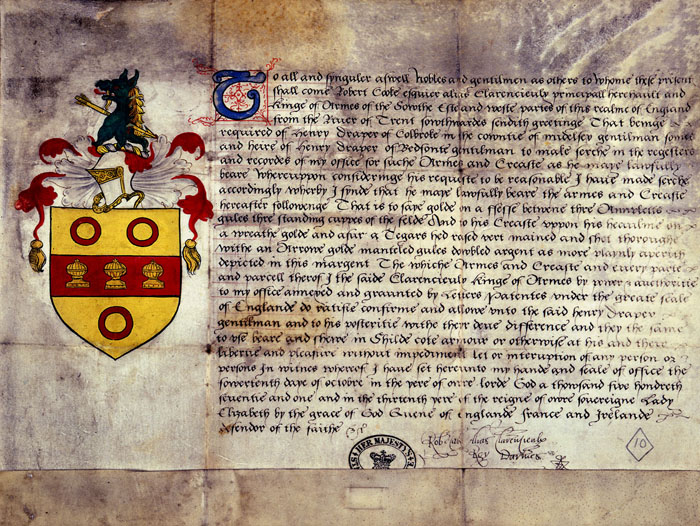
A grant of Arms for Henry Draper of Colnbrook in Berkshire, as issued by the Clarenceux King of Arms, Robert Cooke in 1571. The grant gave him the right to use the arms shown. The blazon reads: Golde, on a ffesse betwene thre Annulettes gules, thre standing cuppes of the felde.

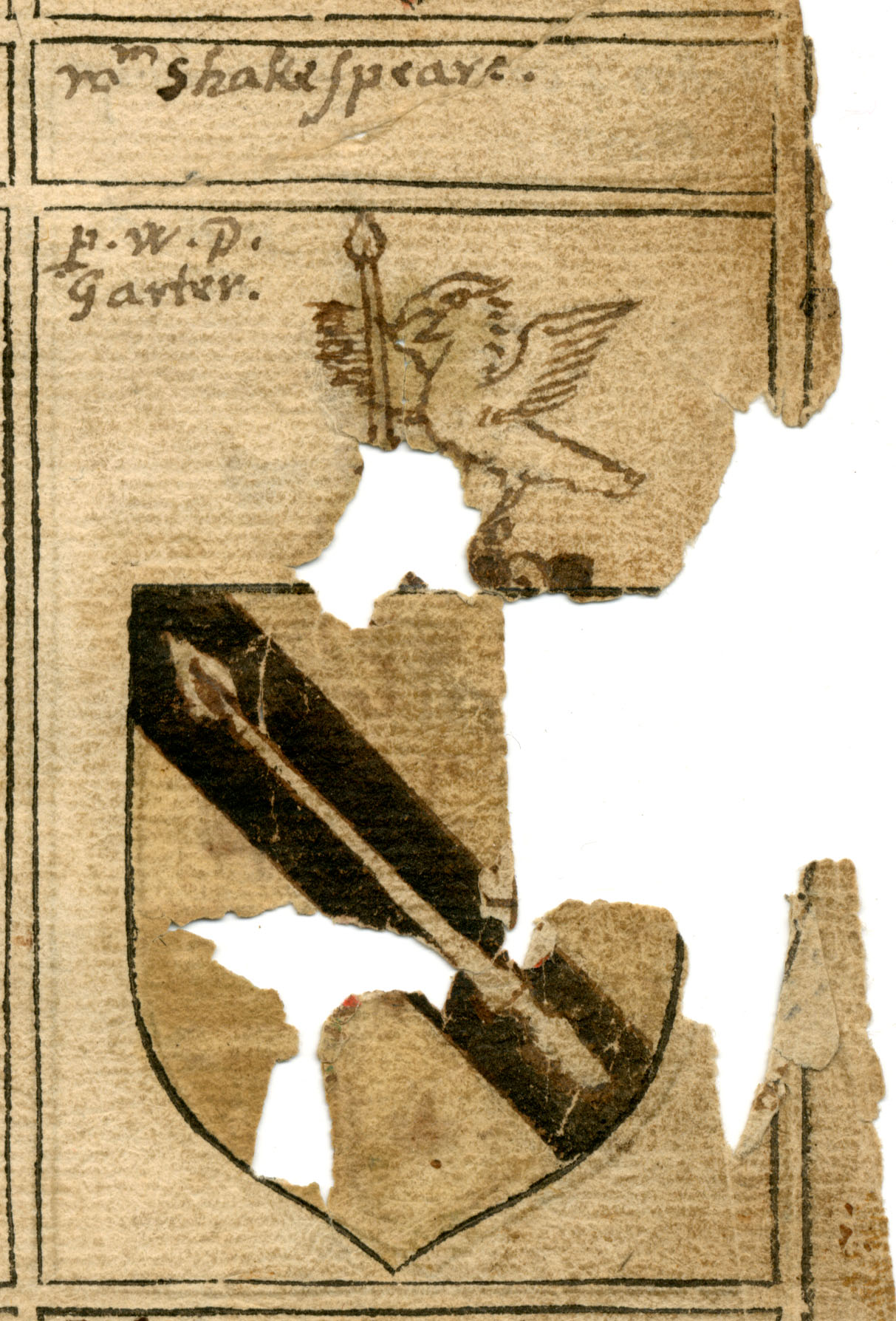
1602 drawing of the Shakespeare coat of arms, granted in 1596

The granting of armorial bearings (coats of arms) within the United Kingdom is the sole prerogative of the British monarch. However, the monarch has delegated this power to two authorities: the Lord Lyon, with jurisdiction over Scotland, and the College of Arms, over England, Wales and Northern Ireland. Under the latter's jurisdiction, the right to arms is acquired exclusively either by proving descent in an unbroken male line from someone registered as so entitled or by a new grant from the King of Arms. Technically, however, arms can also be gained by a grant from the Crown, by prescription (meaning in use since time immemorial), by succeeding to an office, or by marriage. The descent of arms closely follows the Law of heraldic arms, which is a branch of English law, interpreted by civil lawyers in the Court of Chivalry. Sir Edward Coke in his Commentary upon Littleton (1628) wrote that "gentry and armes is the nature of gavelkinde, for they descend to all the sonnes." Arms in England therefore descend to all of the male lines, and not just the most senior alone (unlike in Scotland).

When a new grant of arms is to be made, it is granted through Letters Patent. The Crown delegates all of this authority to the King of Arms; however, before any letters can be issued, they must have a warrant from the Earl Marshal agreeing to the granting of arms. This has been the case since 1673, when the authority of the Earl Marshal, which the heralds had challenged, was established by a royal declaration stating, among other things, that no patents of arms should be granted without his consent. This established the present system whereby royal authority to approve candidates for grants of arms is exercised by the Earl Marshal, and royal authority to grant the arms themselves is exercised by the Kings of Arms. First a petition, called a memorial, is submitted to the Earl Marshal. This memorial will be drawn up for the petitioner by an officer of arms, if it is felt that such a petition would be accepted. Currently there are no set criteria for eligibility for a grant of arms; however, the College recommends that "awards or honours from the Crown, civil or military commissions, university degrees, professional qualifications, public and charitable services, and eminence or good standing in national or local life" will be taken into account.

=== History ===
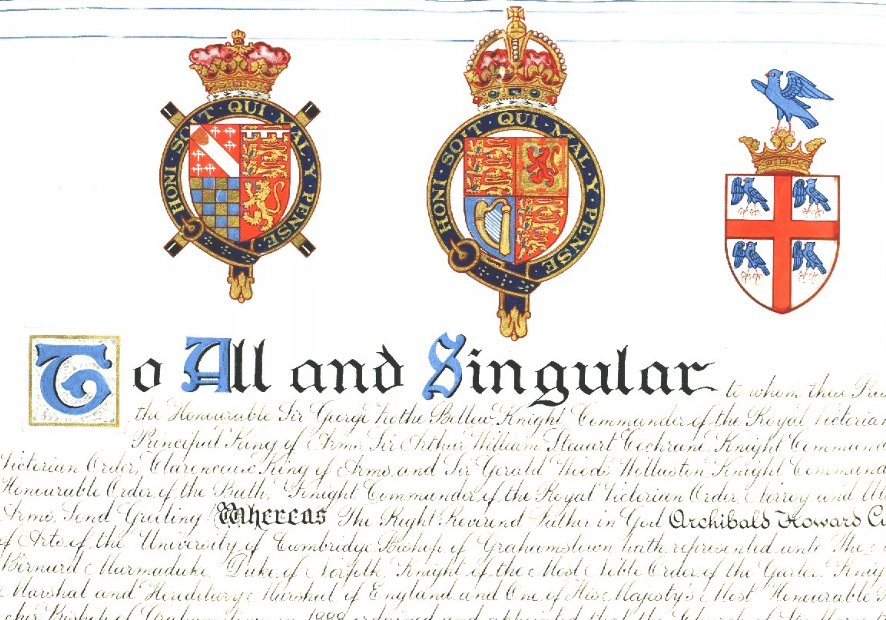
A section of a modern grant of arms for the Rt. Rev Archibald Howard Cullen the 6th Bishop of Grahamstown in South Africa. The grant was issued by the Garter King of Arms, Sir George Rothe Bellew in the 1950s.

In the past this issue of eligibility has been a source of great conflict between the heralds; such submissions are made on an officer for clients basis, which meant some "unsuitability" was ignored in lieu of profit by past officers. Suitability rested on the phrase "eminent men"; originally the test applied was one of wealth or social status, as any man entitled to bear a coat of arms was expected to be a gentleman. By 1530, the heralds applied a property qualification, requiring successful candidates for a grant of arms to have an income from land of £10 per annum, or movable wealth of £300. However, this was not always the case: in 1616 Ralph Brooke, York Herald, tricked Garter King of Arms, William Segar, into granting a coat of arms to Gregory Brandon, a common hangman, for a fee of 22 shillings (£1.10). When the king found out he had them both imprisoned at Marshalsea; they were freed a few days later.

=== Current procedure ===
The fee for the grant of arms is due when the memorial is submitted; the amount is set out in the Earl Marshal's Warrant. As of 1 January 2025 the fees for a personal grant of arms, including a crest, is £9,200; a grant to a non-profit body is £18,940; and to a commercial company is £28,235. This grant may include a grant of a badge, supporters or a standard, depending on the letters patent. The fees mainly go towards commissioning the artwork and calligraphy on the vellum letters patent, which must be done by hand and is in a sense a work of art in itself, plus other administrative costs borne by the heralds, and for the upkeep of the college.

Once the Earl Marshal has approved the petition he will issue his Warrant to the King of Arms. This will allow them to proceed with the granting of the arms. Now the designing and formation of the arms begin. Although the King of Arms has full discretion over the composition of the arms, he will take into full account the wishes of the applicant. These will include allusions and references to the applicant's life and achievements. The design of any new coat of arms must abide by all the rules of heraldry as well as being entirely original and distinct from all previous arms recorded in the college's archives. A preliminary sketch will then be approved and sent to the petitioner for approval.

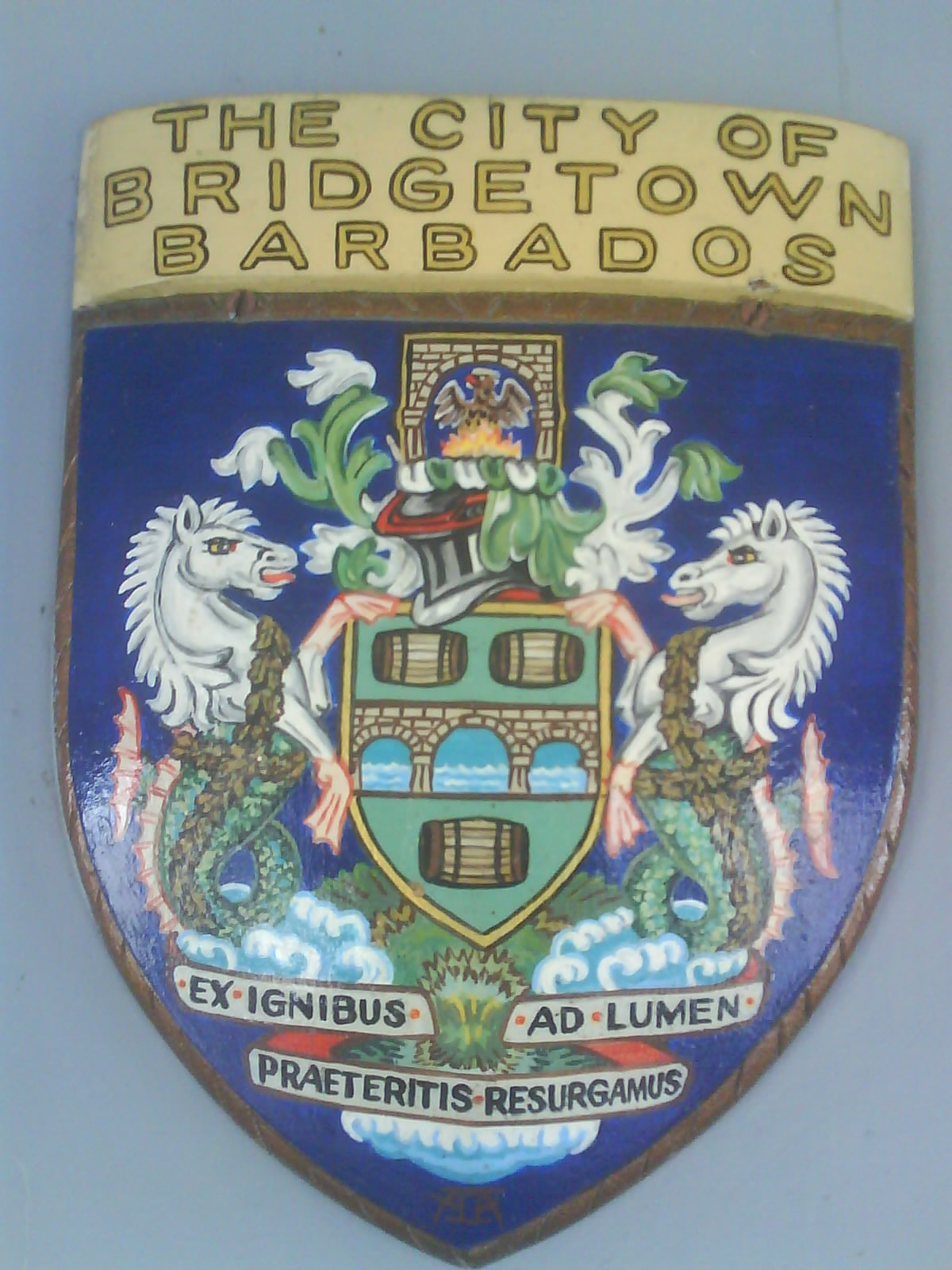
The coat of arms of city of Bridgetown in the capital and largest city of Barbados. The arms were granted to the city on 20 September 1960 by the College of Arms.

As soon as the composition of the blazon is agreed by both parties a final grant can be created. This takes the form of a handmade colourfully illuminated and decorated letters patent. The letter is written and painted in vellum by a college artist and scrivener. The grant is then signed and sealed by the King of Arms. It is then handed to the petitioner, authorising the use of arms blazoned therein as the perpetual property of himself and his heirs. A copy of the grant is always made for the college's own register.

Once granted, a coat of arms becomes the hereditary and inheritable property of the owner and his descendants. But it can only be inherited by a legitimate male-line descendant of the original grantee of the arms. To establish the right to arms by descent, one must be able to prove that an ancestor had his arms recorded in the registers of the college. If there is a possibility of such an inheritance, one must first contact an officer-in-waiting at the college, who could then advise on the course of action and the cost of such a search. The research into a descent of arms requires details of paternal ancestry, which will involve the examination of genealogical records. First there is a search of the family name in the college's archives, as coats of arms and family name has no connection, the officer could prove, through this method, that there is in fact no descent. However, if a connection is found the genealogy would be researched outside of the college's archives to provide definitive evidence of descent from an armigerous individual.

=== Change of names ===
The College of Arms is also an authorised location for enrolling a change of name. In common law there is no obligation to undergo any particular formality to change one's name. However, it is possible to execute a deed poll, more specifically a deed of change of name, as a demonstration of intention to adopt and henceforth use a new name, and deeds poll may be enrolled either in the High Court or in the College. On being enrolled the deed is customarily 'gazetted', that is published in the London Gazette. The deed poll is not entered on the registers, but is still published, if the name change only affects one's given name.

=== Change of name and arms ===
It is also possible to change one's coat of arms, with or without adopting or appending a new surname, by royal licence, that is to say a licence in the form of a warrant from the Crown directed to the Kings of Arms instructing them to exemplify the transferred arms or a version of them to the licensee in his or her new name. Royal licences are issued on the advice of Garter King of Arms and are usually dependent on there being some constraining circumstances such as a testamentary injunction (a requirement in a will) or a good reason to wish to perpetuate a particular coat of arms. A royal licence is of no effect until and unless the exemplification is issued and recorded in the college. Royal licences are gazetted and make a deed poll unnecessary.

=== Genealogical records ===
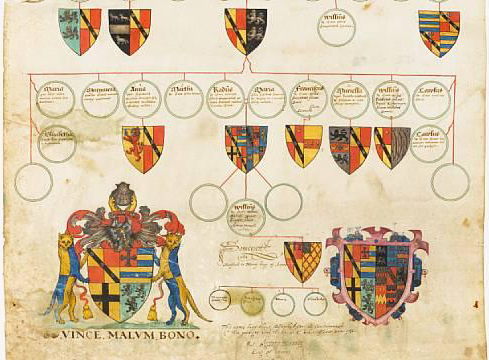
An example of an Elizabethan pedigree of the Euery (de Euro) family of Northumberland, barons of Warkworth and Clavering. Scrivened and illuminated by Somerset Herald, Robert Glover circa 1570 to 1588

Due to the inheritable nature of coats of arms the College have also been involved in genealogy since the 15th century. The College regularly conduct genealogical research for individuals with families in the British Isles of all social classes. As the College is also the official repository of genealogical materials such as pedigree charts and family trees. The College's extensive records within this realm of study dates back over five centuries. An individual could, if he so wishes, have his family's pedigree placed inside the College's records. This would require the services of an officer of the College who would then draft a pedigree. The officer would ensure that the pedigree was in the correct format and also advise the client on the documentary evidences necessary to supports such a draft. After this is done, the officer would submit the pedigree to a chapter of two other officers, who would then examine the pedigree for any mistakes or in some cases demand more research. After this examination is completed the pedigree would then be scrivened and placed into the pedigree register of the College.

=== Roll of the Peerage ===
The House of Lords Act 1999 removed the automatic right of hereditary peers to a seat in the House of Lords. Prior to the passage of this Act, anyone succeeding to a title in the peerage of England, Scotland, Ireland, Great Britain and the United Kingdom, would prove their succession by a writ of summons to Parliament. All peers receiving such writs were enrolled in the Register of Lords Spiritual and Temporal, a document maintained by the Clerk of the Parliaments. As a result of the Act, the Register of Lords Spiritual and Temporal only records the name of life peers and the 92 hereditary peers left in the House of Lords. This meant that the register was incomplete as it excludes most of the other hereditary peers, who are not part of the House of Lords.

On 1 June 2004 a Royal Warrant issued by Queen Elizabeth II states "that it is desirable for a full record to be kept of all of Our subjects who are Peers", this new record would be named the Roll of the Peerage. The warrant was later published in the London Gazette on 11 June 2004. The warrant handed the responsibility of maintaining the roll to the Secretary of State for Constitutional Affairs, in 2007 this responsibility was assumed by the Crown Office within the newly created Ministry of Justice. The warrant also stipulated that the Secretary of State would act in consultation with the Garter King of Arms and the Lord Lyon King of Arms. The roll would then be published by the College of Arms; currently an online edition is available.

=== Outside the UK ===
The College of Arms states that it is the "official heraldic authority for England, Wales, Northern Ireland and much of the Commonwealth including Australia and New Zealand". The position of New Zealand Herald Extraordinary was established in 1978, subordinate to the Garter Principal King of Arms. However, the official status of the college in Australia has not been confirmed by the federal government. The Department of the Prime Minister and Cabinet advised in 2018 that grants from the College of Arms were "well established as one way Australians can obtain heraldic insignia if they wish to do so", but that they had the same status as those by "a local artist, graphics studio or heraldry specialist". The policy of the Australian Heraldry Society is that the College of Arms does not have official heraldic authority over Australia, but that the federal government should establish a national body equivalent to the Canadian Heraldic Authority or South Africa's Bureau of Heraldry.

== Earl Marshal ==
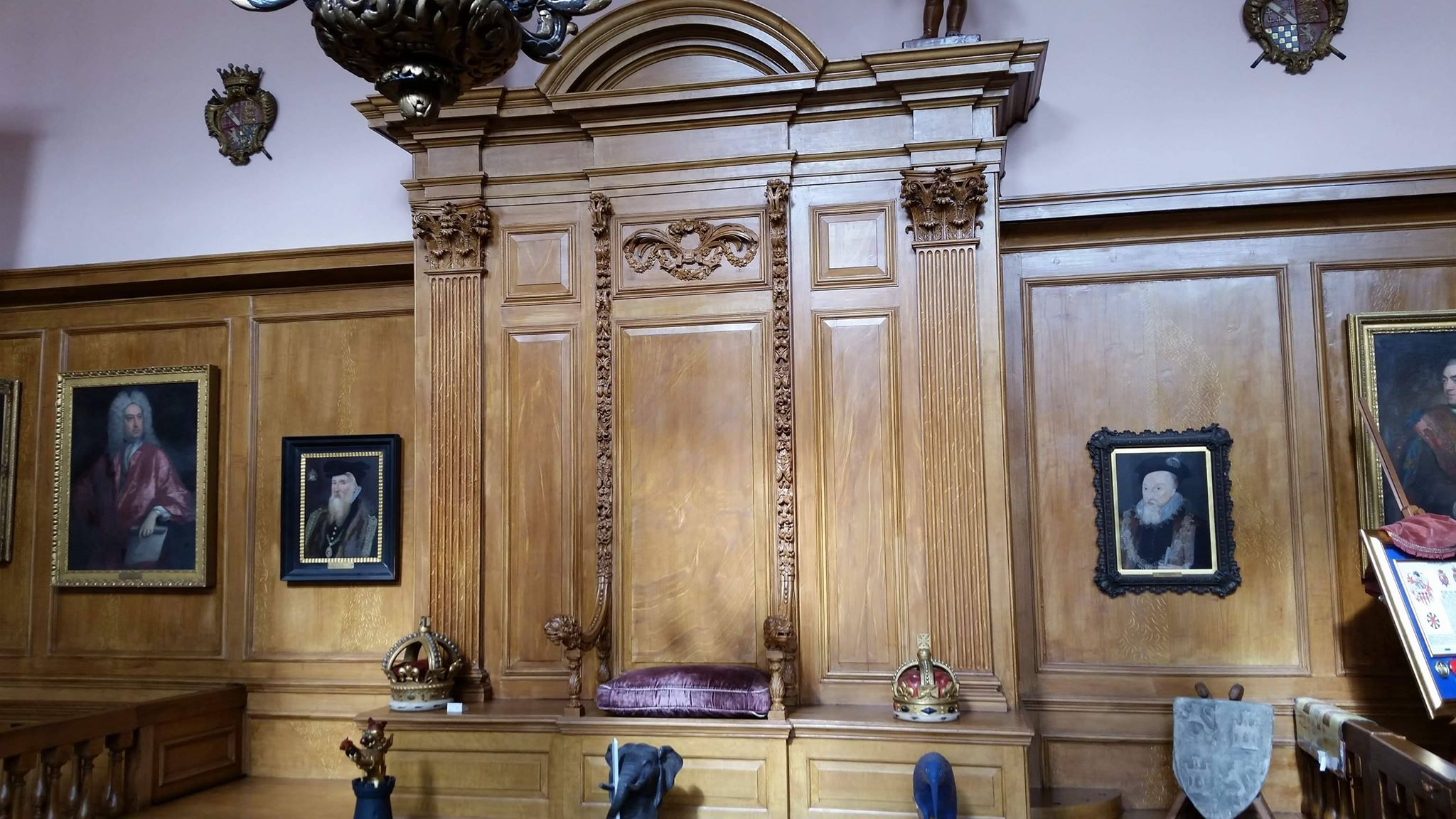
Courtroom of the Earl Marshal, Court of Chivalry, College of Arms, London

The Earl Marshal is one of the Great Officers of State, and the office has existed since 1386. Many of the holders of the office have been related to each other; however, it was not until 1672 that the office became fully hereditary. In that year Henry Howard was appointed to the position by King Charles II. In 1677 he also succeeded to the Dukedom of Norfolk as the 6th Duke, thus combining the two titles for his successors.

The office originates from that of Marshal, one of the English monarch's chief military officers. As such he became responsible for all matters concerning war and together with the Lord High Constable held the joint post as judges of the Court of Chivalry. After the decline of medieval chivalry, the role of Earl Marshal came to concern all matters of state and royal ceremonies. By the 16th century this supervision came to include the College of Arms and its heralds. Thus the Earl Marshal became the head and chief of the College of Arms; all important matters concerning its governance, including the appointment of new heralds, must meet with his approval. The Earl Marshal also has authority over the flying of flags within England and Wales, as does Lord Lyon King of Arms in Scotland. The Officers of Arms at the College of Arms maintain the only official registers of national and other flags and they advise national and local Government, and other bodies and individuals, on the flying of flags.

Head of the College of Arms
Arms	Titles and offices	Name (date of succession)	Notes
	Duke of Norfolk, Earl Marshal and Hereditary Marshal of England	Edward William Fitzalan-Howard, 18th Duke of Norfolk, GCVO, DL (24 June 2002)	Edward, Duke of Norfolk (born 2 December 1956) assumed the office of Earl Marshal on the death of his father Miles, 17th Duke of Norfolk in 2002. The heir-apparent to the office is the incumbent's eldest son, Henry Fitzalan-Howard, Earl of Arundel (born 3 December 1987).

=== Court of Chivalry ===
The High Court of Chivalry or the Earl Marshal's Court is a specialised civil court in England, presided over by the Earl Marshal. The first references made about the court was in 1348. The court has jurisdiction over all matters relating to heraldry as it legalises and enforce decisions of the College of Arms. The court considers all cases relating to questions of status, including disputes over social rank and the law of arms, for example complaints on the infringement of the use of another individual's coat of arms. The Court of Chivalry meets on the premises of the College of Arms; however, the last time it met was in 1954, the first time in 230 years.

== Heralds of the College ==
The College of Arms is a corporation of thirteen heralds, styled Officers in Ordinary. This thirteen can be divided hierarchically into three distinctive ranks: three Kings of Arms, six Heralds of Arms and four Pursuivants of Arms. There are also presently seven Officers Extraordinary, who take part in ceremonial occasions but are not part of the College. As members of the Royal Household, the heralds are appointed at the pleasure of the Sovereign on the recommendation of the Earl Marshal. The Officers in Ordinary are appointed by Letters Patent under the Great Seal of the Realm, and the Officers Extraordinary by Warrants under the Royal Sign Manual; all appointments are announced in the London Gazette.

All of the officers in Ordinary of the College were first instituted at different dates (some even before the incorporation of the College), some originating as private servants of noblemen, some being Royal from the start. They take their names and badges from the titles and royal badges of the monarchs of England. The officers Extraordinary, however, take their names from the titles and estates of the Earl Marshal; they were also created at different dates for ceremonial purposes.

=== Wages ===
The College is almost entirely self-financed, and receives no regular public funding. Its officers do have official salaries, which are paid by the Crown. These salaries were increased in the reign of King James I, but were reduced under William IV. These annual salaries reflected the living costs of the day; however, today the amount is merely a nominal payment. In addition to their official duties, the heralds have for many centuries undertaken private practice in heraldry and genealogy, for which professional fees are charged. HM Treasury pays Garter King of Arms for work undertaken for the Government. As of 27 January 2021, the payments made to Sir Thomas Woodcock since his appointment as Garter totalled £651,515. Additionally, since 2018, the Treasury has provided Garter with an expenses fund of £35,000 per annum to cover business expenses such as secretarial support, cleaning and postage. As of 27 January 2021, Garter has received £74,579.02 to cover expenses.

Officers in Ordinary	1618	1831	Present
Garter King of Arms	£100	£49 1s. 4d	£49.07
Provincial Kings of Arms	£40	£20 5s.	£20.25
Heralds	£26 13s. 4d (40 marks)	£17 16s.	£17.80
Pursuivants	£20	£13 19s.	£13.95

Note: The right-hand column is merely the decimal equivalent of the 1831 column.

=== Uniforms ===
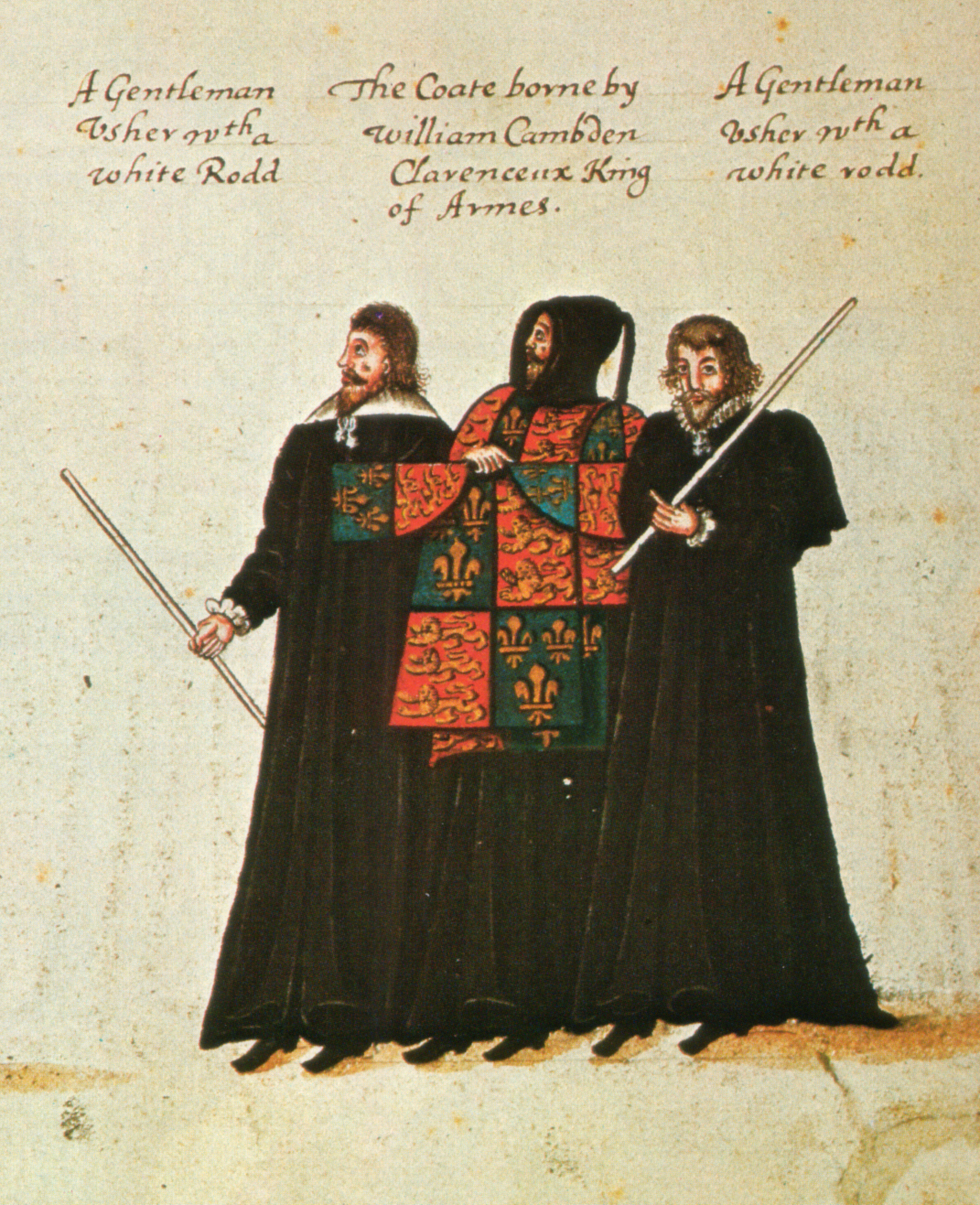
William Camden as Clarenceux King of Arms in the funeral procession of Elizabeth I in 1603. Camden is holding a "coate" possibly a royal tabard or surcoat bearing the Royal Arms of England.

The most recognisable item of the herald's wardrobe has always been their tabards. Since the 13th century, records of this distinctive garment were apparent. At first it is likely that the herald wore his master's cast-off coat, but even from the beginning that would have had special significance, signifying that he was in effect his master's representative. Especially when his master was a sovereign prince, the wearing of his coat would haven given the herald a natural diplomatic status. John Anstis wrote that: "The Wearing the outward Robes of the Prince, hath been esteemed by the Consent of Nations, to be an extraordinary Instance of Favour and Honour, as in the Precedent of Mordecai, under a king of Persia." (a reference to the Book of Esther). The last King of England to have worn a tabard with his arms was probably King Henry VII. Today the herald's tabard is a survivor of history, much like the judges' wigs and (until the last century) the bishop's gaiters.

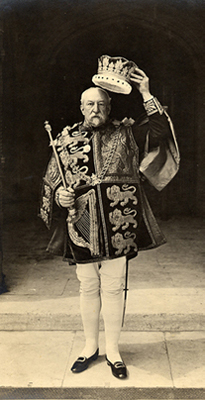
Sir William Henry Weldon, the Norroy King of Arms from 1894 until 1911, wearing the tabard and donning the crown of the King of Arms at the 1902 coronation of King Edward VII

The tabards of the different officers can be distinguished by the type of fabric used to make them. A tabard of a King of Arms is made of velvet and cloth of gold, the tabard of a Herald of satin, and that of a Pursuivant of damask silk. The tabards of all heralds (Ordinary and Extraordinary) are inscribed with the Sovereign's royal arms, richly embroidered. It was once the custom for pursuivants to wear their tabards with the sleeves at the front and back, in fact in 1576 a pursuivant was fined for presuming to wear his tabard like a herald, but this practice was ended during the reign of James II. Until 1888 all tabards were provided to the heralds by the Crown; however, in that year a parsimonious Treasury refused to ask Parliament for funds for the purpose. Ever since then heralds either paid for their own tabards or bought the one used by their predecessors. The newest tabard was made in 1963 for the Welsh Herald Extraordinary. A stock of them is now held by the Lord Chamberlain, from which a loan "during tenure of office" is made upon each appointment. They are often sent to Ede & Ravenscroft for repair or replacement. In addition, heralds and pursuivants wear black velvet caps with a badge embroidered.

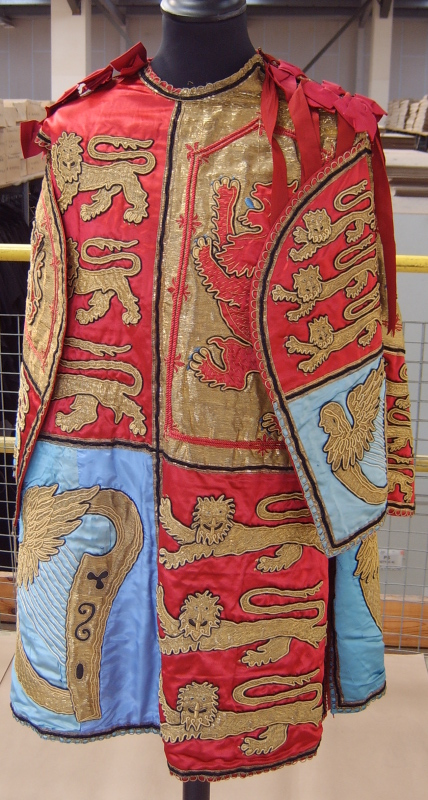
A modern-day tabard of a Herald of Arms, made of silk satin

Apart from the tabards, the heralds also wear scarlet court uniforms with gold embroidery during formal events; with white breeches and stockings for coronations and black for all other times together with black patent court shoes with gold buckles (the Scottish heralds wear black wool serge military style trousers with wide gold oak leaf lace on the side seams and black patent ankle boots; or for women, a long black skirt). The heralds are also entitled to distinctive sceptres, which have been a symbol of their office since the Tudor period. In 1906 new sceptres were made, most likely the initiative of Sir Alfred Scott-Gatty. These take the form of short black batons with gilded ends, each with a representation of the badges of the different offices of the heralds. In 1953 these were replaced by white staves, with gilded metal handles and at its head a blue dove in a golden coronet or a "martinet". These blue martinets are derived from the arms of the College. Another of the heralds' insignia of office is the Collar of SS, which they wear over their uniforms. During inclement weather, a large black cape is worn. At state funerals, they would wear a wide sash of black silk sarsenet (a thin tissue of fine silk) over their tabards. (In ancient times, they would have worn long black hooded cloaks under their tabards.)

The three Kings of Arms have also been entitled to wear a crown since the 13th century. However, it was not until much later that the specific design of the crown was regulated. The silver-gilt crown is composed of sixteen acanthus leaves alternating in height, inscribed with a line from Psalm 51 in Latin: Miserere mei Deus secundum magnam misericordiam tuam (KJV: Have mercy upon me, O God, according to thy lovingkindness). Within the crown is a cap of crimson velvet, lined with ermine, having at the top a large tuft of tassels, wrought in gold. In medieval times the kings of arms were required to wear their crowns and attend to the Sovereign on four high feasts of the year: Christmas, Easter, Whitsuntide and All Saints' Day. Today, the crown is reserved for the most solemn of occasions. The last time these crowns were worn was at the coronation of King Charles III and Queen Camilla in 2023. At other times, kings of arms wear a black bicorne trimmed with white ostrich feathers when performing duties outdoors, or a black velvet cap, depending on circumstances of occasion.

The New Zealand Herald of Arms Extraordinary is a special case when it comes to uniform. Although they do wear the tabard, they only do so when in the UK performing duties. When in New Zealand, they simply wear morning dress as official uniform, together with their chains and baton.

=== Qualifications ===
Heraldic representation of a King of Arms's crown

There are no formal qualifications for a herald, but certain specialist knowledge and discipline are required. Most of the current officers are trained lawyers and historians. Noted heraldist and writer Sir John Ferne wrote in The Glory of Generositie in 1586 that a herald "ought to be a Gentlemen and an Old man not admitting into that sacred office everie glasier, painter & tricker, or a meere blazonner of Armes: for to the office of a herald is requisite the skill of many faculties and professions of literature, and likewise the knowledge of warres." Some of the greatest scholars and eminent antiquarians of their age were members of the College, such as Robert Glover, William Camden, Sir William Dugdale, Elias Ashmole, John Anstis, Sir Anthony Wagner and John Brooke-Little.

Even with these examples, many controversial appointments were made throughout the College's history. For example, in 1704 the architect and dramatist Sir John Vanbrugh was appointed Clarenceux King of Arms, although he knew little of heraldry and genealogy and was known to have ridiculed both. Nevertheless, he was also described as "possibly the most distinguished man who has ever worn a herald's tabard." Noted antiquarian William Oldys, appointed Norroy King of Arms in 1756, was described as being "rarely sober in the afternoon, never after supper", and "much addicted to low company".

=== List of heralds ===
==== Officers in Ordinary ====
Kings of Arms
Arms	Office	Name (date of appointment)	Notes
	Garter King of Arms	James van Someren Peill, MA (Edin), FSA (1 July 2026)	The senior King of Arms (his title is a reference to the Order of the Garter). The office was instituted in 1415 by King Henry V.
	Clarenceux King of Arms	Robert John Baptist Noel, LVO, MA (Oxon), MPhil (Cantab) (28 October 2024)	Whose province is the part of England south of the River Trent. Clarenceux is the senior of the provincial King of Arms. The office was instituted around 1334. Its name derives from the royal Dukedom of Clarence.
	Norroy and Ulster King of Arms	Clive Edwin Alexander Cheesman, MA (Oxon), PhD (San Marino), FSA (14 November 2024)	Whose province is the part of England north of the River Trent (Norroy) and Northern Ireland (Ulster). The office was created in 1943, when the office of Norroy King of Arms and Ulster King of Arms were combined. Independently, the office of Norroy was instituted around 1276, probably the most ancient of all the heralds. While Ulster was instituted in 1552 under Edward VI. "Norroy" is simply French for "north king", while Ulster is the name of a traditional province roughly equivalent to modern-day Northern Ireland.
Heralds of Arms in Ordinary
Badge	Office	Name (date of appointment)	Notes
	York Herald of Arms in Ordinary	Michael Peter Desmond O'Donoghue, MA (Cantab), FSA (31 May 2012)	The first York Herald is believed to have been an officer to Edmund of Langley, 1st Duke of York around the year 1385. The office became a royal herald in 1484.
	Lancaster Herald of Arms in Ordinary	Adam Simon Tuck, MA (Cantab), MA (LCC) (2 November 2023)	Originally a servant of the Earls and Dukes of Lancaster, first appeared in 1347, making a proclamation at the Siege of Calais.
	Somerset Herald of Arms in Ordinary	Mark John Rosborough Scott, MA (Oxon) (12 April 2024)	In the year 1448, Somerset Herald is known to have served the Duke of Somerset.
	Chester Herald of Arms in Ordinary	Dominic Charles Davenport Ingram, MA, MSt, DPhil (Oxon) (2 December 2024)	Said to have been created by King Edward III, as a herald to Edward the Black Prince, who was also Earl of Chester.
	Richmond Herald of Arms in Ordinary	Vacant since 2026	From 1421 to 1485 Richmond was a herald to John of Lancaster, Duke of Bedford, George Plantagent, Duke of Clarence, and Henry, Earl of Richmond, all of whom held the Honour (estate) of Richmond.
	Windsor Herald of Arms in Ordinary	Vacant since 2026	It has been suggested that the office was instituted specifically for the Order of the Garter in 1348, or that it predates the Order and was in use as early as 1338.
Pursuivants of Arms in Ordinary
Badge	Office	Name (date of appointment)	Notes
	Rouge Croix Pursuivant of Arms in Ordinary	Thomas Andrew Johnston, BA (Tasmania) (20 February 2023)	Named after St George's Cross which has been a symbol of England since the time of the Crusades, instituted around 1418.
	Rouge Dragon Pursuivant of Arms in Ordinary	Phillip Alan Bone, BA, MSt, DPhil (Oxon) (6 November 2023)	Instituted by Henry VII on 29 October 1485, the office is named after the red dragon of Wales.
	Portcullis Pursuivant of Arms in Ordinary	Caroline Mariah McWilliams, MA, MLitt (St And) (24 August 2026)	Instituted by Henry VII around 1490 in reference to the badge of his mother Lady Margaret Beaufort.
	Bluemantle Pursuivant of Arms in Ordinary	James Lawson Broun, BA (Oxon), MRes (KCL), PhD (Sus) (25 August 2026)	Said to have been instituted by Henry V for the Order of the Garter service, from where the title probably derives.

==== Officers Extraordinary ====
Officers of Arms Extraordinary
Badge	Office	Name (date of appointment)	Notes
	New Zealand Herald of Arms Extraordinary	Phillip Patrick O'Shea, CNZM, CVO (6 February 1978)	Created in 1978, one special case, who, although not a member of the College, holds a permanent post created to oversee heraldry in New Zealand; he works together with the College to grant new arms for people and bodies in that country (where he himself lives and works). The badge is a crowned Maori koru.
	Maltravers Herald of Arms Extraordinary	John Martin Robinson, MA (St And), DPhil (Oxon), FSA (25 January 1989)	Revived in 1887 by the Earl Marshal, who was also the Duke of Norfolk and Baron Maltravers, originally instituted around 1540.
	Norfolk Herald of Arms Extraordinary	David Rankin-Hunt, CVO, MBE, TD (25 October 1994)	Beginning in 1539 this officer was a herald to the dukes of Norfolk, though the first holder, John James, was paid a salary by King Henry VIII.
	Wales Herald of Arms Extraordinary	Thomas Owen Saunders Lloyd, OBE, DL, MA (Cantab), FSA (2 August 2010)	There was a Wales Herald in the late fourteenth century, around 1393, but the office was short-lived. It was re-established in 1963 as an officer of arms extraordinary.
	Arundel Herald of Arms Extraordinary	Anne Elizabeth Curry, BA, MA (Manc), PhD (Tees), FSA (3 May 2022)	Though a royal herald, Arundel is not a member of the College of Arms, and was originally a private herald in the household of Thomas Fitzalan, Earl of Arundel, originally instituted around 1413. The office was revived in 1727.
	Fitzalan Pursuivant of Arms Extraordinary	Major General Alastair Andrew Bernard Reibey Bruce of Crionaich, CB, OBE, VR, DL (7 October 1998)	As with the other extraordinary offices of arms and inspired by baronies held by the Duke of Norfolk, its appointment was first made for the coronation of Queen Victoria in 1837.

== Armorial achievement of the College ==
Coat of arms of College of Arms
Notes The doves in the arms of the College of Arms are always represented with the sinister wing closed, and dexter wing extended and inverted. The positions of the wings have given rise to much curious speculation. Arthur Charles Fox-Davies wrote in 1909, that the arms was clearly based on the attributed arms of King Edward the Confessor, which was composed of a cross patonce between five martlets, all or. John Brooke-Little on the other hand wrote in 1950 that: "These arms may have been derived from those used by John Wrythe who was Garter at the time of the foundation of the College of Arms in 1484." Adopted 1484 (hypothetical), 1555 (definite) Crest On a ducal coronet or, a dove rising azure Escutcheon Argent, a cross gules (Cross of St. George) between four doves, the dexter wing of each expanded and inverted azure Supporters Two lions rampant guardant argent, ducally gorged or Motto DILIGENT AND SECRET Badge A dove, the dexter wing expanded and inverted azure, ducally gorged or Symbolism The dove has always been a traditional symbol of the herald's office. John de Bado Aureo in his heraldic treatise (c. 1390), wrote that the dove was a messenger of peace and gladness, as appeared in the eighth chapter of the Book of Genesis.

== See also ==
Other institutions linked to the College of Arms

- St Benet Paul's Wharf – The official church of the College
- Heralds' Museum – Former museum displaying objects from the College, situated within Waterloo Barracks, Tower of London (now closed).
- White Lion Society – founded in 1986 as a society to benefit the College of Arms through donations of useful items and publications.
- The Heraldry Society – An organisation devoted to the studying of heraldry.

Similar heraldic authorities in other parts of the world

- Court of the Lord Lyon – Scotland, United Kingdom
- Canadian Heraldic Authority – Canada
- Genealogical Office – Republic of Ireland
- Council of Heraldry and Vexillology - French Community, Belgium
- Flemish Heraldic Council – Flemish Community, Belgium
- Bureau of Heraldry – South Africa
- National Archives of Sweden
- United States Army Institute of Heraldry

Subjects under the jurisdiction of the College

- English heraldry
- Welsh heraldry
- Northern Irish Heraldry
- Australian heraldry
- New Zealand heraldry
