= Edward Walker (officer of arms) =

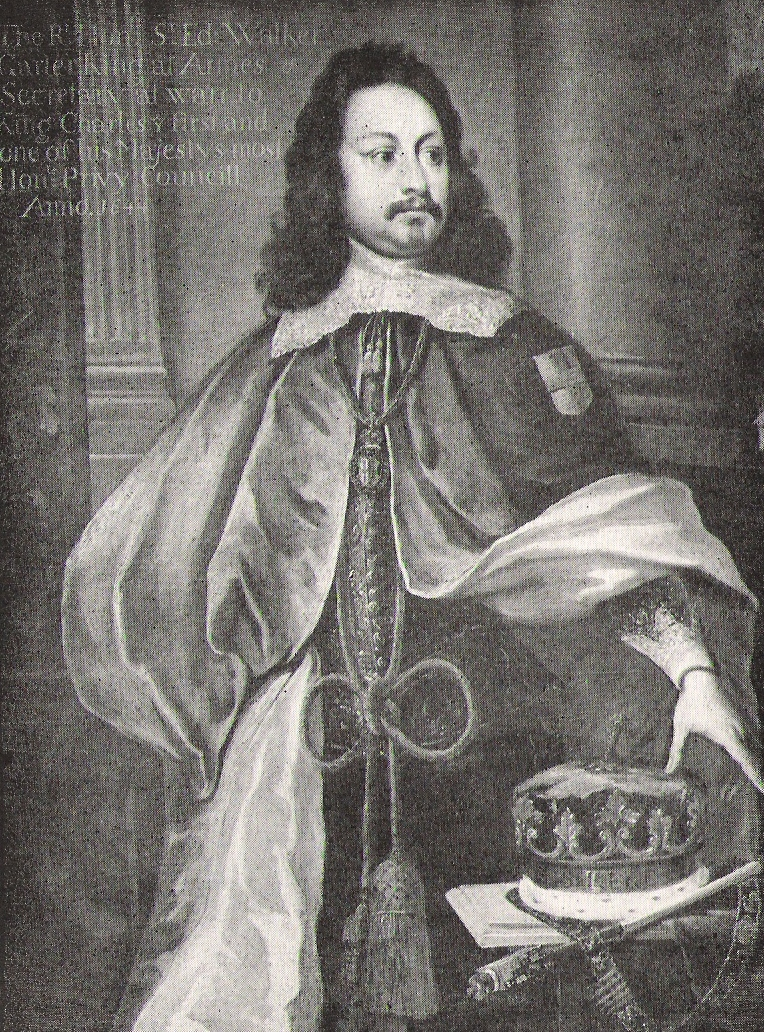
Sir Edward Walker

Sir Edward Walker (1611 – February 1677) was an officer of arms and antiquarian who served as Garter King of Arms.

== Early life ==
Walker was born in 1611 at Roobers in Nether Stowey, Somerset, and entered the household of the great Earl Marshal Thomas Howard in 1633.

== Charles I ==
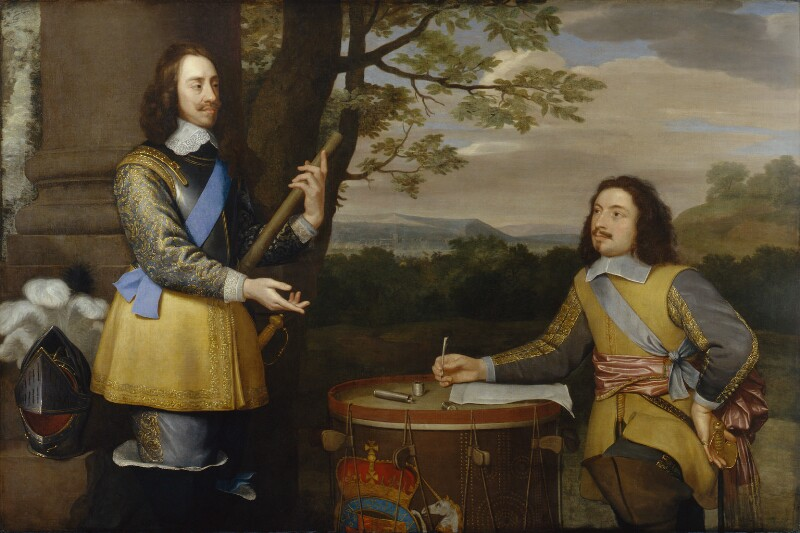
Charles I and Sir Edward Walker, painted c. 1650

Walker was in almost constant attendance on King Charles I during the Civil War as Clerk Extraordinary of the Privy Council, Secretary to the Council of War, Receiver General of the King's Moneys and Secretary for War.

In 1635, Walker was made Blanch Lyon Pursuivant Extraordinary, in 1637 Rouge Croix Pursuivant of Arms in Ordinary, in 1638 Chester Herald of Arms in Ordinary, in 1644 Norroy King of Arms, and in 1645 Garter Principal King of Arms, so that within less than eight years of entering the College of Arms he had attained the highest post.

His appointment as Garter followed shortly on his appointment as Secretary for War and Clerk Extraordinary of the Council, so that it is plain that Charles I thought highly of his abilities.

== Charles II ==
Sir Edward Walker followed Charles II into exile and was with him constantly, not only as his Garter King of Arms but as Clerk of his Privy Council at The Hague in 1649 and at Cologne in 1655. He remained a Clerk of the Council after the King's return from exile in 1660.

His loyalty was further proved by his adherence to Charles II throughout his exile, so that at the Restoration in 1660 he returned to England with the highest personal prestige. Sir Edward Bysshe, who had been intruded as Garter under the Commonwealth of England was removed from that office and Walker was restored to his post.

=== Augmentations of arms ===
Walker then showed arrogance and asserted his claims—justified or unjustified—with so much obstinacy and anger that he threw away his reputation in a vain attempt to raise himself above control.

In 1646, he had possessed from Charles I a special warrant which empowered him to grant augmentations of arms, incorporating royal emblems, to the king's loyal adherents and this power was confirmed to him by Charles II in 1660. Under this he made the well-known grants to Mistress Lane and Colonel Carlos who aided Charles II in his escape, but his later use of it was said to be less scrupulous.

=== Exile of Charles II ===
When in exile with Charles II, without Earl Marshal and without colleagues, he had had all heraldic matters his own way. In 1662, however, Commissioners for the Office of the Earl Marshal were appointed and in 1664 the heralds submitted to them draft orders for the regulation of the College, based on those of 1568 but dealing with certain matters in more detail.

Dugdale, then Norroy, was probably behind these and Walker was said to have a great dislike for Dugdale. The Orders were made in 1668 and provided, among other things, for the registration of their grants by the Kings of Arms, but with this provision neither Walker nor Bysshe (who had been appointed Clarenceux) took any steps to comply.

== Earl Marshal Howard ==
The Commissioners let matters go at that, but in 1672 Charles II revived the office of hereditary Earl Marshal in the Howard family, giving it to Henry Earl of Norwich, later Duke of Norfolk.

The new Earl Marshal was not a man to be trifled with, and very shortly made an order, said to have been drafted by Dugdale, with which he required Walker's compliance. Walker was so ill-advised as to petition the Privy Council claiming a right to grant arms independently of the Earl Marshal's control.

An adverse report was made on this claim, whereupon the King issued a Declaration of the Authority of the Earl Marshal over the heralds, overriding all Walker's claims. Walker then obeyed, but the next year, encouraged by some small success, refused obedience to a command of the Earl Marshal's.

The Earl Marshal, through his deputy, made a petition to the King referring to Walker's insubordination and asking that he should be removed from office or otherwise severely punished.

== Legacy ==
His long and faithful service saved him from punishment by the Earl Marshal's actions, but he was sharply reprimanded and threatened with removal from office if he did not obey. His spirit was broken, he obeyed and soon after, in February 1677, he died.

In 1675, on the death of Shakespeare's granddaughter Lady Barnard, he had bought New Place in Stratford-upon-Avon, The house originally built by Sir Hugh Clopton in 1483/85, purchased by the poet in 1597. Walker was buried in the Church of the Holy Trinity, Stratford-upon-Avon, where a Latin epitaph on the wall of the Lady Chapel commemorates him. He had a good collection of manuscripts, many of which had belonged to Sir William Le Neve. Some of these he gave to the College of Arms in 1673, others he bequeathed to it and yet others to the Office of Garter.

== Arms ==
Coat of arms of Edward Walker
Notes His bookstamp shows a shield of the 1650 augmentation quartering Walker (sans difference) supported in front of a greyhound sejant erect & affronté, collared, the whole in a riband inscribed Loyauté Mon Honneur. Adopted 8 February 1650 Crest A greyhound courant argent, its collar gules charged with 3 gold crowns. Escutcheon Quarterly, (1 & 4) Argent, on a cross gules 5 leopard faces or [augmentation granted by Charles II 8 February 1650]; (2 & 3) Argent, a chevron anchored [i.e. tipped with a short cross-bar & ring] between 3 crescents sable, a crescent for difference on the chevron [Walker]. Badge Out of a king of arms' crown a garb or supported by a blanch lyon & a rouge dragon. Symbolism The leopard faces and greyhounds are royal badges. Previous versions Previously quartering the augmentation & crest granted by Charles I on 1 November 1648; Argent, on a cross gules a greyhound courant argent collared or. This was replaced in 1650.

Preceded by Henry Chitting	Chester Herald of Arms; 1638–1644	Succeeded by William Dugdale
Preceded by Sir Edward Bysshe	Garter King of Arms; 1645–1677	Succeeded by William Dugdale
