= Heraldry of Northern Ireland =

The heraldry of Northern Ireland follows the heraldic traditions of Ireland and England.

At the College of Arms, the Norroy and Ulster King of Arms has the responsibility for Northern Ireland since 1943.
