= Johannes de Bado Aureo =

The identity of the heraldic writer Johannes de Bado Aureo is a matter of dispute. ("Vado Aureo" is a Latinized form of Guildford, in Surrey.) His work, Tractatus de armis, written at the behest of the late Anne of Bohemia (died 1394), consort of Richard II, appeared first in a Latin manuscript that is conventionally dated from the wording of the dedication c.1395. It was widely circulated, and translated into English and Welsh. Its main rival among Latin tractates in the field of heraldry was De Officio Militari by Nicholas Upton (1454), which treated heraldry in the larger context of the arts of war. Both works depend on the first work of heraldic jurisprudence, De Insigniis et Armiis, which was written by a professor of law at the University of Padua, Bartolus de Saxoferato, (Bartolo of Sassoferrato), in the 1350s.

Johannes broke with previous tradition in denying the right of a man-at-arms to assume a coat of arms.

Sir Edward Bysshe published both treatises as Nicholai Vptoni, de Stvdio Militari, Libri Quatuor, Johan. de Bado Aureo, Tractatus de Armis (London, 1654).

Professor Evan John Jones, in Medieval Heraldry: Some Fourteenth Century Heraldic Works (Cardiff: William Lewis, Ltd.) 1943, suggested that "Johannes de Bado Aureo" may have been Bishop Sion Trevor, an ecclesiastic who was trained in Roman law, and rose through the Church hierarchy to become Bishop of St Asaph, Wales.
