= Edward Bysshe (died 1679) =

English barrister, politician and officer of arms

Sir Edward Bysshe FRS (1615?–1679) was an English barrister, politician and officer of arms. He sat in the House of Commons variously between 1640 and 1679 and was Garter King of Arms during the Commonwealth period.

== Life ==
Bysshe was born at Smallfield, Burstow, Surrey, the eldest son of Edward Bysshe a barrister of Lincoln's Inn, and his wife Mary Turnor, daughter of John Turnor of Ham, Bletchingley, Surrey. His ancestors were lords of the manors of Burstow and Horne, and some of them owners also of the manor of Bysshe, or Bysshe Court, in Surrey. In 1633 he became a commoner of Trinity College, Oxford, but before he took a degree he entered Lincoln's Inn, and was called to the bar.

Bysshe was elected Member of Parliament (M.P.) for Bletchingley to the Short Parliament which met at Westminster in April 1640 and to the Long Parliament which met on 3 November 1640. He took the covenant. In about 1643 he was made Garter King of Arms in the place of Sir John Borough, who had followed King Charles I to Oxford. On 20 October 1646 votes were passed in the House of Commons that Bysshe should be Garter King of Arms, and likewise Clarenceux King of Arms, that William Ryley should be Norroy King of Arms, and that a committee should be appointed to regulate their fees. In 1654 Bysshe was chosen burgess MP for Reigate, Surrey, to serve in First Protectorate Parliament which met at Westminster on 3 September 1654. He was returned as member for Gatton Surrey, to the Third Protectorate Parliament which assembled on 27 January 1659.

After the Restoration he was required to leave the office of Garter in favour of Sir Edward Walker, but he obtained a patent dated 10 March 1661 for the office of Clarenceux King of Arms. The latter office was void by the lunacy of Sir William Le Neve, and was given to Bysshe because he had preserved the library of the College of Arms during the Interregnum. The appointment was made in spite of Walker, who alleged that Bysshe had not only usurped, but maladministered the office of Garter, and that if he were created Clarenceux it would be in his power to confirm the grants of arms previously made by him.

Bysshe was knighted on 20 April 1661, and he was elected M.P. for Bletchingley to the Cavalier Parliament which met at Westminster on 8 May. During that parliament, which lasted seventeen years, he is said to have become a pensioner, and to have received £100 every session. Anthony Wood speaks very harshly of Bysshe. In June 1663 he was elected an (Original) Fellow of the Royal Society.

Byshhe died in the parish of St Paul, Covent Garden, at the age of 64. He was buried in the church of St Olave, Jewry.

Bysshe married Margaret Green, daughter of John Green of Boyshall, Essex, serjeant-at-law. She survived him.

== Works ==
Bysshe edited:

- Nicolai Vptoni de Studio Militari Libri Quatuor. Iohan. de Bado Aureo Tractatus de Armis. Henrici Spelmanni Aspilogia. Edoardus Bissæus e Codicibus MSS. primus publici juris fecit, notisque illustravit, London 1654. An edition of the heraldic writings of Nicholas Upton, Johannes de Bado Aureo and Henry Spelman, dedicated to John Selden. The notes, originally written in English by Bysshe, were translated into Latin by David Whitford, an ejected student of Christ Church, Oxford.
- Palladius, de Gentibus Indiæ et Bragmanibus. S. Ambrosius, de Moribus Brachmanorum. Anonymus, de Bragmanibus, London 1665. In Greek and Latin, and dedicated to Lord Clarendon. The translations themselves (from Greek into Latin) were apparently the work of the Christ Church scholar John Gregory (died 1646/47), and passed through the hands of Edmund Chilmead (died 1653/54) before coming to Bysshe.

At one time he contemplated writing the Survey or Antiquities of the County of Surrey, but the work never appeared.

== Arms ==
Coat of arms of Edward Bysshe
Notes This was adopted by Sir Edward's father in 1623 in lieu of arms confirmed by Camden 1 October 1617, which was: Quarterly, (1 & 4) per fess embattled argent & ermine with 3 leopard faces in chief gules (Bysshe); (2 & 3) per saltire or & azure, 2 roses gules and 2 fleurs de lis or (Burstow). Crest: In a mural crown or, a sword erect argent, hilted or, piercing a leopard's face gules. Adopted 1623 Crest A hind (biche) tripping argent. Escutcheon Or, a chevron between 3 roses gules; with many quarterings. Motto Prudens Simpliciter ("Simply wise")

Heraldic offices
Preceded by Henry St George	Garter Principal King of Arms; 1643–1660	Succeeded by Edward Walker
