= Nicholas Upton =

English cleric and writer (died 1457)

Nicholas Upton (1400?–1457), was an English cleric, precentor of Salisbury, and writer on heraldry and the art of war.

== Life ==
He is thought to have been the second son of John Upton of Portlinch, Devon, by his wife Elizabeth, daughter of John Barley of Chencombe in the same county. Nicholas entered as scholar of Winchester College in 1408 under the name ‘Helyer alias Upton, Nicholas,’ and was elected Fellow of New College, Oxford, in 1415, graduating bachelor of civil law. He was ordained subdeacon on 8 March 1421; but he entered the service of Thomas de Montacute, 4th Earl of Salisbury, and fought against the French in Normandy. He also served under William de la Pole, Earl of Suffolk, and John Talbot, later Earl of Shrewsbury. He was with Salisbury at the Siege of Orléans in October–November 1428, when it was relieved by Joan of Arc and Salisbury was killed. Upton was appointed one of the executors of his will.

Soon afterwards Humphrey, Duke of Gloucester persuaded him to continue his clerical career. On 6 April 1431 he was admitted to the prebend of Dyme in Wells Cathedral, and before 2 October 1434 was rector of Chedzoy, Somerset, which he exchanged on that date for the rectory of Stapleford, Wiltshire; he was also rector of Fawley, Hampshire. In 1438 he graduated bachelor of canon law from Broadgates Hall, Oxford, and on 11 April 1443 was collated to the prebend of Wildland in St Paul's Cathedral. He resigned his prebend on his election on 14 May 1446 as precentor of Salisbury Cathedral.

In 1452 he went on a mission to Rome to obtain the canonisation of Osmund, the founder of Salisbury. He reached Rome on 27 June, returning in May 1453 without accomplishing his object. He died in 1457 before 15 July, and was buried in Salisbury Cathedral.

== Works ==
Upton was the author of Libellus de Officio Militari; it was dedicated to Humphrey, Duke of Gloucester, and was therefore written before 1446. It consists of four parts:

- "De Coloribus in Armis et eorum Nobilitate ac Differentia";
- "De Regulis et de Signis";
- "De Animalibus et de Avibus in Armis portatis";
- "De Militia et eorum [sic] Nobilitate".

Upton quotes liberally from Bartolus of Sassoferrato and other jurists.

The book circulated in manuscript for two centuries. Parts were incorporated in the Book of St. Albans; it was transcribed by Robert Glover and it was extensively used by Francis Thynne. It was eventually edited and published by Sir Edward Bysshe from Sir Robert Cotton's manuscript, and from another belonging to Matthew Hale, both procured for Bysshe by John Selden: Bysshe's edition appeared in 1654, and was entitled Nicholai Vptoni de Studio Militari.

== Notes ==
Attribution

This article incorporates text from a publication now in the public domain: "Upton, Nicholas". Dictionary of National Biography. London: Smith, Elder & Co. 1885–1900.
