= Australian heraldry =

Australian coats of arms and other heraldic achievements

- Commonwealth Coat of Arms
- Heraldic tradition: Gallo-British
- Governing body: Disputed

Australian heraldry is the style and tradition of using armorial achievements, sometimes known as coats of arms, and other heraldic bearings and insignia in Australia. It largely follows the Gallo-British tradition of heraldry also followed in England, Scotland, Ireland, Canada and New Zealand.

== Heraldic authority ==
Australia does not have its own heraldic authority which grants or records arms, though the College of Arms in London claims to be "the official heraldic authority" for Australia and much of the Commonwealth. They have issued arms in the name of the Australian monarch. Additionally, the College's Garter Principal King of Arms is mentioned in the ordinances of the Order of Australia. However, the College's authority is disputed by the Australian Heraldry Society.

The Australian Heraldry Society argues that the heraldic authority for Australia is vested in the King of Australia, who can delegate that authority to whomever they choose. In response to questions submitted by the Society, on 7 February 2018 prime minister Malcolm Turnbull stated:

I am advised by the Department of the Prime Minister and Cabinet that ... the practice of the College of Arms in England granting armorial bearings to Australians is well established as one way Australians can obtain heraldic insignia if they wish to do so. There is nothing preventing any person or organisation from commissioning a local artist, graphics studio or heraldry specialist to design and produce a coat of arms or identifying symbol. Those arms would have the same standing and authority in Australia as arms prepared by the College of Arms in England.

Grants of heraldic arms to Australian residents or institutions may be made, depending on their eligibility, by the English College of Arms, Scottish Court of the Lord Lyon, Chief Herald of Ireland, Chief Herald of Canada, State Herald of South Africa or the various authorities in Spain, Belgium, Russia or other places.

== Coats of arms ==
The heraldry of Australia has added indigenous Australian animals to the existing heraldic bestiary, along with native plants and occasionally traditional motifs of Aboriginal Australians and Torres Strait Islanders.

=== National arms ===
Coat of arms of Australia (1912–present)

Coat of arms of Australia (1912–present), escutcheon only

Coat of arms of Australia (1908–1912)

The first official arms of the Commonwealth of Australia were granted by King George V via royal warrant on 7 May 1908.

The official blazon for the 1908 arms was:

Escutcheon: Azure on an inescutcheon argent upon a cross of St. George cottised of the field five six pointed stars of the second (representing the constellation of the Southern Cross) all within an orle of inescutcheons of the second, each charged with a chevron gules.

Crest: On a wreath of the colours a seven-pointed star or.

Supporters: On a compartment of grass to the dexter, a kangaroo, to the sinister an emu both proper.

Motto: Advance Australia

As the 1908 arms did not make any reference to the states, on 19 September 1912 King George V issued another royal warrant granting a new coat of arms to the Commonwealth which incorporated the badges of the six states. These are the current arms.

The official blazon for the 1912 arms is:

Escutcheon: Quarterly of six, the first quarter argent a cross gules charged with a lion passant guardant between on each limb a mullet of eight points or; the second, azure five mullets, one of eight two of seven one of six and one of five points of the first (representing the constellation of the Southern Cross) ensigned with an imperial crown proper; the third of the first, a Maltese cross of the fourth, surmounted by a like imperial crown; the fourth of the third, on a perch wreathed vert and gules an Australian piping shrike displayed also proper; the fifth also or a swan naiant to the sinister sable; the last of the first a lion passant of the second, the whole within a bordure ermine.

Crest: On a wreath or and azure a seven pointed star or.

Supporters: To the dexter a kangaroo, to the sinister an emu, both proper

Although not an official part of the arms, they are typically depicted as framed by stylized branches of golden wattle and with a scroll with the motto "Australia" beneath the shield.

=== Arms of states and territories ===
| Armiger | Image | Date adopted | Heraldic authority | Blazon / Description | Ref. |
|---|---|---|---|---|---|
| New South Wales | | 1906 | Royal warrant | Main article: Coat of arms of New South Wales Escutcheon: Azure a cross argent voided gules charged in the centre chief point with a lion passant guardant, and on each member with a mullet of eight points or between in the first and fourth quarters a fleece or banded argent and in the second and third quarters a garb also or Crest: On a wreath of the colours a rising sun each ray tagged with a flame of fire proper Supporters: On the dexter side a lion rampant guardant: And on the sinister side a kangaroo both or Motto: Orta Recens Quam Pura Nites ("Newly risen, how brightly you shine") | |
| Victoria | | 1910 | Royal warrant | Main article: Coat of arms of Victoria (state) Escutcheon: Azure, five stars argent representing the constellation of the Southern Cross. Crest: On a wreath of the colours a demi-kangaroo proper holding in the paws an imperial crown or. Supporters: On the dexter side a female figure (representing peace) proper vested argent cloaked azure wreathed round the temples with a chaplet and holding in the exterior hand a branch of olive also proper – and on the sinister side a like figure (representing prosperity) vested argent cloaked gules wreathed round the temples with a chaplet of corn and supporting with the exterior hand a cornucopia proper. Motto: Peace and Prosperity | |
| Queensland | | 1893/1977 | Royal warrant | Main article: Coat of arms of Queensland Escutcheon: Per fesse the chief or, the base per pale sable and gules, in chief a bull’s head caboshed in profile muzzled a merino ram’s head respecting each other proper, the dexter base charged with a garb of the first and the sinister base on a mount a pile of quartz, issuant therefrom a gold pyramid, in front of the mount a spade surmounted by a pick saltirewise all proper. Crest: On a wreath of the colours, a mount thereon a Maltese cross azure surmounted with a royal crown between two sugar-canes proper. Supporters: On the dexter side a red deer and on the sinister side a brolga wings elevated and addorsed both proper Motto: Audax at Fidelis ("Bold but Faithful") | |
| South Australia | | 1984 | Royal warrant | Main article: Coat of arms of South Australia Escutcheon: Azure on the rising sun depicted as a roundel or an Australian piping shrike displayed and standing on the staff of a gum tree proper Crest: On a wreath or azure and gules four sprigs of Sturt's desert pea proper Compartment: A grassy mount and in front two vines growing from therefrom each entwining their stakes proper, on either side thereof stalks of wheat and barley and the dexter side scattered with citrus fruits and lying on the sinister side two cog wheels with between them a miner's pick also proper Motto: South Australia | |
| Western Australia | | 1969 | Royal warrant | Main article: Coat of arms of Western Australia Escutcheon: Argent on a base wavy azure charged with a barrulet wavy argent a black swan naiant proper. Crest: On a wreath or and sable the royal crown between two kangaroo paw (Anigozanthos manglesii) flowers slipped proper. Supporters: On either side a kangaroo holding in the exterior fore-paw a boomerang proper. | |
| Tasmania | | 1917 | Royal warrant | Main article: Coat of arms of Tasmania Escutcheon: Quarterly gules and barry wavy argent and azure a fesse of the second charged with a ram statant proper between in chief a garb and a thunderbolt and in base four apples and a branch of hops all or Crest: On a wreath argent a gules: a lion statant gules resting the dexter fore paw on a shovel and a pick-axe in saltire proper Supporters: On either side a Tasmanian tiger proper Motto: Ubertas et Fidelitas ("Fertility and Faithfulness") | |
| ACT / City of Canberra | | 1928 | Royal warrant | Main article: Coat of arms of Canberra Escutcheon: A triple-towered castle between in chief a sword of justice point upwards to the sinister surmounted by a parliamentary mace head upwards to the dexter in saltire charged at their point of intersection with a representation of the imperial crown and in base a rose barbed and seeded (being the badge of York) Crest: In front of a gum tree issuant from a mount a portcullis ensigned with the imperial crown Supporters: On the dexter side a swan sable beaked gules and on the sinister side a white swan proper Motto: For the King, the Law and the People | |
| Northern Territory | | 1978 | Royal warrant | Main article: Coat of arms of the Northern Territory Escutcheon: Tenny, representations in the Australian Aboriginal manner of an Arnhem Land rock painting of a woman with stylised internal anatomy between in dexter chief and base two symbolic representations of campsites joined by journey or path markings in the manner of the Central Australian Aboriginals and in sinister chief and base the like, all argent Crest: Upon a wreath of the colours a wedge-tailed eagle (Aquila audax) wings elevated grasping with its talons an Australian Aboriginal stone Tjurunga proper Supporters: On either side a red kangaroo (Megaleia rufa) guardant that to the dexter holding in the dexter fore-paw a Chiragra spider conch (Lambis chiragra) and similarly that to the sinister in its sinister fore-paw a true heart cockle (Corculum cardissa) growing from [the compartment]. Compartment: A grassy sandy mound Sturt's desert roses (Gossypium sturtianum). | |
| Norfolk Island | | 1980 | Royal warrant | Main article: Coat of arms of Norfolk Island Escutcheon: Per chevron azure and argent in chief two mullets of the last and in base issuant from a rocky mount charged with a book expanded proper edged or leathered gules a Norfolk Island pine proper Crest: Out of a naval crown azure a demi-lion or gorged with a laurel wreath proper and holding a covered cup or Supporters: On the dexter side a lion and on the sinister side a kangaroo proper each resting the exterior foreleg on an anchor erect azure Motto: Inasmuch | |

=== Civic arms ===
The following is a non-exhaustive list of civic heraldry in Australia:

| Armiger | Image | Date adopted | Heraldic authority | Blazon / Description | Ref. |
|---|---|---|---|---|---|
| City of Sydney | | 1908–1996 | College of Arms | Escutcheon: Per fesse or and azure, a three-masted ship in full sail argent, on a chief between the arms of Townshend (viz., gules, a chevron ermine between three escallops argent, and a crescent or for difference) and the arms of Hughes (viz., gules, a chevron between three lions rampant or, on a chief arched argent two roses of the field, a crescent or for difference) a pale argent charged with a cross gules, thereon a globe proper between two estoiles of the first in pale. Crest: On a wreath of the colours an anchor erect ensigned by a mullet of six points gules and enfiled by a civic crown or. Supporters: On the dexter side an aboriginal of Australia holding in the exterior hand a native spear and on the sinister a sailor of the 18th century armed with a cutlass and a brace of pistols in his belt holding in the exterior hand a boat hook all proper. Motto: I take but I surrender | |
| City of Sydney | | 1996 | Assumed | Main article: Coat of arms of Sydney The coat of arms as adopted by the city of Sydney in 1996 borrows elements from the 1908 arms. The shield of the arms is blue, charged with a white anchor enfiled by a golden mural crown and with, in chief, a stylized version of the chief from the 1908 arms in gold, white and blue. For the crest it has a golden six-pointed star. For the supporters, on the left it has a blue snake covered with gold and white markings in the style of the Eora, representing the Rainbow Serpent, and on the right it has a coiled rope, both entwined beneath the shield. Motto: City of Sydney | |
| City of Melbourne | | 1970 | College of Arms | Main article: Coat of arms of Melbourne Escutcheon: Argent, on a cross cotised gules, between in the first quarter a fleece proper banded azure ringed gules, in the second quarter on a mount a black bull statant, in the third quarter on waves of the sea a whale naiant spouting, and in the fourth quarter on waves of the sea a three-masted ship in full sail, a representation of the royal crown all also proper. Crest: On a wreath of the colours, out of a mural crown or, a demi kangaroo to the sinister regardant proper. Supporters: On either side a lion rampant or crowned with a mural crown sable and gorged with a collar gules charged with two mullets argent attached thereto a chain reflexed over the back also gules. Motto: Vires Acquirit Eundo ("We gather strength as we go") | |
| City of Brisbane | | 1948 | College of Arms | Main article: Coat of arms of Brisbane Escutcheon: Barry wavy of six argent and azure a caduceus or on a chief nebuly of the second a Stafford knot of the third between two mullets of the first. Crest: On a wreath or and azure out of mural crown gules a leopard's head couped or between two palm branches slipped vert. Supporters: On either side a gryphon proper charged on the neck with a bar wavy azure. Motto: Meliora Sequimur ("We aim for the best") | |
| City of Adelaide | | 1929 | College of Arms | Main article: Coat of arms of Adelaide Escutcheon: Azure, a cross or surmounted by another gules between in the first quarter a three-masted ship in full sail proper, in the second quarter a golden fleece, in the third quarter a bull's head caboshed also proper, and in the fourth quarter a garb also or, the shield ensigned by a mural crown gold. Crest: On a wreath of the colours a dexter arm embowed proper sleeved above the elbow argent, and grasping in the hand a miner's pick point upwards also proper. Supporters: On the dexter side a lion guardant or, and on the sinister side a kangaroo gules. Motto: Ut Prosint Omnibus Conjuncti ("United for the common good") | |
| City of Perth | | 1926 | | Main article: Coat of arms of Perth Escutcheon: Argent a cross gules, in the first quarter a swan sable upon water proper, and in the fourth quarter on an escutcheon gules within a double tressure counter flory a holy lamb passant reguardant, staff and cross argent with the banner of St Andrew proper Crest: A mural crown or Supporters: On either side a swan wings elevated sable, beaked and legged gules, and gorged round the neck with a mural crown or Motto: Floreat ("Flourish") | |
| City of Hobart | | 1953 | | Main article: Coat of arms of Hobart Escutcheon: Azure an estoile or on a chief argent a lion passant gules. Crest: On a wreath argent and azure a three masted sailing ship (representing the Flying Childers) in full sail or, mantled azure doubled or. Supporters: On the dexter side an emu and on the sinister side a kangaroo both reguardant and each gorged with a chaplet of apples leaved all proper. Motto: Sic Fortis Hobartia Crevit ("Thus in strength did Hobart grow") | |
| City of Darwin | | 1959 | | Main article: Coat of arms of Darwin Escutcheon: Gules, on a fess per pale azure and argent between in chief a castle also argent, the portcullis raised sable, and in base a sun irradiated or within an annulet likewise argent, a wooden aeroplane propeller of early pattern erect proper, winged argent, and on water barry wavy proper a sailing ship of two masts in full sail also proper. Crest: Out of a mural crown proper a mariner's compass gules, the rose or, the needle pointing to the north also gules. Supporters: On the dexter side an Australian Aborigine with tribal markings proper holding in the exterior hand a native shield and supporting by the interior hand a spear point upwards also proper, and on the sinister side a British settler supporting with the exterior hand a pick and shovel likewise proper. Compartment: A mount vert. Motto: Progrediamur ("Let us go forward") | |
| City of Launceston | | 1957 | College of Arms | Escutcheon: Or on a pall reversed azure a bezant in centre point and an ingot of tin proper on each of the lower limbs on a chief indented vert three waratah flowers stalked and leaved also proper. Crest: On a wreath of the colours a branch of gum tree leaved proper thereon a yellow wattlebird holding in the beak a sprig of the same also proper. Supporters: Two Tasmanian tigers proper gorged and chained azure. Motto: Progress with Prudence | |
| City of Wagga Wagga | | 1965 | College of Arms | Escutcheon: Vert on a fess between in chief eight stalks of wheat each four in the form of the letter W and in base a merino ram's head caboshed all or a bar wavy azure. Crest: Out of a mural crown in front of a caduceus or winged sable eight leaves of the river red gum tree (Eucalyptus camaldulensis) conjoined and in the form of two letters W proper. Mantled vert doubled or. Supporters: On either side a crow wings addorsed proper gorged with a collar dancetty or and perched on a forked twig the whole upon a compartment of grass divided by water barry wavy argent and azure. Motto: Forward in Faith | |

=== Personal arms ===
Coat of arms of former governor-general Sir Ninian Stephen

Shield of the coat of arms of former governor-general Sir Paul Hasluck

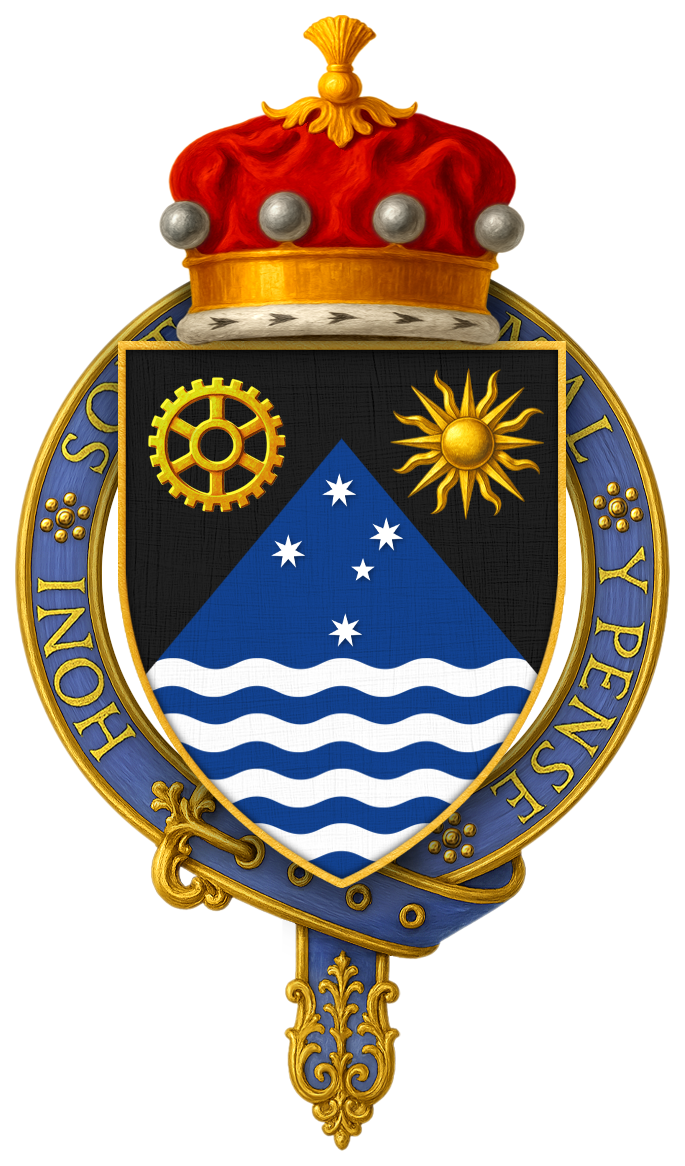
Shield of the coat of arms of former governor-general Lord Richard Casey

Shield of the coat of arms of prime minister Sir Robert Menzies

=== Corporate/Institutional arms ===
Coat of arms of Monash University

Coat of arms of the ANZ Bank

Coat of arms of the Bank of New South Wales

Coat of arms of David Jones

Coat of arms of CPA Australia

== Badges ==
Badge of the Governor-General of Australia

Badge of New South Wales

Badge of Victoria

Badge of Queensland

Badge of South Australia

Badge of South Australia (1876–1904)

Badge of Western Australia

Badge of Tasmania

Badge of the Northern Territory

== Heraldry Society ==
The Australian Heraldry Society was founded in Melbourne in 1992, originally as Heraldry Australia before changing its name in 2008. The society has its roots in the Australian branch of The Heraldry Society of England, which was established in Melbourne in 1973.

The object of the society is "to promote the advancement of education in the science, art, history, practice and development of heraldry and allied subjects and the encouragement of their study and practice in Australia". They produce a bi-monthly newsletter, called The Red Escutcheon, and a triannual journal, called Heraldry in Australia.
