= Coat of arms of Hobart =

Coat of Arms of the City of Hobart
- Armiger: Lord Mayor of Hobart
- Adopted: 1953
- Crest: Ship
- Torse: Silver and Blue
- Shield: Red Lion and Six-pointed Star (with wavy rays)
- Supporters: Emu and kangaroo
- Compartment: Green island with two of native flora, the Richea and the Tasmanian Waratah, and the blue wavy lines
- Motto: Latin: Sic Fortis Hobartia Crevit

The coat of arms of Hobart was formally granted to the Lord Mayor, Aldermen and Citizens of the City of Hobart in Tasmania on 1 May 1953.

The coat of arms was designed in the year 1951 by Hobart architect and alderman, I.G. Anderson, and it replaced an earlier unofficial crest used by the Corporation since the 1850s.

== Blazon ==
=== Shield ===
The shield is of divided into two colours silver and blue.

- The upper part of the shield has a red lion walking to the right on a silver background. The red lion is taken from the Tasmanian flag and its location at the top of the shield signifies Hobart's position as the Capital City.
- The lower part of the shield has a gold six-pointed star with wavy rays on a blue background. The star is derived from the arms of Lord Robert Hobart, 4th Earl of Buckinghamshire, he was the Secretary of State for War and the Colonies in 1804 at the time of colonial settlement, and after whom city of Hobart is named. The colour used on the arms of Lord Hobart was, in fact, sable (black), rather than blue.

=== Crest ===
Above the shield is the silver helmet with gold and blue mantling and above the helmet is a silver and blue wreath, upon which is set a gold three-masted ship (the Flying Childers). The helmet has mantling of blue and gold.

The helmet is associated with civic heraldry and is often used for municipal authorities. The ship was a whaling ship, "The Flying Childers", built in Battery Point by John Watson in 1846, and signifies the importance of shipping and whaling to Hobart's industrial and economic development.

=== Supporters ===
On the left side of shield there are the same animals which are an emu, and on the right side a kangaroo, both with their heads looking back, and each with a collar, comprising a small garland of apples and leaves.

The Tasmanian emu and the forester kangaroo are taken from the Council's unofficial crest, used from the 1850s, and also provide a connection with the Coat of arms of Australia. The animals have collars to deliberately distinguish them from the national coat of arms; the apples signify the importance of the apple industry to the state, commonly known for many years as the "Apple Isle".

=== Compartment ===
The base of the shield is a green island, and the blue wavy lines represent the surrounding seas. Growing upon the island are two of native flora, the Richea and the Tasmanian Waratah.

=== Motto ===
A scroll below the arms reads Sic Fortis Hobartia Crevit translates as Thus in strength did Hobart grow.

The motto Sic fortis Hobartia crevit was part of the Council's old Common Seal and was retained when the new Coat of Arms was introduced.

== See also ==
- Australian heraldry
