= Coat of arms of the Northern Territory =

Official coat of arms

- Adopted: 1978; 48 years ago
- Crest: A Wedge tailed Eagle wings elevated grasping with its talons an Australian Aboriginal stone Tjurunga proper
- Torse: Argent and tenné
- Shield: Tenné, representations in the Australian Aboriginal manner of an Arnhem Land rock painting of a woman with stylised internal anatomy between in dexter chief and base two symbolic representations of camp sites joined by journey or path markings in the manner of the Central Australian Aboriginals and in sinister chief and base the like, all Argent
- Supporters: On either side a Red Kangaroo guardant, that to the dexter holding in the dexter forepaw a Chiragra Spider Conch (Lambis Chiragra) and similarly that to the sinister in its sinister forepaw a True Heart Cockle (Corculum Cardissa)
- Compartment: Growing from a Compartment comprising a grassy sandy mound Sturt's Desert Roses as the same as depicted in the illustration
- Motto: None
- Order: None

The coat of arms of the Northern Territory is the official heraldic symbol representing the Australian territory. They were officially granted by royal warrant from Queen Elizabeth II on 11 September 1978. The arms, uniquely in Australia, incorporate all of the territory's floral, animal and bird emblems: the Sturt's desert rose (Gossypium sturtianum), red kangaroo (Megaleia rufa) and wedge-tailed eagle (Aquila audax).

The Northern Territory's arms incorporate many reflections of the indigenous Australian culture and history: the shield itself is a representation of an Aboriginal painting and the crest shows the wedge-tailed eagle on top of a tjurunga, an Aboriginal ritual stone.

== Blazon ==
The formal description, or blazon, of the arms is:

Tenny, representations in the Australian Aboriginal manner of an Arnhem Land rock painting of a woman with stylised internal anatomy between in dexter chief and base two symbolic representations of camp sites joined by journey or path markings in the manner of the Central Australian Aboriginals and in sinister chief and base the like, all Argent; And for the crest: upon a wreath a Wedgetailed Eagle wings elevated grasping with its talons an Australian Aboriginal stone Tjurunga proper; And for the supporters: On either side a Red Kangaroo guardant, that to the dexter holding in the dexter forepaw a Chiragra Spider Conch (Lambis Chiragra) and similarly that to the sinister in its sinister forepaw a True Heart Cockle (Corculum Carelissa) [sic]; (Note: Apparently a misspelling of Corculum cardissa.) And for the Compartment: Growing from a Compartment comprising a grassy sandy mound Sturt's Desert Roses as the same as depicted in the illustration.

== See also ==
- Flag of the Northern Territory
- Government of the Northern Territory
- Coat of arms of Nunavut, another example of territorial arms reposing heavily on indigenous imagery
- Australian heraldry
