= Coat of arms of Queensland =

Versions
- State Badge of Queensland
- Adopted: 1893
- Crest: Two stalks of sugarcane surround the State Badge, a Maltese Cross with a centred crown
- Torse: Vert and or
- Shield: Wheat sheaf, gold rising from a pile of quartz, the heads of a bull and a ram
- Supporters: Red deer and brolga
- Motto: Audax at Fidelis 'Bold but Faithful'

The coat of arms of Queensland is one of the formal symbols of the Australian state of Queensland and represents the King's constitutional authority throughout the state. It is the oldest of the state arms of Australia, having been granted in 1893 by Queen Victoria, through the simplest heraldic grants of only the shield of arms, motto, helmet, mantling and crest. In 1977, the red deer and the brolga were assigned as supporters by Queen Elizabeth II during her Silver Jubilee. The arms appear in the Legislative Assembly of the Parliament, in courtrooms and a stylised version has been used as the Queensland Government's corporate logo since 2012.

== History ==
The original coat of arms were designed by Sir Albert Woods, Garter King of Arms (head) of the Heralds College. He created four different designs (produced below) which were sent to the Chief Secretary and Premier of Queensland, Sir Samuel Griffith who selected the design that Woods favoured. In order to ensure secrecy, the choice of arms was communicated by telegraph to London using the respective code words, "Halfpay", "Halfprice", "Iceblink" and "Icebound".

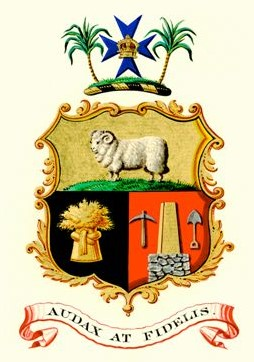
Proposed design "A" (Halfpay)

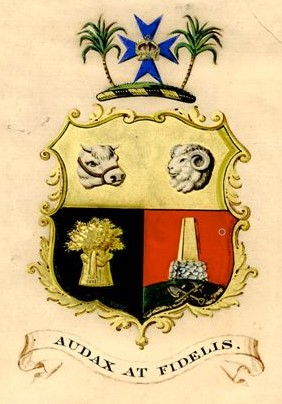
Proposed and ultimately selected design "B" (Halfprice)

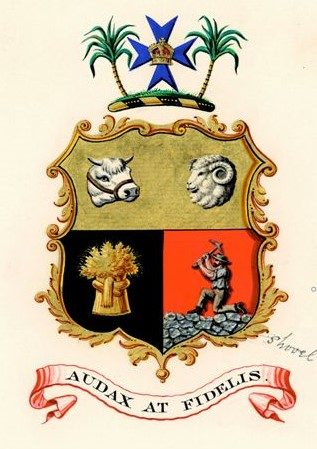
Proposed design "C" (Iceblink)

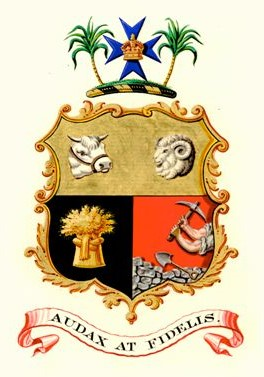
Proposed design "D" (Icebound)

In 1963 the heraldic depiction of the British Imperial Crown was switched to a depiction of St Edward's Crown.

The final and current addition to the coat of arms was created in 1977, the Silver Jubilee of Queen Elizabeth II, with the granting of the red deer and brolga as supporting animals. The deer represents the old world and it is a classic animal of heraldry while the brolga represents the native population and is also the state's official bird.

== Heraldic description ==
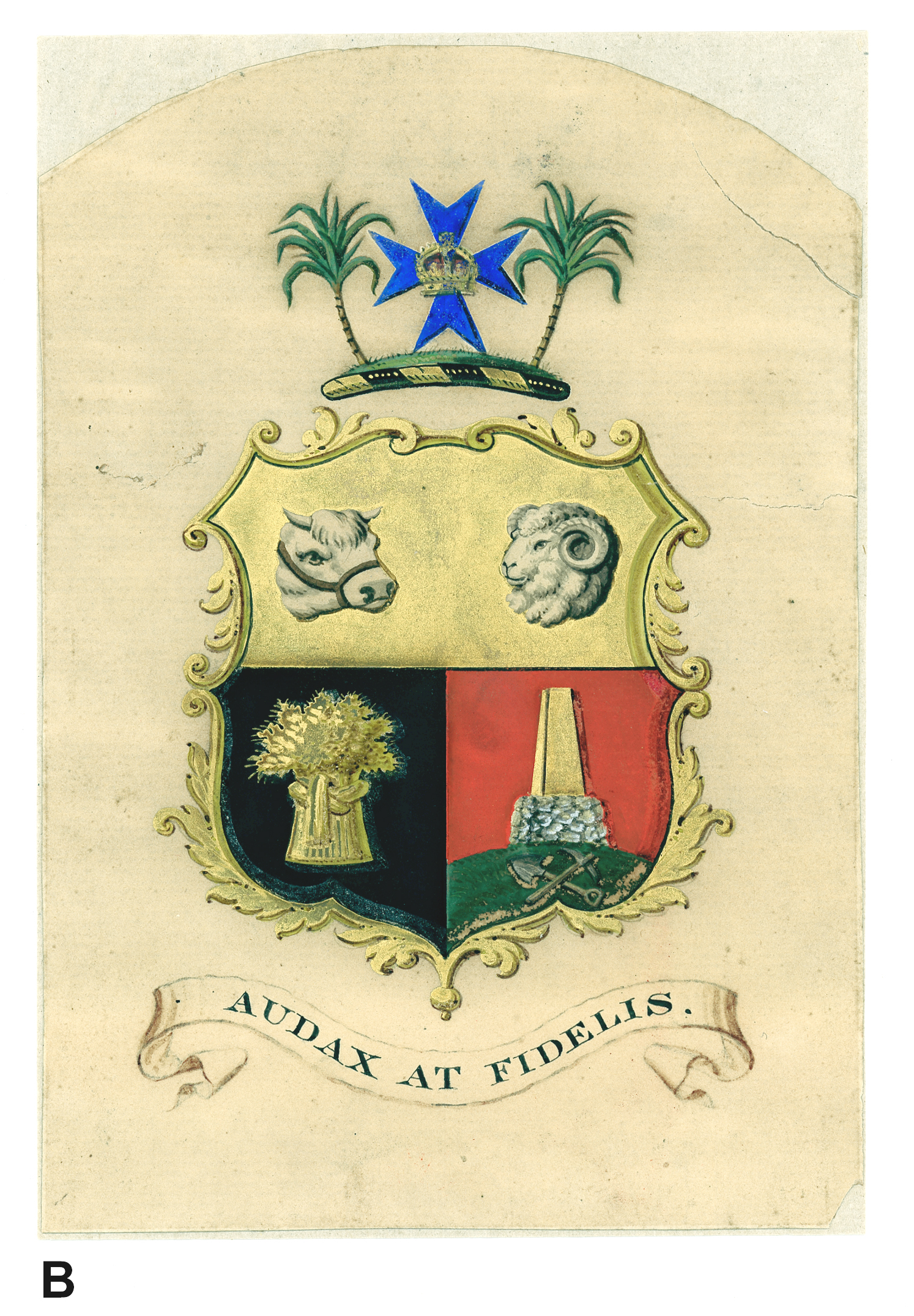
Coat of Arms of Queensland, 1893

The blazon of the coat of arms is:

For arms, per fesse the Chief Or, the Base per pale Sable and Gules, in Chief a Bull’s head caboshed in profile muzzled a Merino Ram’s head respecting each other proper, the dexter Base harged with a Garb also Or and the sinister Base on a Mount a Pile of Quartz issuant therefrom a Gold Pyramid in front of the Mount a Spade surmounted by a Pick saltirewise all proper.

And for the crest, on a wreath of the Colours, a Mount thereon a Maltese Cross Azure surmounted with a Royal Crown between 2 sugar-canes all proper.

And for the Supporters, on the dexter side a Red Deer and on the sinister side a Brolga wings elevated and addorsed both proper, below on a scroll this motto, 'Audax at Fidelis'.

Modernised, this means:

Across the top of the shield a gold panel on which there is a bull's head in profile muzzled, cut off at the neck and a merino ram's head, facing each other, both naturally coloured. In the lower portion of the shield on the left hand side on the black background a golden sheaf of wheat; on the right side on a red background and on a green mound, a golden obelisk standing on a pile of quartz with a crossed pick and shovel in the foreground.

== Symbolism ==
=== Industrial influence ===
The symbols on the shield represent what Queensland's largest industries at the time the arms were designed. The wheat industry's origins belong with the first settlers in 1788, as the farms were worked by the convicts brought over from England, an idea of Governor Phillip. During the years till 1795, the wheat industry slowly gained popularity and by the late 19th century was a strong force in the agricultural industry of the state. The sugar industry became established by 1868 in Mackay which was a mere four years after the first commercial sugar mill was opened in Cleveland, south of Brisbane. Sugar and Coffee regulations were brought in by Parliament later that year as the industry spread rapidly and with the creation of the Mackay Central Sugar Mill Manufacturing Company ten years later in 1878, the sugar industry had reached its colonial peak.

The sheep industry had been in existence since the early 1820s within Australia and by the early 1880s the geographical expansion of this industry had hit Queensland in which major wool auctions were held throughout the state. The mining industry began with the discovery of copper on 20 May 1867 by Ernest Henry in Cloncurry and the industry climbed with the Gold Rush which occurred on 3 September 1873 when gold was discovered in Georgetown. The beef industry was quite prevalent by the late 1880s and by 1890, Queensland had exported Australia's first major export overseas which consisted of 1500 tons and by the 20th century that number had exploded to 43,000 tons.

=== Supporting animals ===
The brolga is one of Australia's two native crane species and the only one solely found in Australia. They stand 1 m tall with a wing-span of up to 2.4 m. They are generally grey and are known for their distinctive energetic mating dance as well as their loud trumpeting "garooo" call. They are mostly found along the coast from Rockhampton to the Gulf of Carpentaria. They became the official bird emblem of Queensland in January 1986.

The red deer is a traditional beast of heraldry and was introduced into Queensland from the royal herds near London. Despite their position on the coat of arms, deer are a declared feral pest in Queensland with it being illegal to distribute, trade, release into the environment, move or feed any deer under the Biosecurity Act 2014.

=== Maltese Cross ===
The Maltese cross has a stranger history than the rest of the elements upon the arms. The Maltese Cross with a superimposed crown was sourced from the state badge, however it is not known how this badge was designed. One popular theory is that Queensland sought to associate itself with the newly issued Victoria Cross (which contains a Maltese Cross with the royal arms and a lion superimposed), first bestowed to Crimean War soldiers by Queen Victoria in 1857, a few years before Queensland became a separate colony in 1859. Another theory is that there was a connection between the Maltese Cross and Lady Bowen, wife of the first governor Sir George Bowen. Given that the Maltese Cross was not adopted until 1876, many years after the governor and his wife left in 1868, the former theory appears stronger.

== Gallery ==
Below is a visual evolution of Queensland's coat of arms.

Queensland's official coat of arms from 1893 to 1977

Queensland's official coat of arms since 1977
