= Coat of arms of New South Wales =

Versions
- State Badge of New South Wales
- Adopted: 11 October 1906
- Crest: On a wreath of the colours a rising sun each ray tagged with a flame of fire proper
- Torse: Argent and azure
- Shield: Azure a cross argent voided gules charged in the centre chief point with a lion passant guardant, and on each member with a mullet of eight points or between in the first and fourth quarters a fleece or banded argent and in the second and third quarters a garb also or
- Supporters: On the dexter side a lion rampant guardant and on the sinister side a kangaroo both or
- Motto: Orta Recens Quam Pura Nites "Newly risen, how brightly you shine"
- Designer: William Gullick

The coat of arms of New South Wales is the official coat of arms of the Australian state of New South Wales. It was granted by royal warrant of King Edward VII dated 11 October 1906.

== Description ==
The shield shows a blue (azure) field with a silver (argent) cross voided red (gules) with a gold (or) star on each arm of the red cross and a gold (or) lion in the centre known as the 'Lion in the South'. There is a golden fleece in the first and fourth quarters, and a wheat sheaf in the second and third quarters, both of these charges being gold (or), with the golden fleece having a band or ribbon around it coloured silver (argent).

The crest is a rising sun with each of the sun's rays tipped with a little reddish-orange flame, on a wreath or torse of blue (azure) and silver (argent).

The supporters are a golden (or) lion on the dexter (viewer's left) and a golden (or) kangaroo on the sinister (viewer's right). The supporters are usually depicted standing upon the motto ribbon as they hold the shield in an upright position.

The motto contains the Latin inscription "Orta recens quam pura nites" which, in English, means "Newly risen, how brightly you shine".

The official blazon, or heraldic description, is contained in the royal warrant, and reads:

Azure a cross argent voided gules charged in the centre chief point with a lion passant guardant, and on each member with a mullet of eight points or between in the first and fourth quarters a fleece or banded argent and in the second and third quarters a garb also or: And for a crest, on a wreath of the colours a rising sun each ray tagged with a flame of fire proper: And for the supporters, on the dexter side a lion rampant guardant: And on the sinister side a kangaroo both or, together with this motto, "Orta Recens Quam Pura Nites".

== Symbolism ==
The blue field and white cross are derived from the earliest Australian coats of arms which show the Southern Cross that is visible in the skies of the southern hemisphere. The designer of the Arms 'voided' the white cross by laying a red cross within it, representing the red cross of St George as used on the ensign of Britain's Royal Navy, and placing a golden, 8-pointed star on each arm of the cross. This symbolises the maritime origins of NSW, with seafarers relying upon the Southern Cross to navigate the seas, and the role of the navy in protecting the State.

The 'Lion in the South' is taken from the three golden lions on a red field on the arms of England, and symbolises both the sovereignty of NSW and the offspring of an old country. It represent the origins of the founders of the Colony of New South Wales as well as the independence of their succeeding generations.

The Golden Fleece contains several layers of allusion: the wealth of NSW derived from its pastoral industries, especially wool; ideas of honour and chivalry in the Order of the Golden Fleece, the origins of New South Wales' merino flocks being in a gift from the King of Spain, commander of the Order, to William III; and to the heroic search by Jason and the Argonauts in their quest for the golden fleece.

The wheatsheaf, or garb, also contains several layers of allusion: to the agricultural wealth of New South Wales, especially wheat growing; and to the convicts, many of whom, through their toil in producing food for the early colony, were rewarded with grants of land upon which they established the farms and rural landscapes of eastern New South Wales. These allusions were clear to educated men and women at the time, and those with an interest in the political economy of New South Wales at the turn of the 20th century.

The rising sun in the crest has been used in the heraldry of New South Wales since the 1820s, essentially to symbolise hope in the future. It also depicts the geographical position of New South Wales, which faces the sun rising every morning over the Pacific Ocean. The blue and white wreath or torse shows the two principal colours in the shield, which are often used as the sporting colours for New South Wales, although there is much variation in the shade of the blue in common use.

Of the two supporters, the lion symbolises the origins of many of the people of New South Wales in the early 20th century in the British Isles. The designer particularly stressed that this was not an English nor Scottish nor Irish nor Welsh lion, but British, to represent the coming together of many different people in a new land and forming a new people. The kangaroo has been used as a supporter in popular New South Wales heraldic practice since 1806, although this is its earliest official use. It symbolises the land and natural resources or the Australian identity of the state.

The motto was first devised in 1879 for the International Exposition held in Sydney, and was adopted as the State motto in 1906 to clearly replace an older motto on official seals that referred to the State's convict origins. This motto reinforced the positive symbolism of the Arms with its message of hope in the future.

== Designer ==
The Coat of Arms was designed by the NSW Government Printer, William Applegate Gullick, who had arrived in the colony as an infant with his parents. His father worked in the printing industry, and Gullick later served an apprenticeship in the printing trades with John Sands & Co, the colony's leading printers and stationers. He was appointed Government Printer in 1896, and was responsible for New South Wales postage stamp designs until 1913. Gullick was commissioned by Premier Carruthers in 1905 to design the Arms, and after some negotiation with the College of Arms in London he produced the design that was finally granted by the King. Gullick also had a role in the design of the Australian Coat of Arms.

== Legal status and use ==
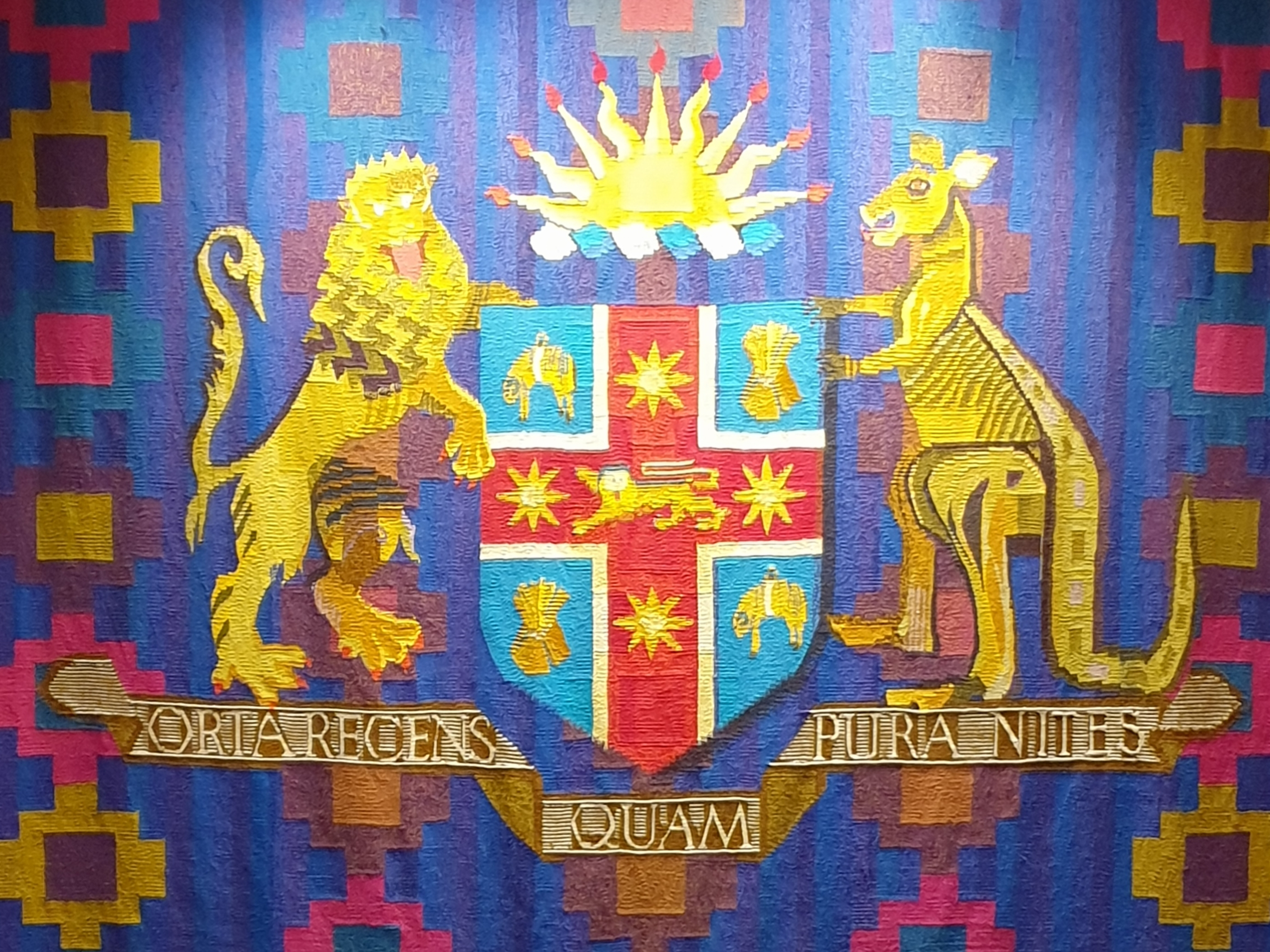
Embroidered coat of arms on display at Parliament House, Sydney.

The State Arms are described in section 4(4) of the State Arms, Symbols and Emblems Act 2004 (see below) as the Arms of Dominion and Sovereignty of the State. Arms of Dominion and Sovereignty are the symbols of intangible public authority which belong to independent states and are used by their representatives (such as government agencies) and leaders.

The royal warrant granting the Arms states that they are "for the greater honour and distinction of Our State of New South Wales ... to be borne by the said State on Seals, Shields, Banners, Flags and otherwise according to the Laws of Arms." These laws are derived from medieval English civil law, and relate to the authority to grant Arms, and the regulation of their use, although the enforceability of these laws in New South Wales is unclear.

The publication of the royal warrant in the NSW Government Gazette on 22 February 1907 confirmed their status as the official Arms of the State of New South Wales. The making of unauthorised copies of the Arms was prohibited by section 3 of the Unauthorised Documents Act 1922, and this remained the only piece of heraldic legislation in New South Wales until 2004. Although the State government made various attempts to use the Arms in a uniform manner, and despite the clear direction in the royal warrant about their use, there was wide variation in their use and uncertainty about their status. This was most notable in the courts, where the Royal Arms continued to be used to show the separation of executive and judicial powers.

In 2003, the NSW Parliament passed the State Arms, Symbols and Emblems Act 2004, which patriated the Law of Arms to some degree regarding the Arms of the State. The Act definitively established the NSW Coat of Arms, to be known as the State Arms, as the Arms of the State of New South Wales, and required the use of the Arms wherever the authority of the State of New South Wales, or of the Crown in Right of NSW, is being represented. The Royal Arms, henceforth to be known as the UK Royal Arms, are no longer to be used for this purpose, and there was subsequently a programme of replacing the UK Royal Arms with the State Arms in public buildings, places, seals and documents. The Act provides an exemption from such replacement when a representation of the UK Royal Arms (such as a stone carving of the facade of a courthouse) is considered by the Heritage Council of NSW to contribute to the cultural significance of a heritage listed building.

In 2024, the official version of the arms used by the NSW Government was updated. The new design can be more easily digitally scaled without distortion.

== Future developments ==
The State Arms, Symbols and Emblems Act specifically provides for the Arms to be further 'ornamented', and it is possible that 'ornamented' versions of the State Arms could be prepared in the future to reflect the separation of executive, judicial and legislative functions, reminiscent of the manner in which the UK Royal Arms were used by the courts prior to 2004.

== See also ==
- Flag of New South Wales
- Government of New South Wales
- Coat of arms of Sydney
- Australian heraldry

== Bibliography ==
- Gullick, William (1907). The New South Wales Coat of Arms: With Notes on the Earlier Seals. Sydney: self-published – via Trove.
- Gullick, William (1914). The Seals of New South Wales – via Trove.
- Legislative Council, Report on the Proposed State Arms Bill, NSW Parliament, Legislative Council Standing Committee on Law and Justice, Report 23, Sydney December 2002.
- 'Royal Warrant Granting Armorial Ensigns and Supporters for the State of NSW', Government Gazette, Supplement, Sydney 22 February 1907: 1345-1346.
