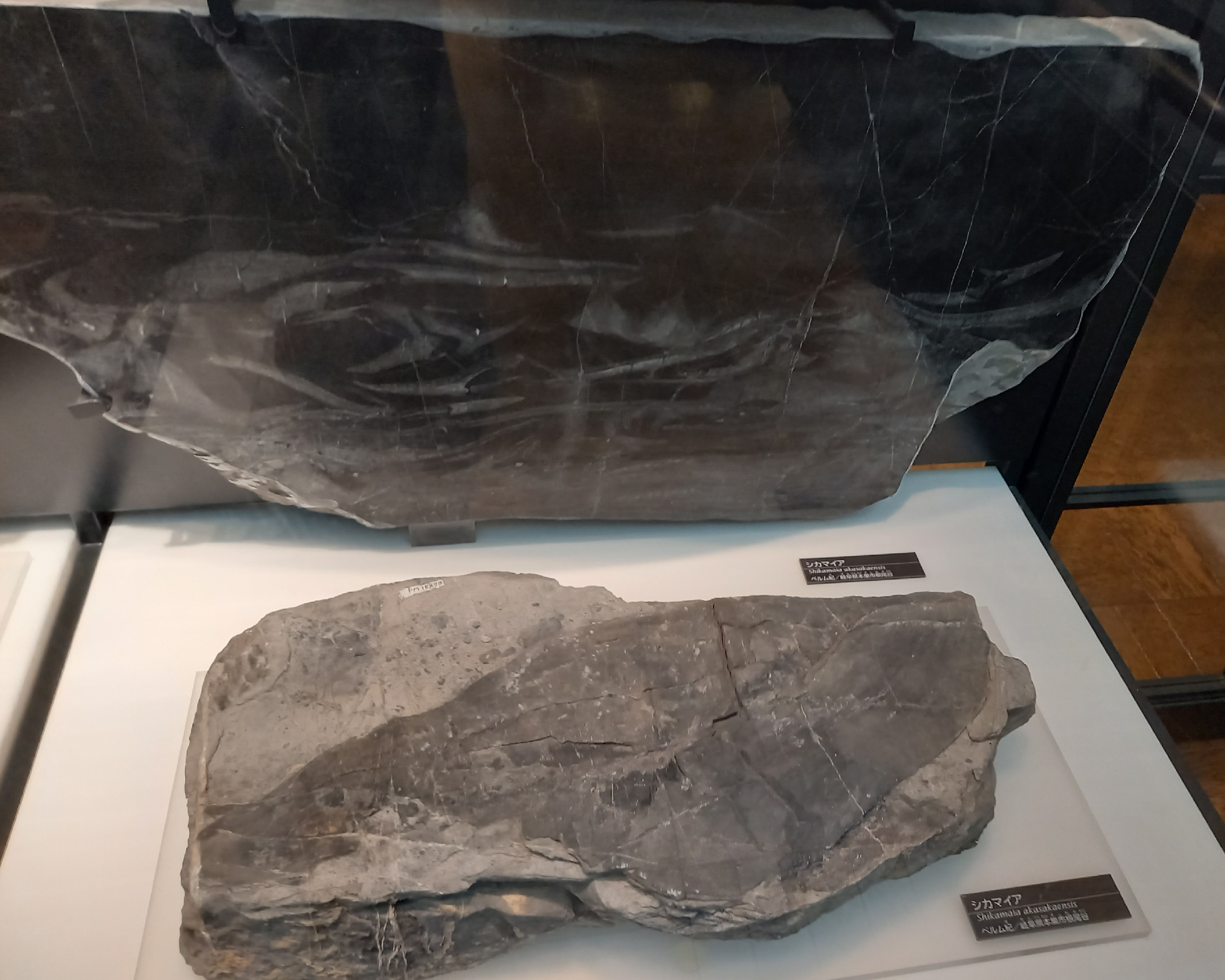
- Fossils of Shikamaia ozakii
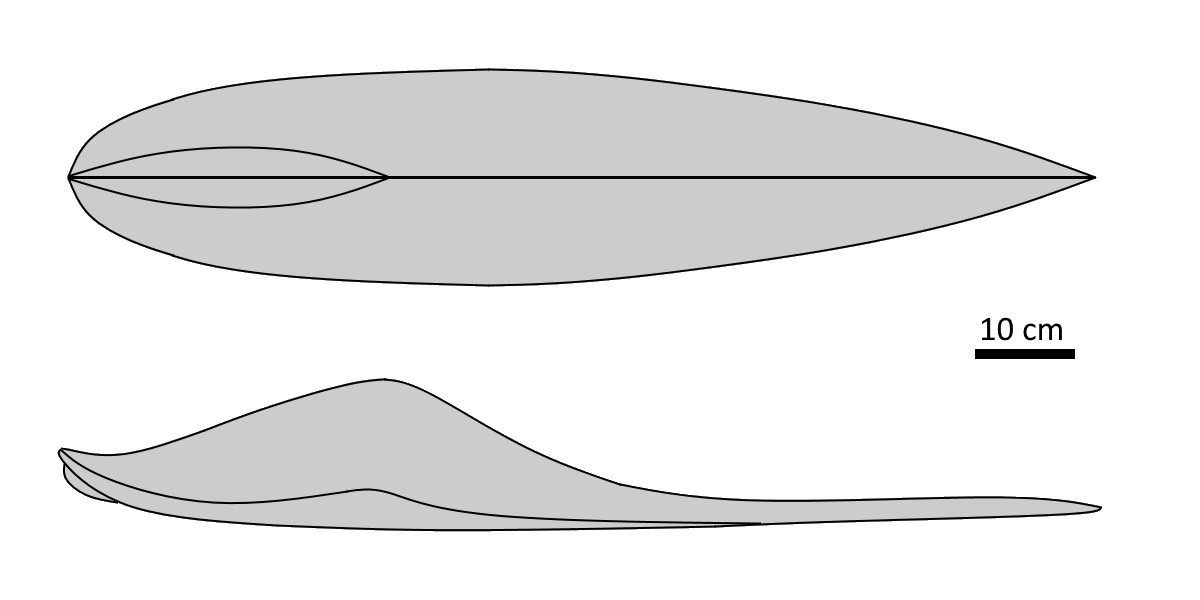
- Diagrammatic reconstruction of Shikamaia akasakaensis

Scientific classification
- Kingdom: Animalia
- Phylum: Mollusca
- Class: Bivalvia
- Order: Pteriida
- Superfamily: †Ambonychioidea
- Family: †Alatoconchidae; Termier et al., 1973

Genera
- Alatoconcha Termier et al., 1973; Dereconcha Yancey and Boyd, 1983; Saikraconcha Yancey and Boyd, 1983; Shikamaia Ozaki, 1968 (=Tanchintongia Runnegar and Gobbett, 1975)

= Alatoconchidae =

Alatoconchidae Temporal range: Artinskian – Capitanian 290.1–259.5 Ma

Extinct family of molluscs

Alatoconchidae is an extinct family of prehistoric bivalves that lived in the early to middle Permian period. Genera belonging to Alatoconchidae are characterized by their shell that is strongly compressed in the dorsoventral direction. Some species reached large sizes of as much as 1 metre (3.3 ft) long. It is hypothesized that some species in this family got energy from chemosynthetic bacteria.

== Occurrence ==
Fossil records of Alatoconchidae are known from the early to middle Permian. They are found in shallow marine carbonates across widely separated areas, such as Croatia, Tunisia, Oman, Afghanistan, Iran, Thailand, Malaysia, Philippines, Japan, Alaska and South China.

== History ==
In 1968, Shikamaia akasakaensis from Japan, named after palaeontologist Shikama Tokio, is described, but due to its unique shape and fragmentary fossil preservation, it was originally classified as Animalia incertae sedis. The Alatoconchidae family was created in 1973, and included genus Alatoconcha.

== Morphology ==
According to form of Shikamaia perakensis, the shell is compressed in the dorsal ventral direction, and is elongated in the anterior-posterior direction. The posterior half of the shell consists only of the wing-like flat flanges, which have a very compressed cross-section. Its anatomical feature is close to modern cardiid, like Corculum cardissa.

== Paleoecology ==
It is theorized that one genus in this family, Shikamaia, formed symbiotic relationships with photosynthetic or chemosynthetic microbes for sustenance, like modern Corculum cardissa. It was originally believed to have a translucent shell layer, and that their optimal depth was in the lower part of the euphotic zone; this zone is suitable for algae, so association with photosynthetic microbes is supported. However, later studies showed that shell of Shikamaia was opaque, rejecting the previous hypothesis. Alatoconchids are known from the oily and odorous black wackestone and the lime mudstone facies. It suggests that Shikamaia possibly pumped up seawater that contain hydrogen sulfide from deeper sediment layers to nourish chemosynthetic bacteria within the animal's soft tissue, like modern lucinid bivalve.

The growth pattern of Shikamaia akasakaensis is known: as they grow, they develop an elongated posterior shell to increase body cavity.

== Extinction ==
Alatoconchids went extinct in the end of Guadalupian period, probably due to Capitanian mass extinction event, being one of the more notable bivalve extinctions caused by this event. This event caused drastic fluctuation of seawater temperature, sudden ocean acidification, and marine anoxia. Based on the theory that they had symbiosis with photosynthetic microbes, temporary temperature drop of seawater (in the Kamura event) killed the photosynthetic microbes, which compromised the photosymbiotic systems and caused extinction. However, later study questioned that theory, because it is unclear whether the Kamura event actually happened, for example climatic cooling inconsistent with the conodont apatite oxygen isotope records. Still the drastic fluctuation of seawater temperature in the interval from the latest Guadalupian to the earliest Lopingian was probably enough to kill alatoconchids. Ocean acidification and decrease in carbonate saturation, hypoxic condition in seawater are also considered as reason of extinction of alatoconchids.
