= Coat of arms of Brisbane =

Australian coat of arms

Coat of arms of the City of Brisbane
- Adopted: 1925
- Crest: Issuant from a mural crown Gules a leopard's head proper between two palm leaves proper.
- Shield: Caducei, Stafford Knots, two White Stars
- Supporters: Two gryphons Or armed Sable.
- Compartment: A mount Vert.
- Motto: Latin: Meliora Sequimur ('we aim for the best')

The coat of arms of Brisbane is the official coat of arms of the city of Brisbane. It was first adopted in 1925 and draws much of its symbology from Sir Thomas Brisbane, for whom Brisbane was named.

== Description ==
Sir Thomas' preoccupation with the field of astronomy is indicated by the two mullets. The Stafford knot was the badge of the 38th (1st Staffordshire) Regiment of Foot in which Sir Thomas Brisbane entered the British Army as an ensign in 1789.

The Caduceus is the symbol of Commerce and Peace, and is the emblem depicted for Hermes in his capacity as God and Protector of Commerce.

Two Gryphons support the design, together with the motto Meliora Sequimur, which means 'we aim for the best' in Latin. The Gryphon is one of the principal bearings in heraldry, and is frequently used as a charge or supporter. The chimerical creature is half eagle and half lion and legend states that when it attains full growth, it will never be taken alive. The wavy blue bar around the creatures' necks alludes to the city's location as a port on the river.

The palm leaves in the crest are a symbol of victory included as a compliment from the Council to the valour of Australian Defence Force.

Valour, honour and high-mettled attributes are conveyed by the leopard in the crest. The colours of the city, blue and gold, are indicated by the top wreath.

== Blazon ==
The blazon (heraldic description) is as follows:

The Arms are described as —"Barry wavy of six Argent and Azure a Caduceus Or on a Chief nebuly of the second a Stafford Knot of a third between two Mullets of the first. And for the Crest On a wreath Or and Azure Out of Mural Crown Gules a Leopard's head couped Or between two Palm branches slipped Vert" and the supporters as "On either side a Gryphon proper charged on the neck with a Bar wavy Azure[.]" The Grant of Arms authorises them "to be borne and used forever hereafter by the City of Brisbane on Seals, Shields or otherwise according to the Law of Arms".

== See also ==
- Flag of Brisbane
- Coat of arms of Queensland
- Australian heraldry
