= Flag of Brisbane =

Flag

City of Brisbane
- Proportion: 1:2

The flag of Brisbane is based upon the arms of the Australian City of Brisbane. The two primary colours used are blue and gold, with blue representing the sea and the Brisbane River which flows through the city, and gold representing the sun and the city's warm climate.

== Symbols on the flag ==
The white, wavy lines in three of the six quarters of the flag may represent the river, which brought much commerce and prosperity to the city in the early days of British settlement. An alternative explanation is that the wavy lines represent white clouds, parting to allow the blue sky to be seen behind them. The three caducei in these sections, rather than their popular but erroneous association with medicine, again represent commerce, referencing the role of Hermes in Greek mythology in his capacity as the protector of commerce and trade. The remaining three quarters each depict two Stafford knots and a star, with the stars representing the achievements in astronomy of Sir Thomas Brisbane, for whom the city is named, and the knots representing the 38th Foot (Staffordshire Regiment), which Brisbane served in prior to being named governor of the colony of New South Wales. The abundance of maritime symbols on the flag reflects Brisbane's early role as a river port.

== Usage ==
The flag is flown daily outside of Brisbane City Hall, and is also prominently displayed both inside the main city hall, as well as in other council offices throughout the city. A giant image of the flag was also projected onto the William Jolly Bridge in Brisbane as a part of Queensland's 150th anniversary celebrations.

== See also ==
- Coat of arms of Brisbane
- List of Australian flags
