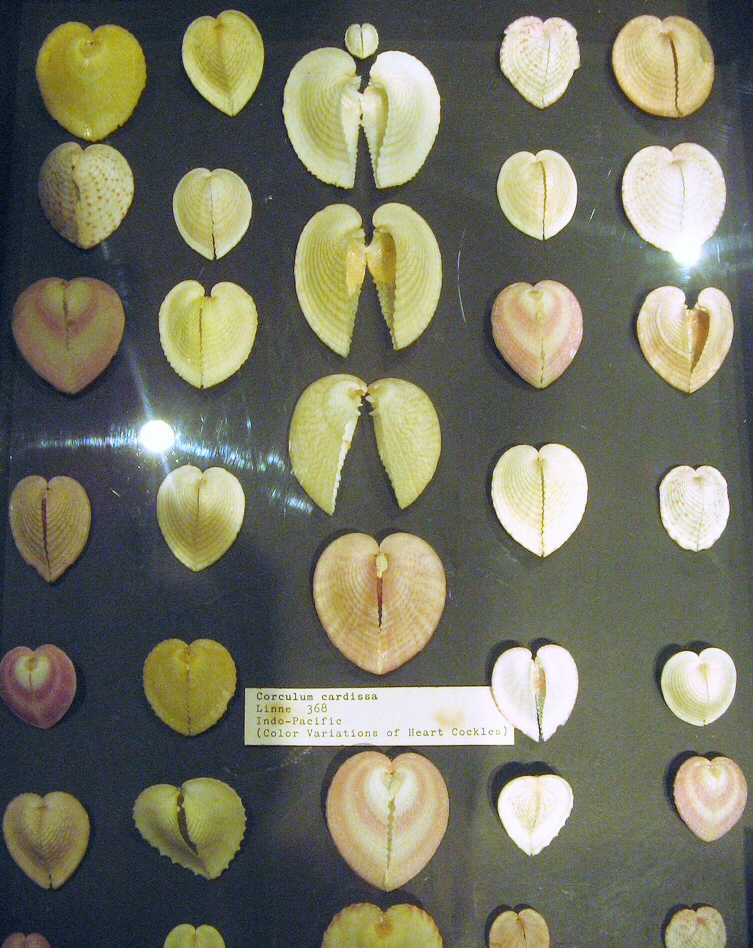
- Corculum cardissa

Scientific classification
- Kingdom: Animalia
- Phylum: Mollusca
- Class: Bivalvia
- Order: Cardiida
- Family: Cardiidae
- Genus: Corculum; Röding, 1798

Species
- 7 species (see text)

= Corculum =

Genus of bivalves

Corculum is a genus of small saltwater clams, marine bivalve molluscs in the family Cardiidae, the cockles. They maintain Symbiodinium dinoflagellates as symbionts.

== Species ==
Species in the genus Corculum are:

- Corculum aequale (Deshayes, 1855)
- Corculum aselae Bartsch, 1947
- Corculum cardissa (Linnaeus, 1758)
- Corculum impressum (Lightfoot, 1786)
- Corculum lorenzi M. Huber, 2013
- Corculum monstrosum (Gmelin, 1791)
- Corculum roseum (Gmelin, 1791)
