= Helmet (heraldry) =

Heraldic device

In heraldic achievements, the helmet or helm is situated above the shield and bears the torse and crest. The style of helmet displayed varies according to rank and social status, and these styles developed over time, in step with the development of actual military helmets. In some traditions, especially German and Nordic heraldry, two or three helmets (and sometimes more) may be used in a single achievement of arms, each representing a fief to which the bearer has a right. For this reason, the helmets and crests in German and Nordic arms are considered essential to the coat of arms and are never separated from it.

Open-visored or barred helmets are typically reserved for the highest ranks of nobility, while lesser nobility and burghers typically assume closed helms. While these classifications remained relatively constant, the specific forms of all these helmets varied and evolved over time.

In ecclesiastical heraldry, bishops and other clergy use a mitre or another rank-appropriate ecclesiastical hat in place of a helmet.

== History ==
Crown-headed helmet in the coat of arms of Tallinn, the capital city of Estonia.

The evolution of heraldic helmet shape followed the evolution of helmet design, especially jousting helmets, from the 14th to 16th centuries. The armorials of the second half of the 13th century do not include helmets. Helmets are shown as an integral part of coats in the first half of the 14th century (Codex Manesse, Zürich armorial). These helmets are still of the "great helm" type, without a movable visor. Heraldic helmets became diversified with the development of dedicated jousting armor during the 15th and 16th centuries. Jousting was abandoned as a courtly practice in the early years of the 17th century, and since then the various types of heraldic helmets are purely driven by convention, and no longer tied to improvements or fashions in armoury.

The practice of indicating rank through the display of barred or open-face helmets appears around 1615. As jousting with lances was supplanted by tourneying with maces, the object being to knock the opponent's crest off his helmet, the fully enclosed helmet gave way to helmets with enlarged visual openings with only a few bars to protect the face. These barred helmets were restricted by the imperial chancellery in Vienna to the nobility and certain doctors of law or theology, while the jousting helm was freely adopted by anyone.

The direction a helmet faces and the number of bars on the grille has been ascribed special significance in later manuals, but this is not a period practice. A king's helmet, a golden helmet shown affronté with the visor raised, crowned with a royal crown, became adopted by the kings of Prussia.

The helmet was not specifically granted in an achievement of arms, but was naturally assumed by appropriate rank as a matter of "inherent right", so a helmet with torse and mantling would not be misplaced even above a shield which had no crest to place above it. When multiple crests need to be depicted, the convention in English heraldry is to draw the crests above a single helmet, each being separated from it, while in German heraldry, where multiple crests appear frequently after the 16th century, each crest is always treated as inseparable from its own helmet and turned in agreement with the helmet.

In continental Europe, multiple helmets were usually turned inward, with the center helm (if an odd number) turned affronté; while in Scandinavian heraldry the helmets were usually turned outward. Heraldic combinations were driven to extremes in the 18th century, e.g. the arms of the last margraves of Brandenburg-Ansbach (Charles Alexander, Margrave of Brandenburg-Ansbach, r. 1737–1791) consist of a shield with 21 quarterings topped with a record thirteen helmets and crests.

== By traditions ==
=== General ===
Open or barred helmet, reserved for members of the nobility

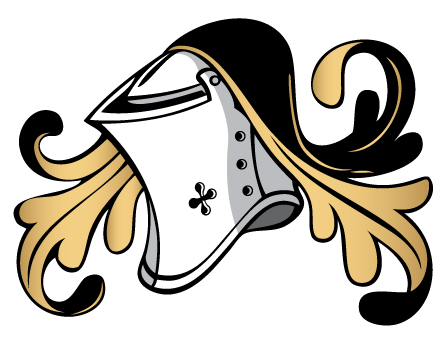
Closed or tilting helm, used by medieval knights, also adopted by English esquires and gentlemen, as well as on burgher arms

=== United Kingdom ===
The usage of heraldic helmets in Britain is as follows: gold helmet with bars for the royal family; silver helmet with gold bars for peers; steel helmet with gold bars for the non-peerage Scottish feudal baron; open steel helmet shown affronté for knights and baronets; steel tournament helm for Scottish clan chiefs; closed steel helmet for esquires and gentlemen.

Monarch and family

Peer

Baronet or Knight

Esquire or Gentleman

=== France ===
The French heraldic tradition for helmets also attempted in the later period to standardize the shape of the helmet depending on the rank, with for instance helmets turned to the left (i.e., pointing to the right) for bastards, or open golden helmets for kings and emperors (the sovereign must see and know everything).

=== Poland ===
In Polish heraldry, the helmet was for a long time an essential and indispensable element of a noble coat of arms. The helmet, much like other elements of knightly armor, evolved over time. Consequently, 13th and 14th century coats of arms feature great helmets and bucket helmets, which covered the knight's entire head and featured narrow, horizontal eye slits.

In the 15th century, the tournament helmet appeared. In the following century, the barred helmet was introduced, which is also frequently referred to as a tournament helmet. This latter form is the most common in late Polish heraldry.

It was not until the 17th century that representations of the shield alone with a crown and crest became more frequent.

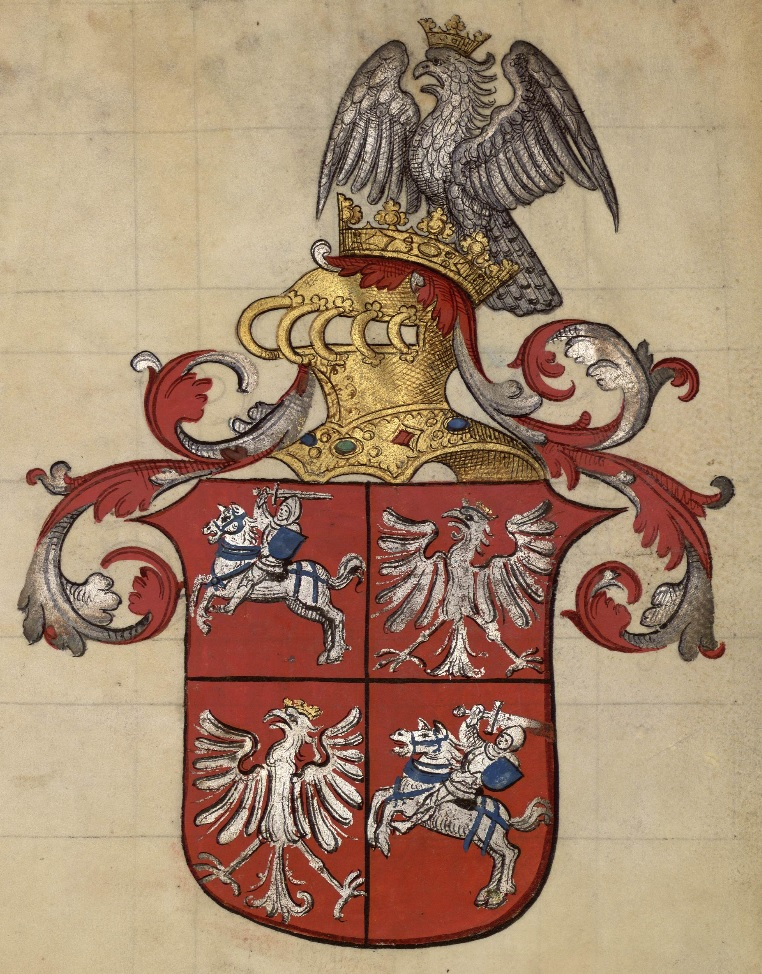
Coat of arms of the Polish–Lithuanian Commonwealth, 1574.

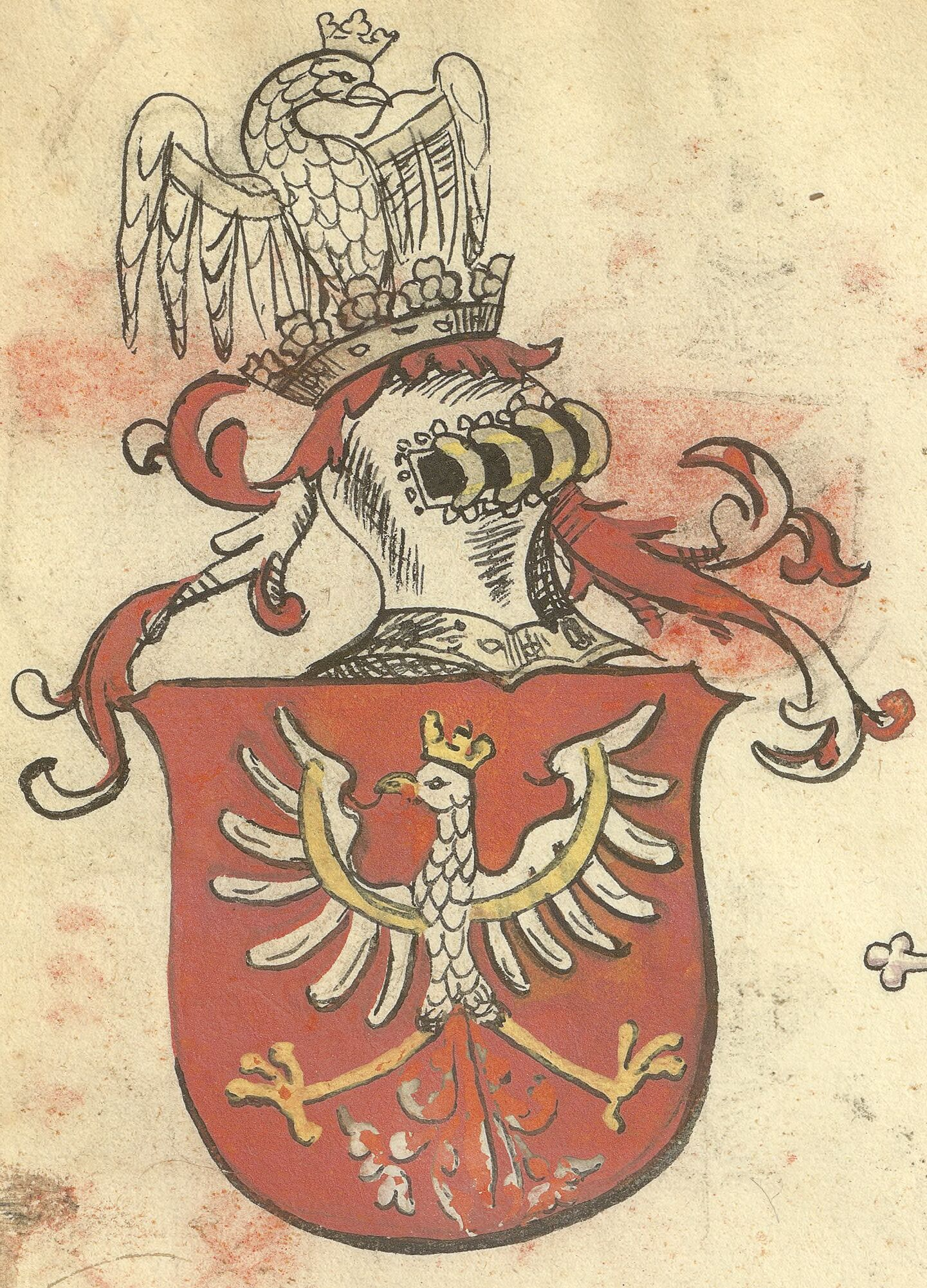
Coat of arms of Poland, 1601.

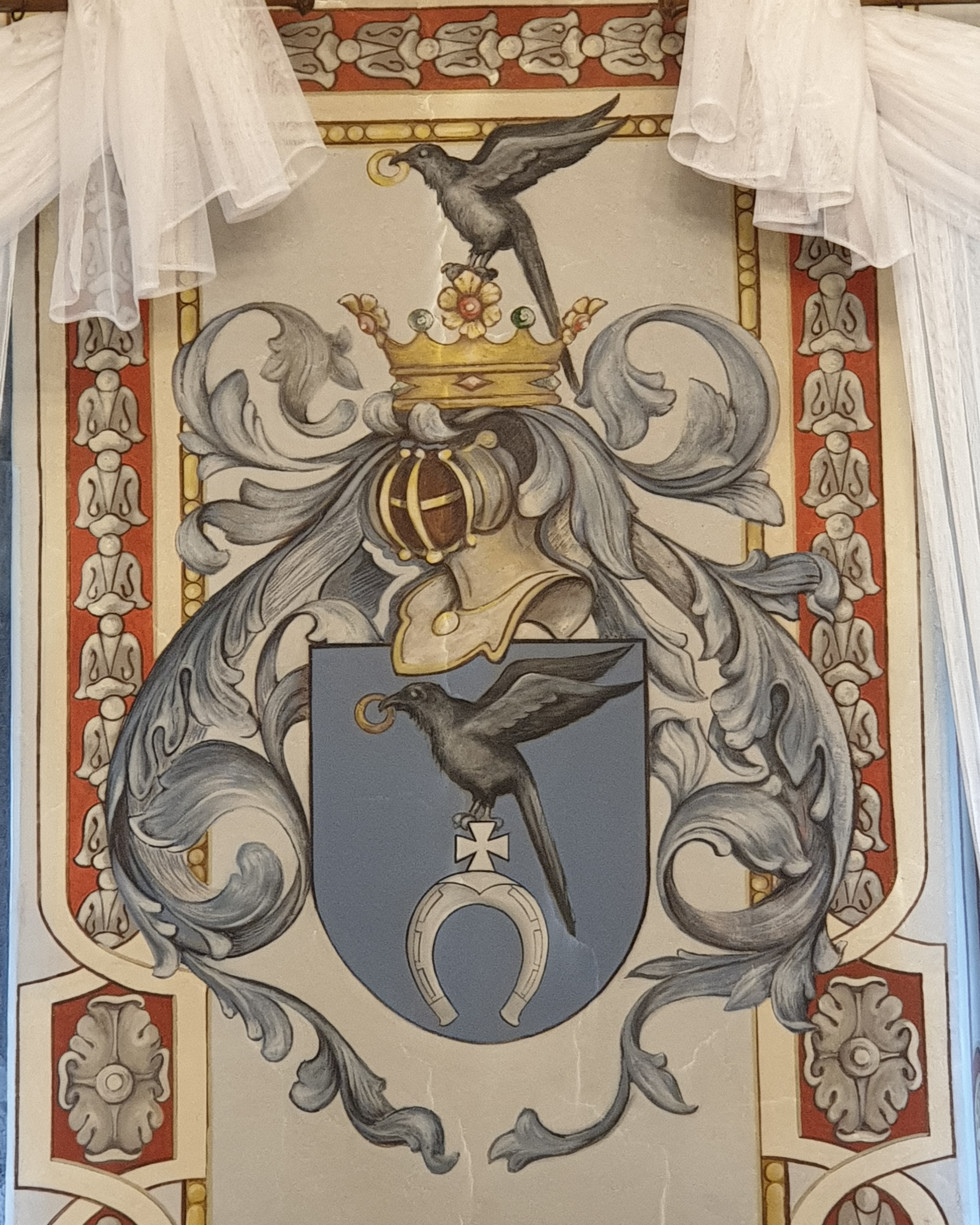
Coat of arms of Ślepowron, 1702.

=== Russia ===
The norms of Russian heraldry regarding helmets diverge greatly from the Western European tradition. Alongside the traditional Western open helmet (silver with gold details for titled nobility, steel with gold details for everyone else), as well as the closed helmet sometimes granted by the state, "ethnic" helmets were also in use, not found anywhere else. From the 19th century onwards, ancient Russian families began to use the yerikhonka, the "cap of Jericho", a medieval conical Slavic helmet similar to the Middle Eastern shishak. These followed their own color system, not corresponding with the use of tinctures for Western helmets: non-titled nobles would use a steel yerikhonka with silver details, barons and counts steel with golden details, knyaz families silver with golden details. The House of Romanov itself used a unique yerikhonka called the helmet of Alexander Nevsky, based on the royal helmet of Michael I (once mistakenly believed to have belonged to Alexander Nevsky, hence the name). Asian noble families non-Slavic origin who were integrated in the Empire were also allowed an ethnic helmet, usually a misyurka, similar to the yerikhonka in shape but rounder and with an obtuse tip.

In the modern Russian Federation, while private heraldry remains officially unregulated, both Western and ethnic helmets (called sheloms in modern Russian heraldic language) are considered acceptable by prominent heraldists such as Mikhail Medvedev and Dmitry Ivanov, but only in their simplest forms, and stripped of any details that may be perceived as symbols of nobility. For Western helmets, this means using commoner kettle hats as opposed to the more aristocratic open and close helmets, while sheloms are to be used without nasal bars, cheekpieces, or neck guards, which were sometimes found on older "ethnic" helmets. On the other hand, a commoner helmet may be complemented with a mail coif below. All colors except for steel are forbidden, with the exception of the lining, for which other tinctures may be used (purpure is recommended). However, none of these restrictions apply to direct descendants of old Russian aristocracy, who can use the same helmets as their ancestors alongside the rest of their family arms.

Both in Imperial and republican Russian heraldry, the direction of the helmet plays no role: whether the helmet is portrayed affronty or turned to the right depends on the shape of the crest.

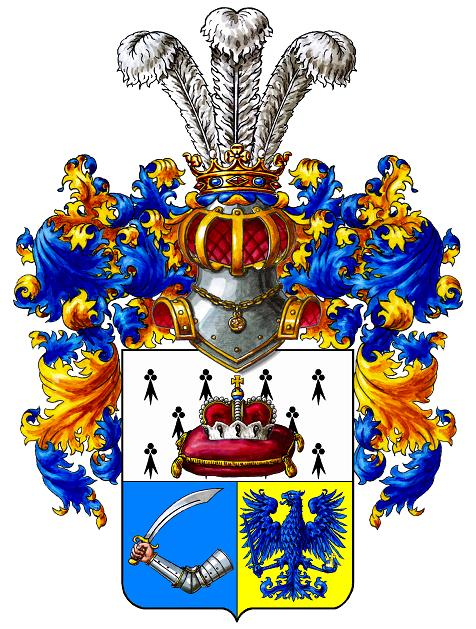
Open Western helmet: coat of arms of the Pushkin family.

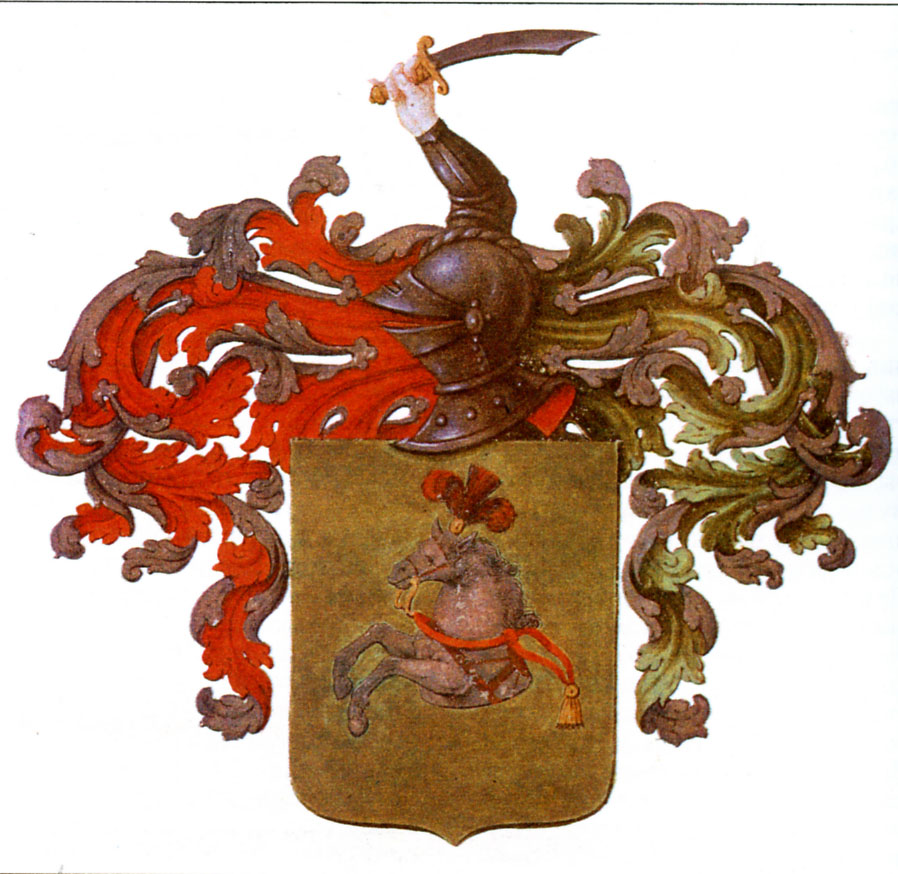
Closed Western helmet: coat of arms of the Skornyakov family.

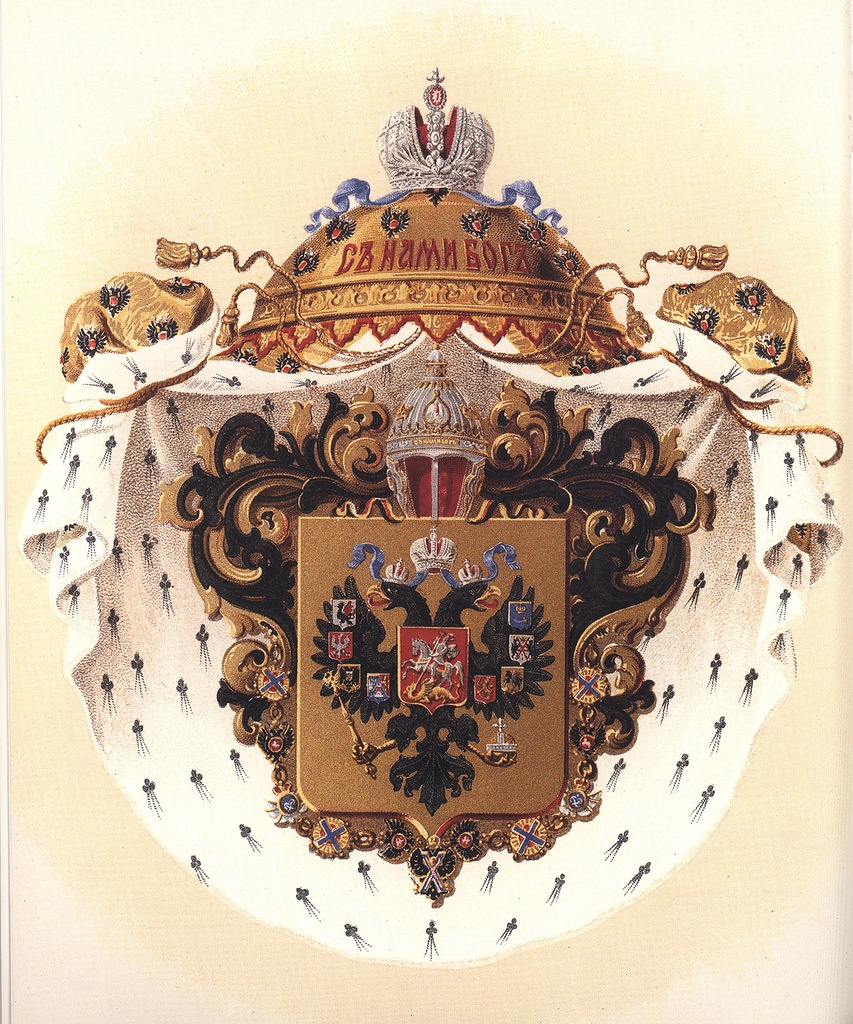
Aristocratic yerikhonka: lesser coat of arms of the Russian Empire.

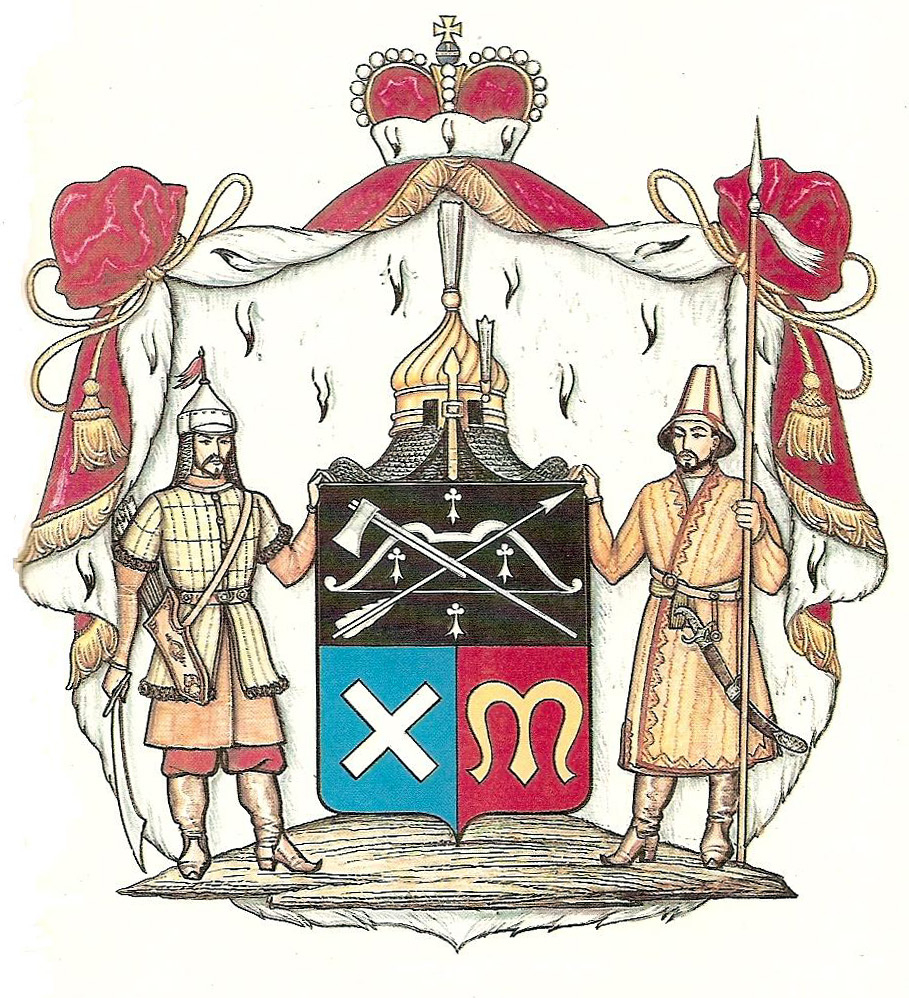
Aristocratic misyurka: coat of arms of the Kazakh Chingis family.

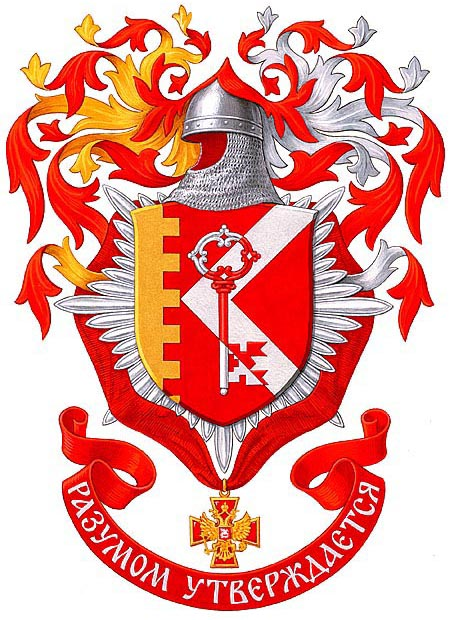
Commoner ethnic helmet: coat of arms of Vladimir Kopelev, knight of the For Merit to the Fatherland order.

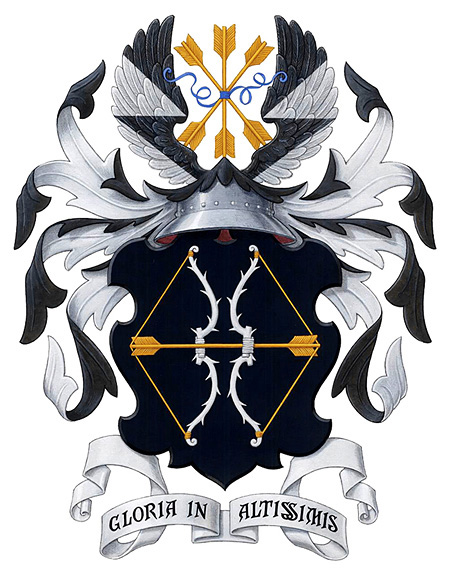
Commoner Western helmet: coat of arms of Nikolai Likhachev, citizen of Peterhof.

=== Canada ===
In Canadian heraldry, helmets play a little role and are not blazoned; therefore, the armiger can display their helm in whatever style they choose. One notable example of a non-traditional helmet used in Canadian heraldry is the arms of Julie Payette, a former governor general of Canada, which bears an astronaut's helmet as the helm. Other examples include nasal helmets, Corinthian helmets, parka hoods, and United Nations peacekeeping helmets.

The armorial achievement of Julie Payette notably features an astronaut helmet, which would be considered nontraditional in most other heraldic traditions.

=== Belgium ===
In Belgian heraldry, barred helms are most commonly used, and are not reserved for the nobility like in some jurisdictions. They most often have gold bars, as well as a gold collar and trim. They are often lined and attached.

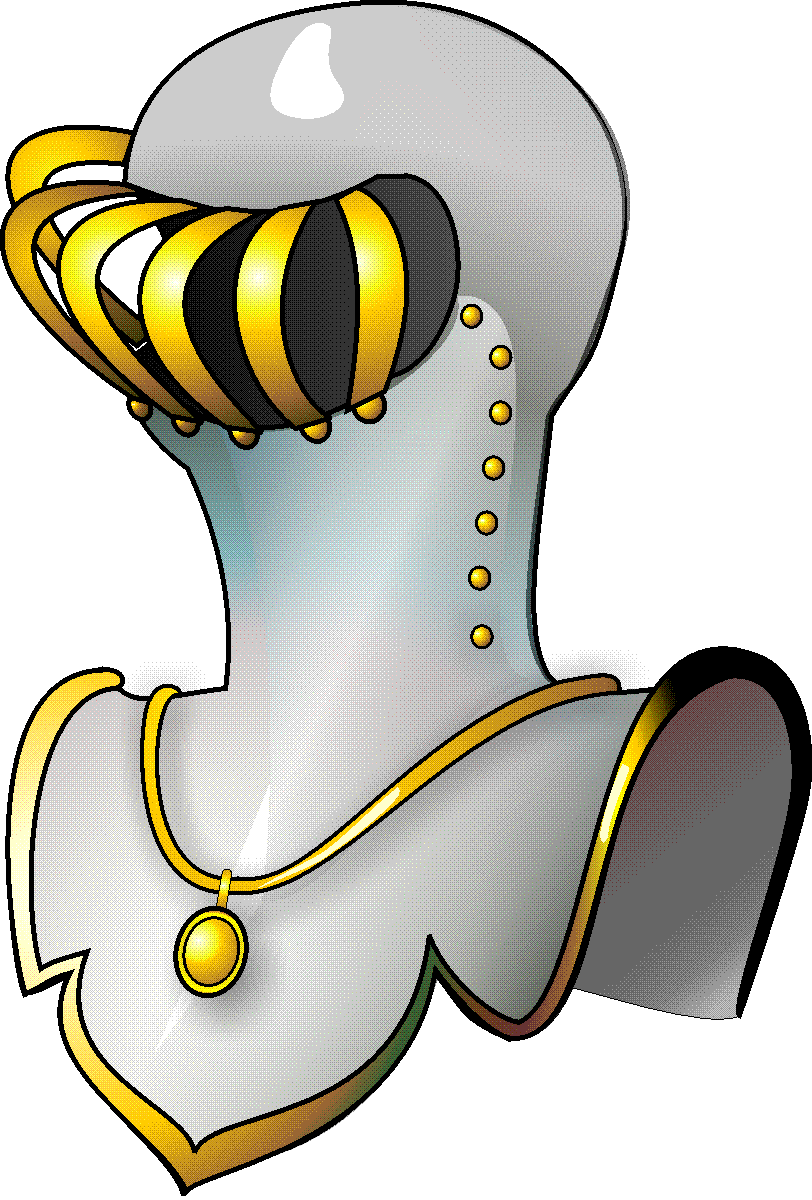
Barred helm with gold bars, collar, and trim.

All silver barred helm.

Jousting or tourney helms are sometimes also used, but are rarer. They are the only alternative accepted by the Council of Heraldry and Vexillology to the barred helmet.

=== Ecclesiastical ===
In the Roman Catholic Church, clerics entitled to a coat of arms use a galero instead of a helmet, which is considered too belligerent for men in holy orders.

Galero gules with fifteen tassels per side, used by cardinals in place of a helmet (and patriarchal cross)

Galero vert with ten tassels per side, used by archbishops in place of a helmet (and patriarchal cross)

Galero vert with six tassels per side, used by bishops in place of a helmet (and single-barred cross)

Galero sable with one tassel per side (and blank shield), used by armigerous priests in place of a helmet

In the same way, clerics of the Anglican Communion entitled to a coat of arms use a similar black hat in place of a helmet.

Hat sable with cords purpure and three tassels per side, used by Anglican archdeacons in place of a helmet

Hat sable with cords purpure and three tassels gules per side, used by Anglican deans in place of a helmet

Hat sable with three tassels gules per side, used by Anglican canons in place of a helmet

Hat sable with cords sable and argent and one tassel sable per side, used by Anglican priests in place of a helmet
