= William Gullick =

Australian publisher (1858–1922)

William Applegate Gullick
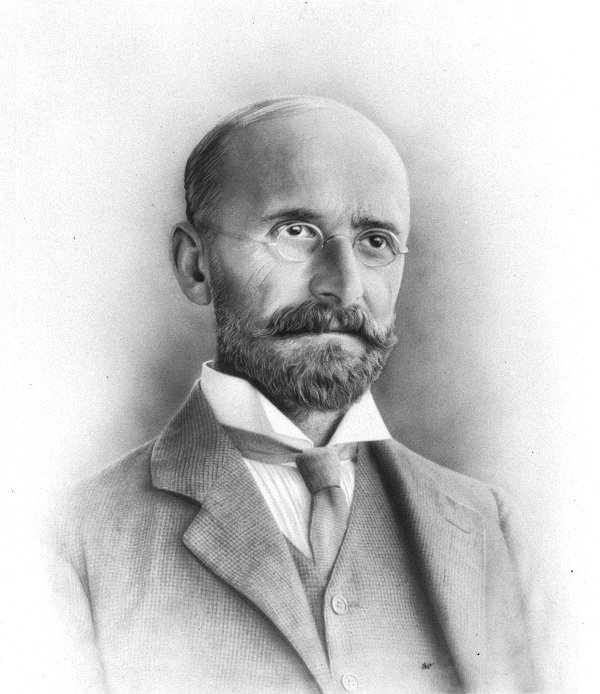
- Born: 1858; Edington, Wiltshire
- Died: April 1922 (aged 63–64)
- Occupation: Printer
- Spouse: Mary Pierce
- Children: five

William Applegate Gullick (1858 – April 1922) was a publisher and inspector of stamps in New South Wales, Australia. He was an early photographer and designed the coat of arms of New South Wales.

== Biography ==
William Applegate Gullick was baptised in Edington, Wiltshire 0n 19 September 1858. He and his family emigrated to Sydney where his mother died in childbirth. His father, William Ransome Gullick, was a printer and bookseller, who lost all his money after he had married Sarah Dust, and was declared bankrupt in 1869.

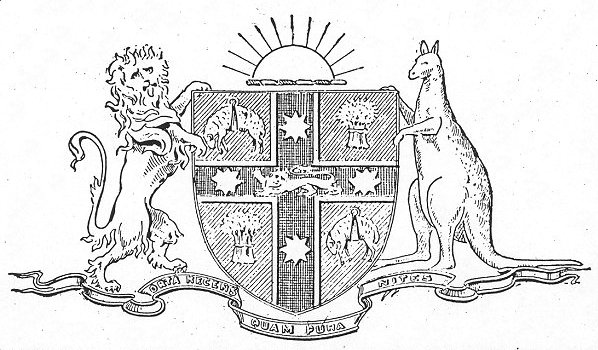
The coat of arms for New South Wales as published in March 1906 after it was approved by Joseph Carruthers, the Premier of NSW.

Gullick started his printing career working for the trusted printing company of John Sands and Co. This company published directories and also worked on heraldry. This organisation published the directory of deaths. He married Mary Pierce; William and Mary had five children, whom they named Chloe, Zoe, Marjorie, Dorothy and Noel.

Gullick was asked to create the coat of arms for New South Wales. The interpretation of the ideas that he had were published in 1907 and later a book on the seals in 1914. He was honoured to have his designs approved by the King, and Gullick expected these "emblems of distinction to be prized and guarded jealously". The motto of the arms had originally been devised for Sydney University, but it was Gullick who decided that his arms would bear the message “Orta recens quam pura nites” (Newly risen, how brightly you shine).

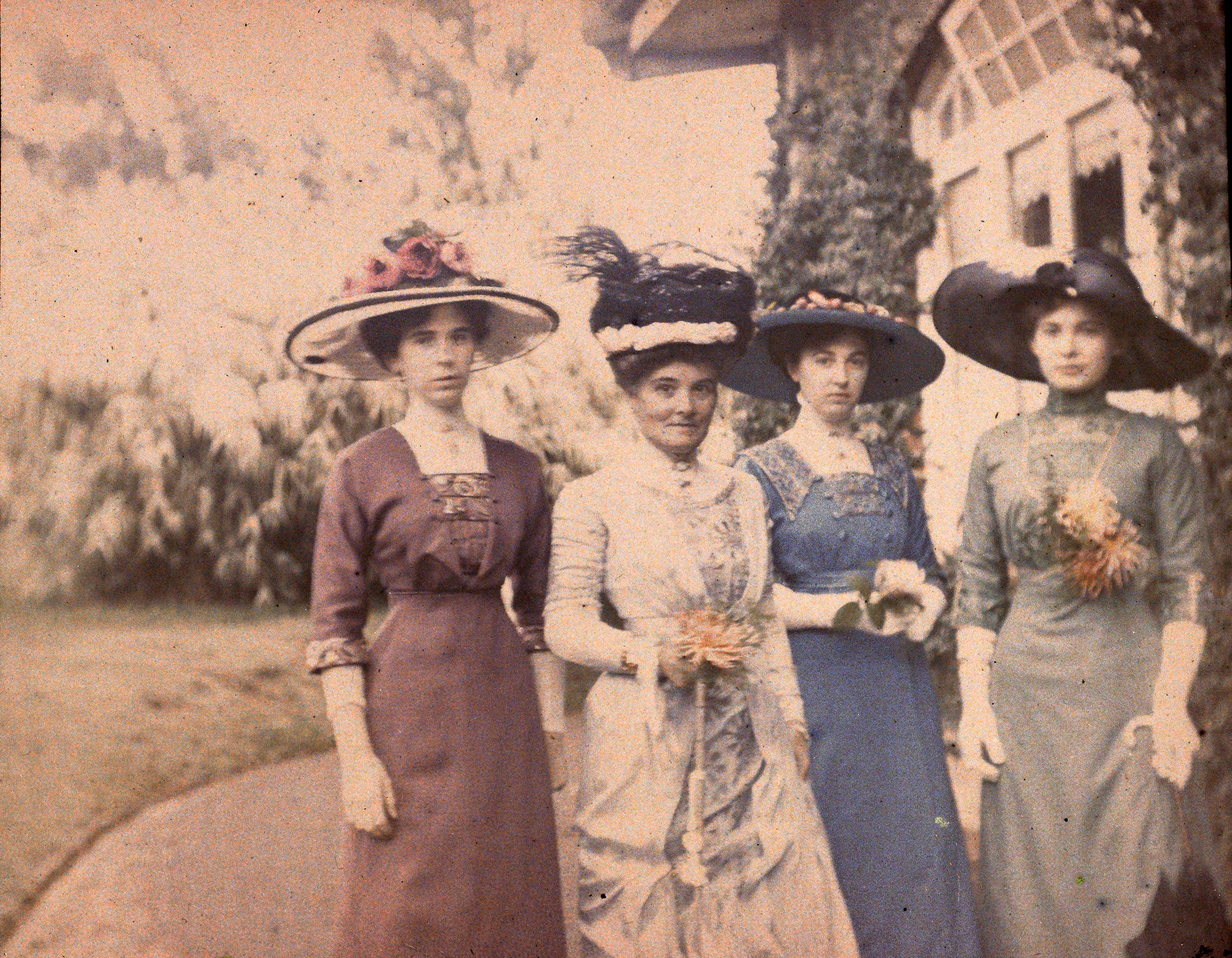
Mary Gullick, Zoe Gullick, Marjory Gullick and Chloe Gullick in an early colour picture

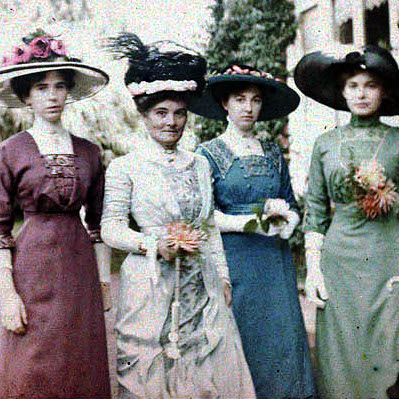
The 1909 picture cropped and colour balanced using a modern image cleaner

Gullick experimented with the early use of colour photography in Australia. The Lumière brothers' autochrome process that he used relied on using potato starch dyed to the three key colours of red, blue and green. The photo of his wife and daughters was taken with this process in about 1909 only two years after the process first went on sale. The three basic colours of the Lumière process is thought to be the reason why Gullick's family are wearing different coloured dresses. The photo is at their home in Killara.

Intriguingly these are the same three colours as basic stamp denominations used across Australia. Gullick is thought to have influenced the heraldic nature of the stamp designs. Zoe Gullick (in the red dress) helped Gullick as a laboratory assistant when he was working on his photography.

Gullick died suddenly, and his will indicates that he did not leave his family the money they might have expected. His obituary does list his hobbies which included both coin and stamp collecting and he left a lathe, many woodworking tools and a camera.
