= Coat of arms of Darwin =

Coat of arms of the City of Darwin
- Armiger: Lord Mayor of Darwin
- Adopted: 9 December 1959
- Crest: Out of a Mural Crown proper a Mariner's Compass Gules, the Rose Or, the Needle pointing to the North also Gules. Mantling: Gules, doubled Argent.
- Shield: Gules, on a Fess per pale Azure and Argent between in chief a Castle also Argent, the Portcullis raised Sable, and in base a Sun irradiated Or within an Annulet likewise Argent, a Wooden Aeroplane Propeller of early pattern erect proper, winged Argent, and on Water barry wavy proper a Sailing Ship of two masts in full sail also proper.
- Supporters: On the dexter side an Australian Aborigine with tribal markings proper holding in the exterior hand a Native Shield and supporting by the interior hand a Spear point upwards also proper, and on the sinister side a British Settler supporting with the exterior hand a Pick and Shovel likewise proper.
- Compartment: A mount Vert.
- Motto: Latin: Progrediamur

The coat of arms of Darwin were granted by Queen Elizabeth II on 9 December 1959—the same year that Darwin gained city status. The city currently only uses the arms in correspondence by the city's lord mayor. As of 2023, the arms are currently being reviewed by the city's reconciliation working group, with some councillors in 2011 calling the arms "appalling" and not representative of the city.

== Symbolism ==
The fort on the shield acknowledges the origin of Darwin as an army base, founded in order to defend the claim of the British to the entire mainland of Australia. The ship symbolises the importance of the port to Darwin in its early days. The advent of air travel is symbolised by the propeller with wings. The two supporters represent the Aboriginal people of Darwin, the original inhabitants of Darwin, and European miners which contributed significantly to the new town's prosperity. The crest contains a compass pointing north, representing the location of Darwin at the north of Australia.

== See also ==
- Australian heraldry
