= Flag of Staffordshire =

Flag of English county

- Proportion: 3:5
- Adopted: 28 March 2016
- Designed by: Staffordshire Heritage Group

The Staffordshire flag is the flag of the English county of Staffordshire. It was registered with the Flag Institute on 28 March 2016 following a competition between two rival designs. The winning design was proposed by the Staffordshire Heritage Group as a simplified version of the other candidate, the Staffordshire County Council Banner of Arms.

== Design ==
The flag incorporates the Stafford knot in gold on the de Stafford coat of arms. The symbol of the Stafford knot is unique to the county, with a venerable tradition and widespread usage. It is incorporated into the logo of the Staffordshire Rugby Union, Staffordshire County Cricket Club, Staffordshire Moorlands District Council, University of Staffordshire, and of Staffordshire Fire and Rescue Service amongst others. The colour scheme of gold on red is similarly included on many of the arms found in the county, such as the coat of arms of University of Staffordshire and Keele University as well as on the arms used by Staffordshire County Council.

=== Colours ===
The colours used on the flag are:

Scheme	Red	Yellow
Pantone (paper)	485 C	116 C
HEX	#da291c	#ffcd00
CMYK	0, 81, 87, 15	0, 20, 100, 0
RGB	218, 41, 28	255, 205, 0

== History ==
=== Stafford knot ===
The Stafford knot has long been associated with the county. The earliest known appearance of the knot in association with the Stafford family was on the 15th-century seal of Lady Joan de Stafford, Lady Wake (daughter of Hugh de Stafford, 2nd Earl of Stafford), who adapted the Wake knot for her use. The seal, on which four knots appear tied on a string around her coat of arms, is now in the British Museum. After Lady Wake died childless in 1443, her nephew Humphrey de Stafford, 6th Earl of Stafford inherited her personal property. Humphrey, who was made the Duke of Buckingham the following year, incorporated his aunt's adaptation of the Wake knot as a cordon around his seal, although he used three knots and not four.

The knot appears on a drawing of the standard of Sir Henry de Stafford, which was flown c. 1475. In a visitation of Stafford in 1583, the town's arms were recorded for the first time as or a chevron gules, a Stafford knot argent.

Future earls of Stafford retained the knot for use on heraldic badges, although the exact date of use is unknown. Early heraldic badges are poorly recorded, however, and many had multiple badges. In 1720, the Earl of Stafford used 18 badges, including the Stafford knot, all enclosed in a circle of Stafford knots. The design closely matches the early design of the pretzel, which was made to represent arms crossed in prayer. In the 19th century, it became a symbol of Staffordshire pottery. This "Staffordshire knot" was also used as a surgical suture in the 19th century. It was discarded by some as too dangerous, as the knot could slip if not tied correctly, and indeed, its use led to multiple deaths by haemorrhage.

=== Staffordshire County Council Banner ===
Banner of the arms of Staffordshire County Council.

In the absence of an adopted flag, the banner of the arms of Staffordshire County Council have been used as a symbol of Staffordshire. The arms are similar to the simple chevron and knot, but with smaller proportions of the knot and the addition of the lion Chief indicating the authority of the council. This banner had been made available commercially in the absence of an adopted flag. The design is the property of the council; however, in 2015 Staffordshire County Council declared that they would happily allow the banner to be taken forward as a county flag. The county council also declared that they were in discussion with the Flag Institute regarding formal adoption of the banner design.

In the absence of an adopted flag, the banner had been flown alongside the Union Flag above the Department for Communities and Local Government. It was also adopted by the crew of the RFA Wave Ruler in 2010, as its captain is from Stafford.

=== Modern flag ===
After a public poll, the Staffordshire Council Banner was beaten by 355 votes by the current design, which won with 566 votes.
