= Irish heraldry =

Heraldry in Ireland

Irish heraldry is the forms of heraldry, such as coats of arms, in Ireland. Since 1 April 1943 it is regulated in the Republic of Ireland by the Office of the Chief Herald of Ireland and in Northern Ireland by Norroy and Ulster King of Arms. Prior to that, heraldry on the whole island of Ireland was a function of the Ulster King of Arms, a Crown office dating from 1552. Despite its name, the Ulster King of Arms was based in Dublin.

== Office of the Chief Herald of Ireland ==
The Office of the Chief Herald of Ireland, sometimes incorrectly called the Office of Arms, is the Republic of Ireland's authority on all heraldic matters relating to Ireland and is located at the National Library of Ireland.

It has jurisdiction over:

- All Irish citizens, male or female
- Persons normally resident in Ireland
- Persons living abroad who are of provable Irish descent in either the paternal or maternal line
- Persons with significant links to Ireland
- Corporate bodies within Ireland and corporate bodies with significant links to Ireland but based in countries with no heraldic authority.

== Clan arms ==
A distinctive feature of Irish heraldry is acceptance of the idea of clan arms, which belong to descendants, not necessarily of a determinate individual, but of an Irish clan or sept, the chieftain of which, under Irish law, was not necessarily a son of the previous chieftain but could be any member of the clan whose grandfather had held the position of chieftain (tanistry). A member of the particular clan has the right to display the arms of that clan, a right that on the contrary does not belong to people of the same surname who belong to a different sept. For example, a person from the O'Kelly clan of Ui Máine may display the arms of that clan, but a Kelly of the Meath or Kilkenny clan cannot.

Proponents of English heraldry and those who hold a documented right to arms see clan arms as controversial, but the Irish Genealogical Office (previously known as the Office of Arms) "holds that any member of a clan may display the arms of that clan (as distinct from personally 'bearing' the arms, as on stationery, silver, or other such use, [for] only the grantee and his descendants may 'bear' the arms)". Edward MacLysaght, the first Chief Herald of Ireland and the author of several works on Irish families, introduced this distinction.

Pat Brennan writes that we simply do not have enough evidence to be doctrinaire about clan or sept arms. He adds: "Naturally the idea of clan or sept arms is anathema to English heraldic practice (like a lot of other Gaelic Irish customs)." However, to show that it is not totally unique, he cites H. Bedington & P. Gwynn-Jones, Heraldry (Greenwich, CT 1993): "In eastern Europe whole groups of families or territorial areas adopted the same armorial bearings (in) a form of clan affiliation." Brennan particularly points to heraldry in Poland, where arms may pertain to a whole group of families. In one extreme Polish case almost 600 families bear the same symbol - a horse-shoe enclosing a cross.

Even after the introduction of English heraldry into Ireland and the setting up of arrangements for regulating it, the arms registered were undifferentiated, that is, they show no signs of the practice of changing a tincture or adding some symbol to personalize those of a particular individual. Brennan concludes that, rather than being the property of an individual, the arms belonged either to the sept as a whole or to the chief or to all members of the ruling elite in the sept. The hundreds of people claiming the right to arms indicate, Brennan says, either that they had used those arms for some time, or that the arms did not belong personally to the chief or that they were obviously based on the ancient clan system, so that the chief could not complain of their use by others.

The arms of the Butlers

The arms of the FitzGeralds

The arms of the FitzPatricks of Ossory

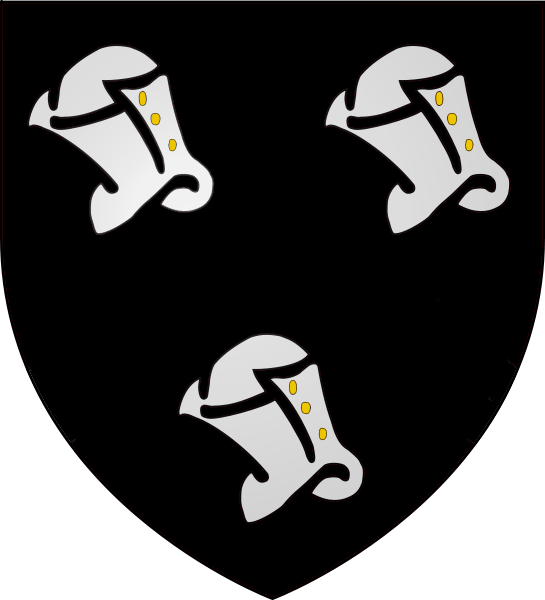
The arms of the Kennedys

The arms of the MacCarthy, king of Desmond and in earlier centuries, king of Munster.

The arms of McGraths

The arms of Magennis

The arms of O'Donnell, king of Tyrconnell

The arms of Nugent

The arms of the O'Briens of Thomond

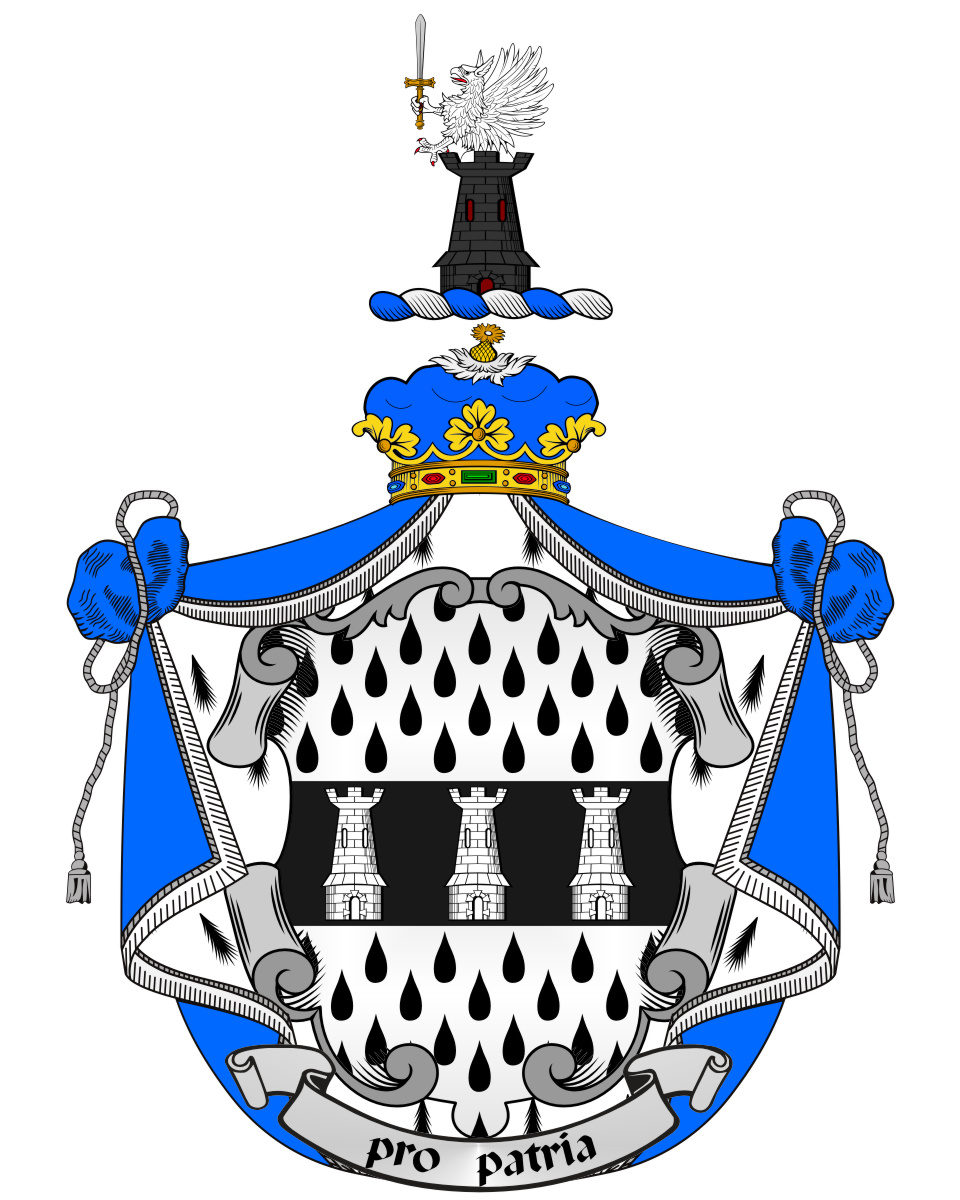
The arms of The O'Higgins, Lord of Ballynary

The arms of the O'Neill of Tyrone

The arms of Purcell, Baron of Loughmore

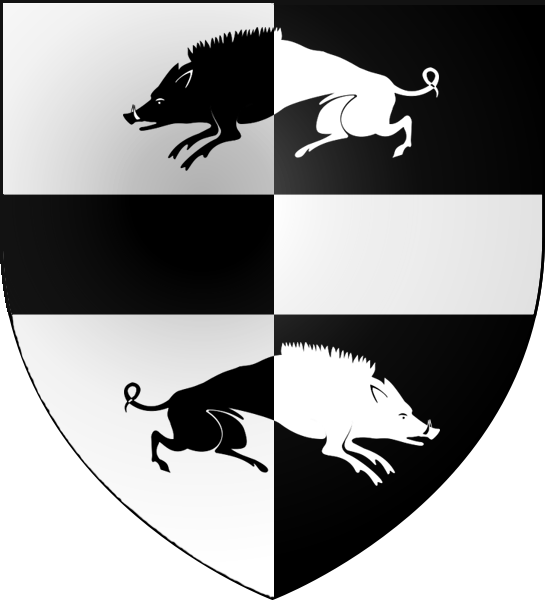
The arms of the O'Sullivan

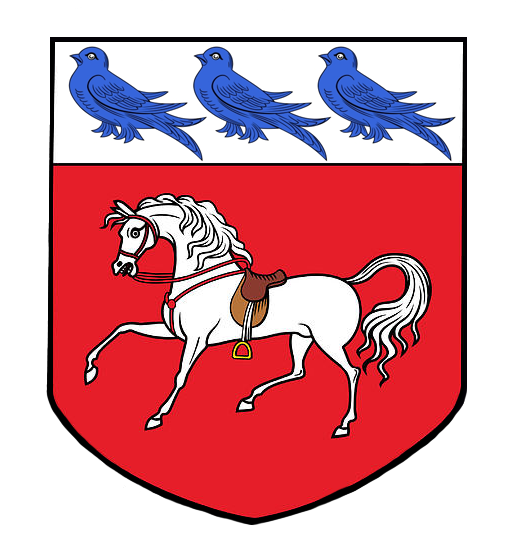
The arms of the O'Halloran Clan, ancient Lords of Galway

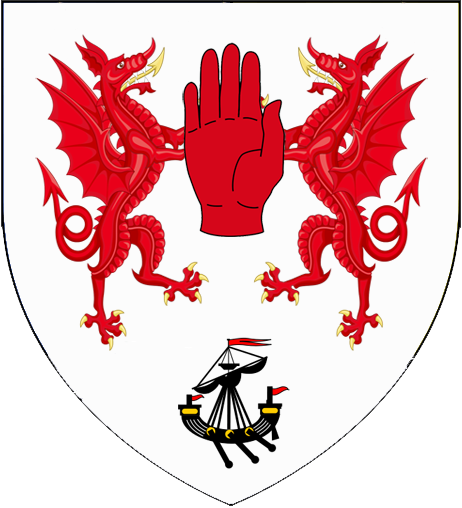
The arms of the O'Flaherty

The arms of Lynch

== Terminology ==
In English, achievements of arms are usually described (blazoned) in a specialized jargon that uses derivatives of French terms. In Irish, however, achievements of arms are described in language which, while formal and different from plain language, is not quite so opaque as Anglo-Norman terminology is in English. Nevertheless, Irish heraldic terminology is a kind of specialized jargon. Examples used since 1943 include the use of Irish gorm and uaine for blue and green, as compared to the French-derived azure and vert used in English blazon.

Tinctures	Paints or Colours				
Escutcheons					
English	Azure	Gules	Vert	Purpure	Sable
Irish	Gorm	Dearg	Uaine	Corcra	Dubh
Tinctures	Metals		Furs		
Escutcheons					
English	Or	Argent	Ermine	Vair	
Irish	Ór (órga)	Airgead (airgidí)	Eirmín	Véir	

Ordinaries Ríphíosaí				
English	Pale	Fess	Bend	Bend sinister
Irish	Cuaille	Balc	Bandán	Clébhandán
Ordinaries Ríphíosaí				
English	Chevron	Chief	Cross	Saltire
Irish	Rachtán	Barr	Cros	Sailtír
Ordinaries Ríphíosaí				
English	Pall	Pall subverted	Pile	Bordure
Irish	Gabhal	Gabhal aisiompaithe	Ding	Imeallbhord

Division of the field					
English	Party per fess	Party per pale	Party per bend sinister	Quarterly	Quarterly charged with an inescutcheon
Irish	Gearrtha	Deighilte	Cléroinnte	Ceathair-roinnte	Ceathair-roinnte móide lársciath

Lines of division				
English	Wavy	Indented	Engrailed	Invected
Irish	Camógach	Eangach	Clasach	Dronnógach
Lines of division				
English	Nebuly	Embattled	Dovetailed	Potenty
Irish	Néalach	Táibhleach	Déadach	Cathógach

== Coat of arms of Ireland ==
The escutcheon (left) and crest (right) used by the British monarchs to represent their dominion over Ireland. In 1945, the newly independent Republic of Ireland adopted the same shield, Azure a harp Or stringed argent, to represent their state.

The Coat of arms of Ireland is blazoned as Azure a harp Or, stringed argent – a gold harp with silver strings on a blue background. The harp, and specifically the cláirseach (or Gaelic harp), has long been Ireland's heraldic emblem. It appears on the coat of arms which were officially registered as the arms of the state of Ireland on 9 November 1945. The harp has been recognised as a symbol of Ireland since the 13th century.
