= Stafford knot =

Three-looped overhand knot that is the traditional symbol of Staffordshire

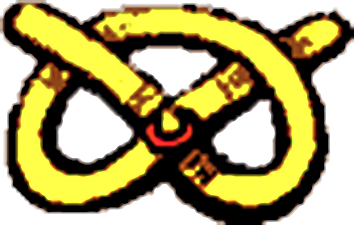
- The Stafford badge

Information
- Family: Stafford family

The Stafford knot, more commonly known as the Staffordshire knot, is a distinctive three-looped knot that is the traditional symbol of the English county of Staffordshire and of its county town, Stafford. It is a particular representation of the simple overhand knot, the most basic knot of all.

== Origins ==
One legend of its origin, generally considered mythical, is that three convicted criminals who had committed a crime together were due to be executed in Stafford gaol. There was argument over who should be hanged first but the hangman solved the problem by devising this knot and hanging the three simultaneously. The knot can be seen on a 4-foot-high (1.2 m) carved Anglo-Saxon cross in a churchyard in Stoke-upon-Trent, giving its name as the Staffordshire Knot and also on a seventh-century Anglo-Saxon object from the Staffordshire hoard. This strongly suggests it pre-dates the Norman and medieval period, being probably either a heraldic symbol of early Mercia or a Celtic Christian symbol brought to Staffordshire by missionary monks from Lindisfarne.

The flag of the historic county of Staffordshire

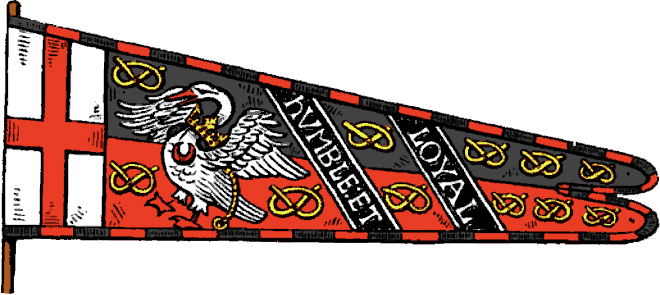
The Stafford family heraldic flag, blazoned with eleven Stafford knots

Flag of the city of Brisbane

The earliest known appearance of the knot in association with the Stafford family was on the 15th-century seal of Lady Joan de Stafford, Lady Wake (daughter of Hugh de Stafford, 2nd Earl of Stafford), who adapted the Wake knot for her use. The seal, on which four knots appear tied on a string around her coat of arms, is now in the British Museum. After Lady Wake died childless in 1443, her nephew Humphrey de Stafford, 6th Earl of Stafford inherited her personal property. Humphrey, who was made the Duke of Buckingham the following year, incorporated his aunt's adaptation of the Wake knot as a cordon around his seal, although he used three knots and not four.

The knot appears on a drawing of the standard of Sir Henry de Stafford, which was flown c. 1475. In a visitation of Stafford in 1583, the town's arms were recorded for the first time as or a chevron gules, a Stafford knot argent. These arms, which represent the traditional Stafford arms with the addition of the knot, is still the flag of Staffordshire (albeit with the knot changed from white to gold).

Future earls of Stafford retained the knot for use on heraldic badges, although the exact date of use is unknown. Early heraldic badges are poorly recorded, however, and many had multiple badges. In 1720, the Earl of Stafford used 18 badges, including the Stafford knot, all enclosed in a circle of Stafford knots. The design closely matches the early design of the pretzel, which was made to represent arms crossed in prayer. In the 19th century, it became a symbol of Staffordshire pottery. This "Staffordshire knot" was also used as a surgical suture in the 19th century. It was discarded by some as too dangerous, as the knot could slip if not tied correctly, and indeed, its use led to multiple deaths by haemorrhage.

== Usage ==
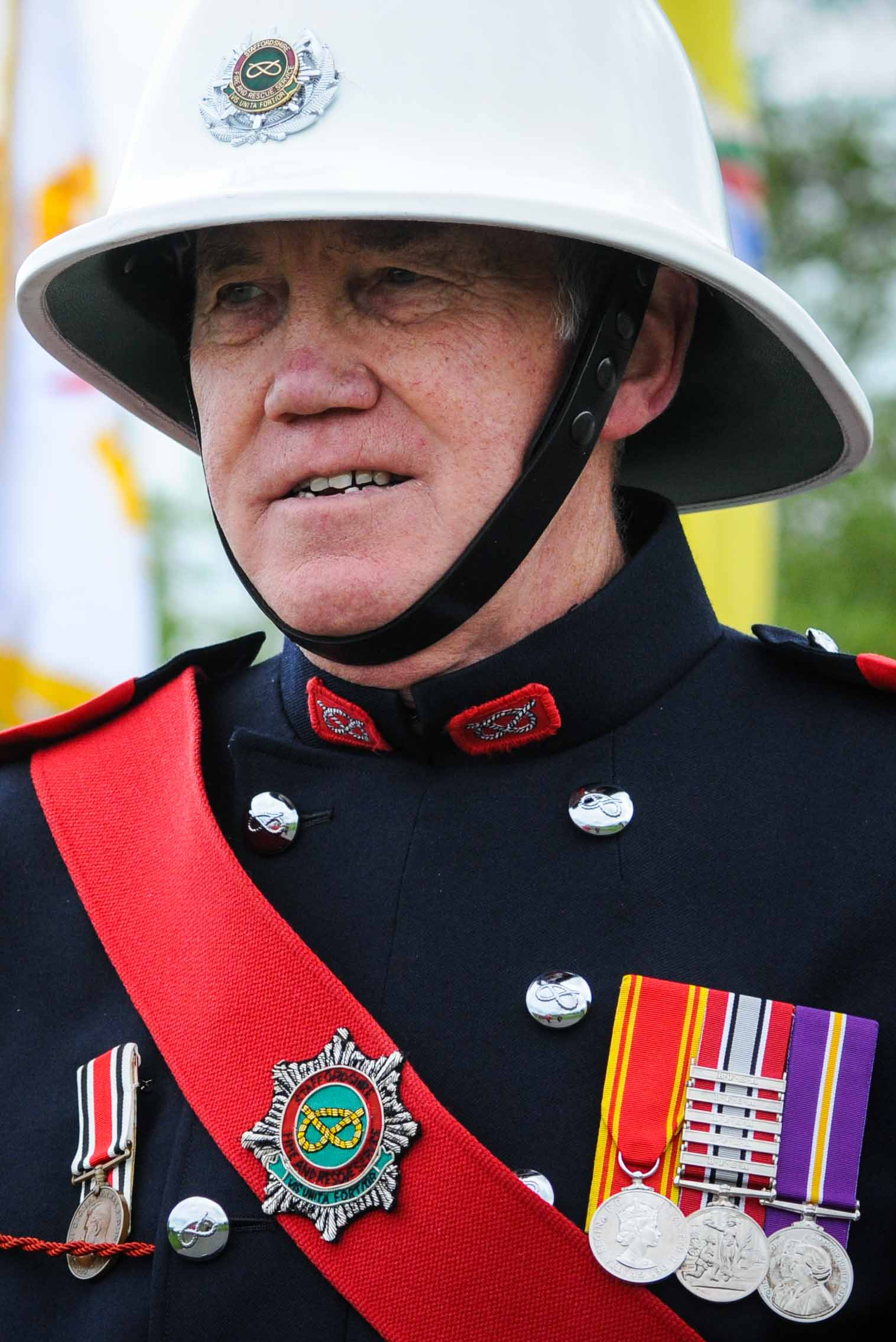
Stafford knots on the uniform of a member of the Staffordshire Fire and Rescue Service's Ceremonial Squad

The knot appears prominently on the flag of the historic county of Staffordshire, as well as on the banners of Staffordshire County Council and Staffordshire Moorlands District Council. The motto of the county council – "the knot unites" – refers to the Stafford knot. It also appears on the coat of arms of the Borough of Stafford. The knot appears on the logos of both Staffordshire University and Keele University, as well as on many school badges.

Stoke-on-Trent based professional football teams Port Vale and Stoke City both use the knot on their club crests. A number of Non-league clubs also feature the knot including Chasetown, Hanley Town, Hednesford Town, Leek Town, Lichfield City, Newcastle Town, Tamworth, Stafford Rangers and Wolverhampton Casuals. Additionally, West Midlands club Darlaston Town (1874) also feature the knot as the town of Darlaston was historically part of Staffordshire. The knot also features on the badge of Staffordshire County Cricket Club.

The Stafford knot was the badge of the 38th (1st Staffordshire) Regiment of Foot in which Sir Thomas Brisbane entered the British Army as an ensign in 1789 – and thus the eponymous city of Brisbane in Queensland, Australia, has the Stafford knot on its arms. The knot formed part of the insignia of the North Staffordshire Regiment, South Staffordshire Regiment, Staffordshire Regiment and currently is the arm badge of the Mercian Regiment. It is also used as the badge of the Staffordshire Police force and Staffordshire Fire and Rescue Service. Staffordshire wing of the Air Training Corps also uses the knot on its crest.

Also used as a pin/lapel badge by members of Freemasonry under the Provincial Grand Lodge of Staffordshire.

The North Staffordshire Railway, an independent railway company in the county from 1845 until the compulsory grouping of the railways in 1923, was colloquially referred to as The Knotty after the knot. The knot symbol appeared in the railway company's badge. The Smiler, a roller coaster at Alton Towers, has a combined section of track known as the "Stafford/Staffordshire Knot", consisting of a cobra roll entwined with a batwing. It is given this nickname due to the resemblance to the original knot shape.

In an article published in the Birmingham Evening Mail on 1 June 1965, journalist Roy Smith described plans for the Gravelly Hill Interchange as "like a cross between a plate of spaghetti and an unsuccessful attempt at a Staffordshire knot", with the headline above the article on the newspaper's front page, written by sub-editor Alan Eaglesfield, reading "Spaghetti Junction".
