= Mantling =

In heraldry, drapery tied to the helmet above the shield

Mantling, purpure doubled or

Red and white mantling on the coat of arms of the Hungarian Gutkeled clan.

In heraldry, mantling or "lambrequin" (its name in French) is drapery tied to the helmet above the shield. In paper heraldry it is a depiction of the protective cloth covering (often of linen) worn by knights from their helmets to stave off the elements (namely, direct sunlight which could heat the inside of the helmet to unbearable temperatures especially in summer), and, secondarily, to decrease the effects of sword-blows against the helmet in battle, from which it is usually shown tattered or cut to shreds; less often it is shown as an intact drape, principally in those cases where clergy use a helmet and mantling (to symbolise that, despite the perhaps contradictory presence of the helmet, they have not been involved in combat), although this is usually the artist's discretion and done for decorative rather than symbolic reasons.

Generally, mantling is blazoned mantled x, doubled [lined] y; the cloth has two sides, one of a colour and the other of a metal. The mantling is usually in the main colours of the shield, or else in the livery colours that symbolize the entity bearing the arms, though there are exceptions, with occasional tinctures differing from these, or occasional examples in which the outside of the mantling is per pale of two colours or both the inside and outside are per pale, and even rarer examples of other divisions, and there is a perhaps unique example in which the lining of the mantling is per pale of the two metals or of the entire mantling being of a single tincture. The mantling of the Black Loyalist Heritage Society is a unique example in which the mantling is of two furs (ermines, lined ermine). There is also the unique example of the mantling of Bruce Douglas Bolton, which is tartan on the outside. The coat of arms of Canada is mantled white and red, or argent doubled gules; furthermore, the current standard rendering of the Canadian arms has mantling in the shape of maple leaves. The arms of sovereigns are a common exception. The arms of the United Kingdom are or, lined ermine, such a mantling often being held to be limited to sovereigns.

In the early days of the development of the crest, before the torse (wreath), crest coronets and chapeaux were developed, the crest often "continued into the mantling" if this was feasible (the clothes worn by a demi-human figure, or the fur of the animal, for instance, allowing or encouraging this). It still holds true frequently in Germany.

There are rare examples where the mantling is blazoned to complement the armiger's coat of arms, mimicking the ordinaries and charges on the escutcheon. When charges occur, they are usually displayed as a semy.

Over the centuries, the depiction of the mantling became a mark of the artist's skill and versatility; while most other elements of a crest or coat of arms tended to follow strict design rules, the mantling allowed much more freedom of expression. Early medieval drawn mantlings tended to be relatively plain and truer to actual mantlings worn by knights. From about the 1500s, mantlings were drawn increasingly intricate and tattered, with many wound and corkscrewed strands and elements. As one of the few binding demands towards heraldically correct mantlings which still apply today, they must depict even the most intricate and wound tatterings realistically and plausibly, which requires great skill and spatial ability on behalf of the artist.

== See also ==
- Mantle and pavilion (heraldry)
