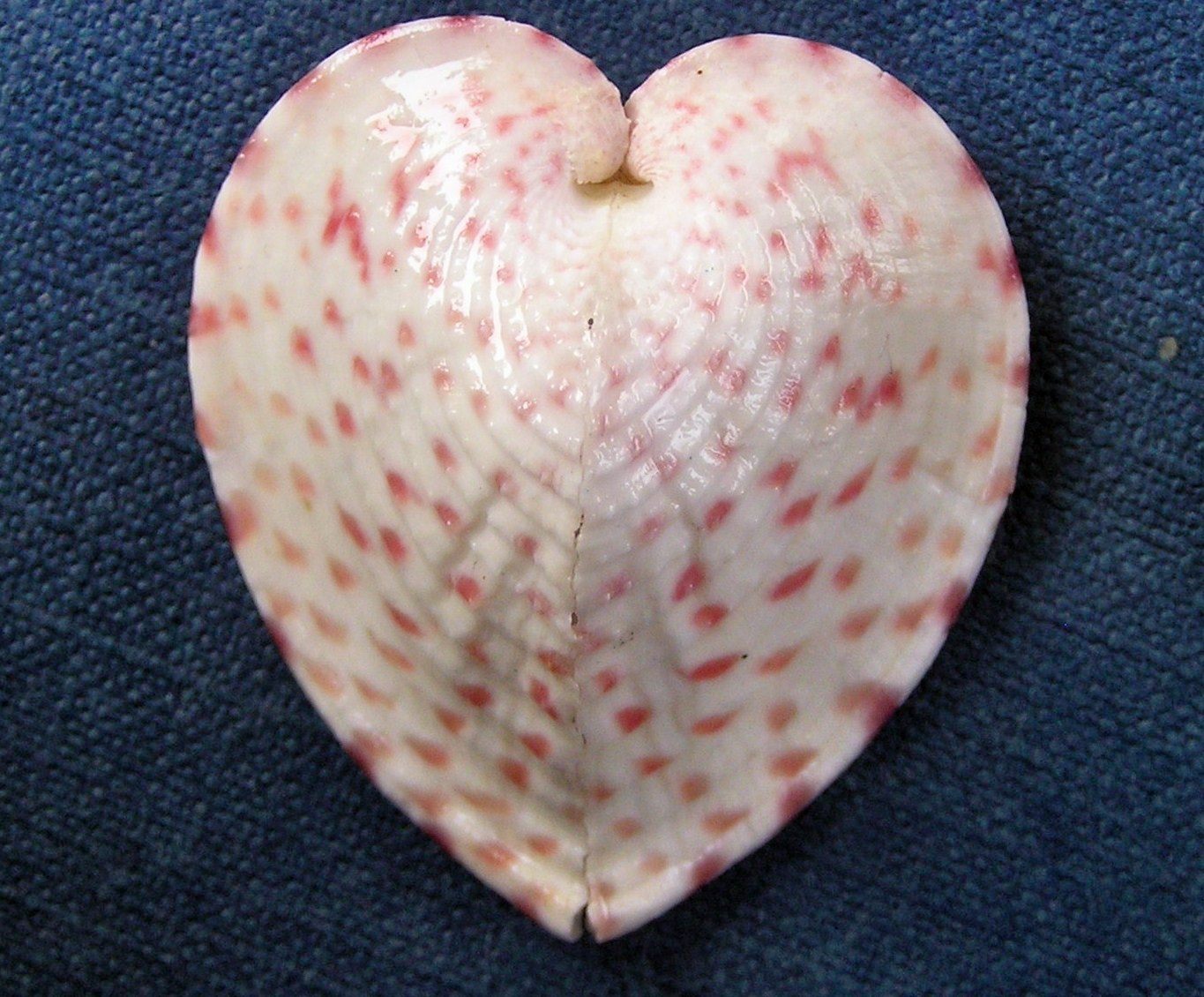
- Corculum cardissa

Scientific classification
- Kingdom: Animalia
- Phylum: Mollusca
- Class: Bivalvia
- Order: Cardiida
- Family: Cardiidae
- Genus: Corculum
- Species: C. cardissa

Binomial name
- Corculum cardissa (Linnaeus, 1758)

Synonyms
- Cardissa alba Megerle von Mühlfeld, 1811; Cardium aequale Deshayes, 1855; Cardium cardissa Linnaeus, 1758; Cardium dionaeum Broderip & Sowerby, 1829; Cardium humanum Chemnitz: Römer, Cardium impressum Lightfoot, 1786; Cardium inversum Lamarck, 1819; Cardium junoniae Lamarck, 1819; Cardium monstrosum Gmelin, 1791; Cardium productum Deshayes, 1855; Cardium replicatum Spengler, 1799; Cardium spinosa Swainson, 1840; Cardium unimaculatum Sowerby, 1833; Corculum aselae Bartsch, 1947; Corculum dolorosum Röding, 1798; Corculum humanum Röding, 1798; Corculum inflatum Röding, 1798; Corculum kirai Shikama, 1964; Corculum levigatum Bartsch, 1947; Corculum obesum Bartsch, 1947

= Corculum cardissa =

Species of bivalve

Corculum cardissa, the heart cockle, is a species of marine bivalve mollusc in the family Cardiidae. It is found in the Indo-Pacific region. It has a symbiotic relationship with dinoflagellates (zooxanthellae), which live within its tissues.

== Description ==
The two valves of Corculum cardissa are unequal in size and often asymmetric. Their shape is very variable but viewed from above, the outline is roughly heart shaped which gives the molluscs their common name. Viewed from the side the shape bears a resemblance to the shell of a cockle (Cerastoderma spp.). In some specimens the posterior valve is nearly flat or has a slight hump. In others it is more rounded.

The boundary of the valves is usually flat but is sometimes somewhat sinuous. Smaller shells tend to be elongated; larger shells are more rounded and the growth rings can be seen clearly. The shell is thin and translucent, particularly the upper side. There is an intricate mosaic pattern of more and less transparent white regions. The lower valve has a mainly white surface with a few transparent regions. The gills and mantle, especially the lower siphon, are dark brown owing to the presence of microscopic algae. The outer surface of the mantle also contains granules of reddish, purple and blue pigment.

Right and left valve of the same specimen:

Right valve

Left valve

== Habitat ==
Corculum cardissa is often found lying on a surface of sand among coral debris and broken shells. It usually lies horizontally in a hollow it excavates and its top is often covered with filamentous algae and muddy deposits.

== Biology ==
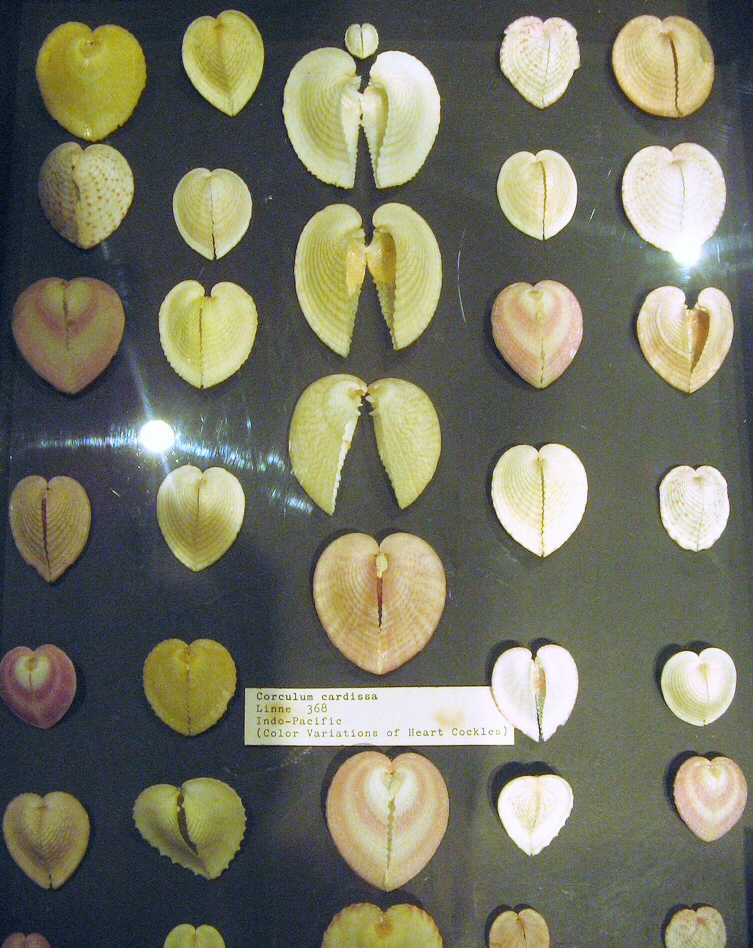
Colour variations of Corculum cardissa

Corculum cardissa is a filter feeder. The shell gapes slightly at the ventral end and two siphons are protruded. Water is drawn in through one and expelled through the other and plankton and detritus are extracted. At the same time, water passes over the gills where oxygen is absorbed.

Corculum cardissa is a hermaphrodite. Eggs are laid and the larvae develop with great rapidity. Within 24 hours of fertilisation, the veliger larvae have been observed to develop two valves and be swimming on the surface of the substrate. A day later, they had undergone metamorphosis and had settled on the bottom as juveniles, miniature versions of the adult bivalves.

== Ecology ==
Corculum cardissa and some other members of the family Cardiidae live in symbiosis with dinoflagellates in the genus Symbiodinium. These are found in the mantle, gills and the liver. It was originally thought that the photosynthetic algae were in the haemocoel, the fluid between the cells. It has since been found however that, in response to the presence of Symbiodinium, a tertiary series of tubules develop from the walls of the digestive system and ramify through the tissues. The algae are found in these and are separated from the blood cells in the haemolymph by a layer one cell thick. This is analogous to the tertiary tubular system found in Tridacna and first described by Mansour in 1946, but subsequently overlooked by other researchers. The algae enter the system through the mouth. The translucent shell and the bivalve's habit of lying on the surface both encourage photosynthesis in the algae. The mollusc benefits from the metabolites produced and the alga benefits from a safe environment in which to live.

The other photosymbiotic bivalve, the giant clams, allow sunlight to fall onto the photosynthetic organisms inside by opening their shell during the day. Unlike the giant clams, the corculum cardissa keep the shell closed, and let sunlight shine through transparent windows in their shells. Within each window, aragonite forms narrow optical fibers (~1 μm diameter) perpendicular to the surface. Beneath each window, microlenses condense light to penetrate more deeply into the symbiont-rich tissue.
