= Torse =

Twisted roll of fabric in heraldry

In heraldry, a torse or wreath is a twisted roll of fabric laid about the top of the helmet and the base of the crest. It has the dual purpose of masking the join between helm and crest, and of holding the mantling in place.

The torse is sometimes mistakenly said to represent the token, called a favour, such as a handkerchief or sleeve, which the knight's lady-love gave him to wear when he left for the wars or participated in tournaments. The purpose of the torse is known to be the masking of the "unsightly joining" of the helmet and the crest. However, it is possible that a knight might "twist [the favour] in and out or over and over the fillet which surrounded the joining-place of crest and helmet." Thus the favour (lady's handkerchief) might be twisted into the torse.

The torse is blazoned as part of the crest. For example, the crest of the coat of arms of Canada is blazoned "On a wreath of the colours Argent and Gules, a lion passant guardant Or imperially crowned proper and holding in the dexter paw a maple leaf Gules." The tinctures of the torse are generally not mentioned in the blazon, as they are assumed to be of the principal metal and colour in the shield. Like the mantling, the torse must always be of a metal and a colour; usually the torse and the mantling have the same tinctures. In British heraldry, the torse is generally shown with six twists of material, alternately metal and colour.

The abstracted torse is a modern development in which the twisted cloth of the torse appears as a solid, straight bar or pole, of twisted colors. This later development is due a design simplification of the blazoned torse.

Occasionally the torse is replaced by a crown or coronet, which is then termed a "crest-coronet". In the past this practice was widespread amongst all ranks, but is nowadays usually denied to those outside royalty and the peerage, except in special circumstances. Some commoners have bypassed this rule by placing a coronet on top of a torse, rather than in place of it.

The torse is also often used as a decoration on a heraldic animal, either across the brow, as a form of circlet, or around the neck. Moors and Saracens are traditionally depicted in heraldry with a torse across their brow.

== Gallery ==
A typical heraldic representation of the torse

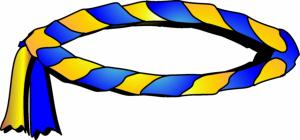
Torse

The arms of Sardinia feature four moors' heads with torses across their brows

The crest of the King of Canada (and badge of the office of the Governor General of Canada), a crowned lion holding a maple leaf atop a torse.

placing a coronet on top of a torse, rather than in place of it (House of Melun)

The arms of Suffolk County Council afford an example of a crest-coronet. The crest is placed upon an "ancient crown" rather than the usual torse

== See also ==
- Agal (accessory)
