= Law of heraldic arms =

Law governing possession and use of arms

The law of heraldic arms, sometimes simply laws of heraldry, governs the possession, use or display of arms, called bearing of arms. That use includes the coats of arms, coat armour or armorial bearings. Originally with the sole function of enabling knights to identify each other on the battlefield, they soon acquired wider, more decorative uses. Today they are used by countries, public and private institutions or individuals. The first laws regarding arms were written by Bartolus de Saxoferrato and the officials who administer these matters today are called pursuivants, heralds, or kings of arms. (Note: Here displayed in increasing order of seniority. The kings of arms is the senior rank of an officer of arms. In many heraldic traditions, only a king of arms has the authority to grant armorial bearings and sometimes certify genealogies and noble titles. In other traditions, the power has been delegated to other officers of similar rank.) The law of arms is part of the law in countries which regulate heraldry, although not part of common law in England and in countries whose laws derive from English law. In most European countries without monarchies, much like in the United States, there are no laws against assuming arms, with the closest legal authenticity mechanism being a pictorial copyright protection. (Note: Austria, Bulgaria, Croatia, Cyprus, Czech Republic, Estonia, Finland, France, Greece, Hungary, Latvia, Lithuania, Malta, Poland, Portugal, Romania, Slovakia and Slovenia do not recognize heraldic authorities nor institutes whereas Ireland and Germany have laws in place.)

== Right to bear arms ==
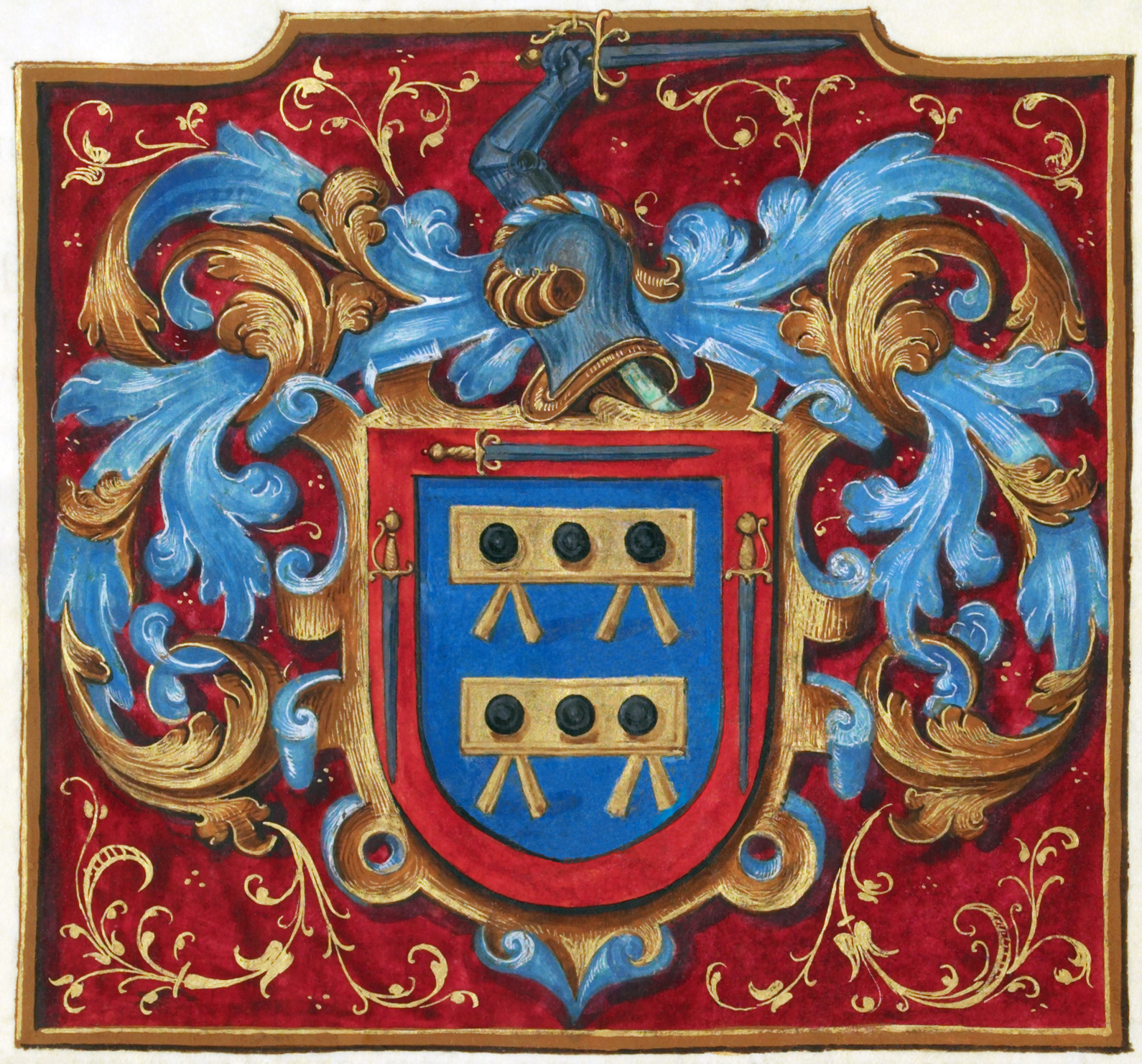
Illustration from a manuscript grant of arms by Philip II of Spain to Alonso de Mesa and Hernando de Mesa, signed 25 November 1566. Digitally restored.

According to the usual description of the law of arms, coats of arms, armorial badges, flags and standards and other similar emblems of honour may only be borne by virtue of ancestral right, or of a grant made to the user under due authority. Ancestral right means descent in the male line from an ancestor who lawfully bore arms. Due authority has, since late medieval times, been the Crown or the State.

In the United Kingdom and Commonwealth, the Crown's prerogative of granting arms is delegated to one of several authorities depending on the country. In England, Wales and Northern Ireland, the authority to grant arms is delegated to the Kings of Arms of the College of Arms, under the direction of the Earl Marshal. In Scotland, this authority is delegated to Lord Lyon King of Arms at his or her own discretion. In Canada, it is exercised by the Canadian Heraldic Authority under the direction of the Governor General of Canada.

In Ireland, unlike the position in the United Kingdom, a grant of arms from an official authority is not a legal prerequisite to the use of arms. For example, heraldic symbols and coats of arms that existed pre-1552 and afterwards belonged to the Gaelic tradition may continue in use, as well as arms without any official basis.

In Spain, whilst the power to grant new arms is restricted to the king, the Cronistas de Armas (Chroniclers of Arms) have the power to certify arms within the province(s) of their appointment. As of 2008, there is currently only one, with authority only in the provinces of Castile and León.

== Law of arms as part of the general law ==
While the degree to which the general law recognises arms differs, in both England and Scotland a grant of arms confers certain rights upon the grantee and his (or her) heirs, even if they may not be easily protected. No person may lawfully have the same coat of arms as another person in the same heraldic jurisdiction although in England the bearing of identical arms without differencing marks by descendants from a common armigerous ancestor has been widespread and tolerated by the College of Arms.

Although the common law courts do not regard coats of arms as either property or as being defensible by action, armorial bearings are a form of property nevertheless, generally described as tesserae gentilitatis or insignia of gentility. Armorial bearings are incorporeal and impartible hereditaments, inalienable, and descendable according to the law of arms. Generally speaking (there have been very rare examples of patents in which the arms are granted to descend with some different limitation), this means they are inherited by the issue (male and female) in the male line of the grantee, though they can be inherited as quarterings by the sons of an heraldic heiress, where there is no surviving male heir, provided her issue also have a right to bear arms in their own male line.

=== Belgium ===
The Belgian law of arms is now regulated by the country's three heraldic authorities: the Council of Nobility, the Council of Heraldry and Vexillology, and the Flemish Heraldic Council.

=== Canada ===
The Canadian law of arms is now regulated by the Canadian Heraldic Authority.

=== Denmark ===
In Denmark the unlawful use of coats of arms and other insignia of Danish and foreign authorities is a criminal offence (Danish Criminal Code §§ 132–133). Non-official coats of arms are not protected. A specific rendition of a coat of arms is protected through copyright law and a coat of arms can be used as a trademark and will thus be protected by trademark law. There is no official heraldic authority for private arms in Denmark. Most insignia used by municipalities are regulated by the Heraldic Consultant to the Danish State (an office under the Danish National Archives). Registration by the Heraldic Consultant to the Danish State is a prerequisite for protection of official Danish insignia under the Criminal Code's §§ 132–133. Protection of an insignia in terms of trademark law requires registration by the trademark authorities. If an insignia is registered by the Heraldic Consultant, trademark rights are automatically acquired as well.

During the Absolutist era, arms of nobility were granted by the King's herald, but this office was dissolved in 1849 when the absolutist era ended. Since then, the only way to acquire coats of arms in Denmark is through assumption. The Danish state has never claimed any exclusive right to grant arms and families and individuals has always had the freedom to assume arms.

=== England and Wales ===
In England, the exclusive jurisdiction of deciding rights to arms, and claims of descent, is vested in the Court of Chivalry. As the substance of the common law is found in the judgments of the common law courts, so the substance of the Law of Arms can only be found in the customs and usages of the Court of Chivalry. However, the records of this are sparse, not least because the court never gave reasoned judgments (the Lord Chief Justice who sat in 1954 offering the sole exception to this, no doubt because of his professional background as a common law Judge). The procedure was based on that of the civil law, but the substantive law was recognised to be English, and peculiar to the Court of Chivalry.

Until 1945, the display of coats of arms (engravings, public paintings, etc.) were taxed, with no distinction made in the statute between arms granted by the College of Arms or those which were self-assumed.

=== France ===
In France, according to consistent case law, since 1949 and to this day: "Coats of arms differ essentially from titles of nobility in that they are merely marks of recognition accessory to the family name to which they are indissolubly attached, whether that family is noble or not. It follows that coats of arms are the attribute of the entire family and enjoy the same protection as the name itself, and that the judicial courts competent to hear disputes relating to family names are likewise competent to hear disputes that may arise concerning coats of arms". Administrative courts are, for their part, competent to hear disputes concerning coats of arms of public bodies.

=== Germany ===
In Germany the arms relate to a family, and so a name, and not to an individual. The right to the arms passes from the original bearer to those of his legitimate direct descendants by a male line. Since 1918 heraldic affairs are handled under the Civil Law. The right to arms is now considered analogous to the right to names, expressed in the Bürgerliches Gesetzbuch § 12; this interpretation was confirmed in 1992 by the Federal Court of Justice of Germany. Thus, if one has the right to certain arms, that right is protected by the courts. Personal arms are protected as a part of the name if the arms are officially recorded and published.

=== Ireland ===
In Ireland the granting of arms to Irish citizens or to those who can prove Irish ancestry is considered to be a cultural tradition which is allowed through the Office of the Chief Herald of Ireland. This office was established under the English Crown in 1552 as the Ulster King of Arms and was converted to the Chief Herald's Office after the 1937 Constitution of Ireland.

The Office of Chief Herald was given statutory force in the National Cultural Institutions Act 1997. However some doubts remained as to the effectiveness of the 1997 Act and proposals for further legislative amendment have been made by individual public representatives. For example, on 8 May 2006 Senator Brendan Ryan introduced the Genealogy & Heraldry Bill, 2006, in Seanad Éireann (Irish Senate) to this end.

=== Italy ===
Speaking very generally, Italian coats of arms may be said to be familial rather than personal. A formal system for indicating cadency is unknown outside the House of Savoy. In Italy there has been no official regulation of familial coats of arms or titles of nobility since abolition of the Consulta Araldica in 1948, and that body addressed itself primarily to state recognition of titles of nobility rather than the heraldry of untitled armigers such as nobili (untitled nobles) and patrizi (of the patriciates in the former city-states). Until the unification of the country in the decade leading to 1870, the issuance and use of familial coats of arms was exercised rather loosely in the various Italian states, with each region applying its own laws, and the principal focus was titles of nobility or (before c. 1800) feudal rights. Indeed, upon ennoblement, a count or baron not from an armigerous family might actually assume his own, original coat of arms without recourse to any authority. For this reason, actual grants of arms were very rare. There is no complete armory of Italian coats of arms, though certain authors, most importantly Giambattista Crollalanza, compiled references which appear to be nearly complete. Until the establishment of the republic (1946) and its constitution two years later, most coats of arms in Italy appertained to noble families, whether titled or not, although a number of blazons were identified with cittadini (burghers) whose families had used these for a century or more. The Blasonario contemplated by the Consulta Araldica would have been an official compilation of blazons (i.e. an armory), but it was still in a very early draft stage when the monarchy was abolished in 1946. In 1967 the Constitutional Court ruled that nobiliary and heraldic matters were "outside the scope of the law". Italy's concordat with the Vatican in 1984, revising the Lateran Treaties, abrogated the article whereby Italy recognises papal titles.

=== Norway ===
The national arms and the royal arms sort under the Ministry of Foreign Affairs, and military arms are a matter of the heads of each branch of the Norwegian Armed Forces. The National Archives of Norway are the heraldic authority for the royal approbation of municipal arms. Public arms are protected by the Norwegian Penal Code, article 328. The same article prohibits as well unauthorised use of foreign public arms and some distinctive signs of international organizations.

There exists no official authority for private arms and the question of legal protection of private arms has not been asked to a Norwegian legal court. Personal arms, family arms and other private arms have been self assumed in Norway since the Middle Ages, without any grants, interference or protests from the public authorities.

=== Scotland ===
The law of arms as understood in Scotland consists of two principal parts, the rules of heraldry (such as blazoning), and the law of heraldry. In contrast to the position in England, the Law of Arms is a branch of the civil law. A coat of arms is incorporeal heritable property, governed, subject to certain specialities, by the general law applicable to such property. The possession of armorial bearings is therefore unquestionably a question of property. The misappropriation of arms is a real injury, actionable under the common law of Scotland.

=== South Africa ===
Under South African law, which is Roman–Dutch, all citizens have the right to assume and bear arms as they please, provided they do not infringe the rights of others (e.g. by bearing the same arms). The Bureau of Heraldry has the power to register coats of arms to protect against misuse, but registration of arms is voluntary.

=== United States ===
In the United States protection of coats of arms is for the most part limited to specific units of the armed forces, with a few exceptions. George Washington, in personal correspondence, expressed opposition to establishment of a national heraldic authority, though he made use of his own ancestral arms. Personal coats of arms may be freely assumed but the right to these blazons is not protected in any way. It is possible that a coat of arms could be successfully protected as a trademark or service mark, but, in general, such protection is reserved for commercial use as a mark connected with a good or service, and not as a heraldic coat of arms. For example, the University of Texas at Austin has registered its emblem and coat of arms for use in its capacity as an institution of higher education. Moreover, such protection presumes a specific graphic design or work of art, while blazon is a description which may be widely interpreted artistically. A specific coat of arms could be protected by copyright as a pictorial, graphic or sculptural work. The usual requirements of originality and artistic creativity would need to be met; neither notice nor registration is required but may be advisable.

== Enforcement of the law of arms ==
=== England: Court of Chivalry ===
In England the officer with power to adjudicate on legal aspects of the law of arms is the Earl Marshal, whose court is known as the Court of Chivalry. The court was established some time prior to the late fourteenth century with jurisdiction over certain military matters, which came to include misuse of arms.

Its jurisdiction and powers were successively reduced by the common law courts to the point where, after 1737, the Court ceased to be convened and was in time regarded as obsolete and no longer in existence. That understanding was authoritatively overturned, however, by a revival of the Court in 1954, when the Earl Marshal appointed the then Lord Chief Justice to sit as his surrogate. The Lord Chief Justice Lord Goddard confirmed that the Court retained both its existence and its powers, and ruled in favour of the suit before him.

However, in his judgement (Manchester Corporation v Manchester Palace of Varieties [1955] P 133) Lord Goddard suggested that

if this court is to sit again it should be convened only where there is some really substantial reason for the exercise of its jurisdiction.

In 1970, Arundel Herald Extraordinary advised Wolfson College, Oxford (who were considering whether to invoke a controversial University privilege in order to avoid paying for a grant of arms) that the effect of Lord Goddard's dictum "must make any further sitting of the court unlikely even for a cause of instance; and the revival of causes of office, which were obsolescent even in the seventeenth century, would be more difficult still". (quoted in "The Coat of Arms of Wolfson College Oxford" by Dr Jeremy Black The College Record 1989–90).

In 1984, Garter King of Arms declined to ask the Court to rule against the assumption of unauthorised arms by a local authority, doubting whether the precedents would give jurisdiction (A New Dictionary of Heraldry (1987) Stephen Friar p 63).

Hence, although the Law of Arms undoubtedly remains part of the law of England, and although the Court of Chivalry in theory exists as a forum in which it may be enforced, there is difficulty in enforcing the law in practice (a point made in Re Croxon, Croxon v Ferrers [1904] Ch 252, Kekewich J). The absence of a practical remedy for the illegal usurpation of arms in the law of England does not mean that there are no rights infringed, merely that it is not within the jurisdiction of the common law courts to act and that the court that is so empowered does not now sit.

=== Scotland: Court of the Lord Lyon ===
In Scotland, Lord Lyon King of Arms is the judge of the Lyon Court, which has jurisdiction over all heraldic matters. An act of the Scottish parliament in 1592 made the unauthorised use of arms a criminal offence and gave Lyon the responsibility to prosecute such misuse, though in practice this might not be legal today. Unlike the Court of Chivalry, the Court of the Lord Lyon is very much alive, and is fully integrated into the Scottish legal system.

== Arms conferring nobility ==
In England a grant of arms does not ennoble a grantee in itself, but is a recognition of rank or status and, therefore, an authoritative confirmation of it. An armiger (one who has the right to bear arms) is deemed to be of the status of a gentleman, and in England, many of the suits in the Court of Chivalry were decided on that basis. He may of course be of higher rank, as esquire, knight, peer, or prince. Gentlemen who have no higher rank, as well as Esquires, are considered to be Britain's equivalent to untitled nobility on the Continent.

In contrast, a coat of arms in Scotland is often, not without controversy, said to be a fief annoblissant, similar to a Scottish territorial peerage or barony. Under Sir Thomas Innes of Learney (Lord Lyon King of Arms 1945–1969), wording was introduced into every Scottish patent of arms which states that the grantee "and his successors in the same are, amongst all Nobles and in all Places of Honour to be taken, numbered, accounted and received as Nobles in the Noblesse of Scotland". These claims, strongly championed by Innes of Learney himself and by other writers, have now found broad acceptance amongst legal commentators as correctly representing the Law of Arms in Scotland (for example, The Stair Encyclopaedia of Scots Law (vol. 11, p. 548, para. 1613)), but are challenged by others, some of whom are reluctant to place a grant of arms on the same legal plane as a feudal barony or peerage.

In 2008, the so-called nobility clause seen in Scottish grants of arms since the days of Lord Lyon Innes of Learney was dropped and is no longer included in new grants of arms. Nevertheless, CILANE and the Order of Malta consider both English and Scottish grants of arms as constituting hereditary gentility. This means that a person holding arms recognised or granted by one of the two British heraldic authorities would be considered noble whenever a test of nobility is required by an organisation such as a nobility association or an order of chivalry. As official grants of hereditary nobility are very sparse or have been made impossible in most Continental jurisdictions while grants of arms continue in Britain, the British lower nobility, or gentry, remains an open class.

On the European continent, there is a clear difference between noble arms and burgher arms. An official grant of arms by Continental authorities does not confer or prove gentility.

In most countries, scholars agree that a coat of arms is an indication of nobility, but that (in times past) simply assuming a coat of arms did not ennoble the armiger. In certain countries (viz. the Italian states pre-1860), armorial heraldry was not strictly regulated, while titles of nobility were.

As a generality, most nobles, whether titled or not, have coats of arms, hence the widely held perception of heraldry as an aristocratic trapping.

== Assumption of arms ==
While in the continent of Europe assumption of arms has mostly remained free, in some countries arms may not be assumed or changed at will. In particular, there is some basis for the claim that it is unlawful to assume arms in England and Wales without the authority of the Crown. This is the view of the College of Arms and is supported by some dicta in court cases, including In re Berens, [1926] Ch. 596, 605–06, and Manchester Corporation v Manchester Palace of Varieties Ltd, [1955] P. 133 (the only modern decision of the Court of Chivalry). However, there is no holding by a modern court directly on point and, as suggested above, the Court of Chivalry is very unlikely to be convened to hear a case where arms are self-assumed. For cases considering the question but not deciding it, see Austen v. Collins, 54 L.T.R. 903 (Ch. 1886); In re Croxon, [1904] Ch. 252.

However, the assumption of arms has in every age been common, and became particularly so after the College of Arms ceased to obtain warrants to search out the illegal use of armory by roving enquiries known as the Visitations, the last of which took place at the end of the seventeenth century. The interpretation and application of modern legal principles (such as freedom of expression) have also influenced this, and the annual tax on coats of arms was repealed in 1945.

Burke's General Armory (last edition 1884) is said to contain arms attributed to 60,000 families. But it has been calculated that there were only 9,458 armigerous families in 1798 and a total of 8,320 grants of arms made in the 19th century, which implies, albeit on an extremely rough and ready basis, about 40,000 assumptions of arms.
