= Heraldic authority =

Office or institution that deals with heraldry

A heraldic authority is defined as an office or institution which has been established by a reigning monarch or a government to deal with heraldry in the country concerned. It does not include private societies or enterprises which design and/or register coats of arms. Over the centuries, many countries have established heraldic authorities, and several still flourish today.

== Europe ==
=== Azerbaijan ===
- Heraldic Council (2006– ), forming part of the Presidency.

=== Belgium ===
The Council of Heraldry and Vexillology registers non-noble personal and municipal arms in the French Community of Belgium.

- The Council of Nobility (1844–present) – deals with grants arms to the nobility in all of Belgium and municipal arms in the German Speaking Community of Belgium.
- Council of Heraldry and Vexillology (1985–present) – supervises and advises the Government of the French Community regarding registration of non-noble personal, familial and municipal arms within the French Community of Belgium.
- Flemish Heraldic Council (1984–present) – supervises and advises the Flemish Government regarding grants of non-noble personal, official, municipal, and corporate arms within the Flemish Community of Belgium.

=== Burgundy ===
- Toison d'Or King of Arms (1431–?)

=== Croatia ===
- Ministry of Public Administration – Commission for approving the coat-of-arms and flags to the local self-government units

The commission deals only with municipal heraldry and vexillology. It is composed of five members appointed on a four years mandate by the Minister: jurist, heraldist, archivist, historian and visual artist. Pursuant to article 10. Law on the local self-government units, all municipal coats of arms have to be made and blazoned in accordance with heraldic rules. Ministry will issue armorial (Croatian: grbovnica) to municipality in the form of a booklet composed of 8 pages. The Armorial is made in three copies of which one is obtained by : unit of local self-government, Croatian State Archives and the Ministry of Public Administration.

=== Czech Republic ===
- Chamber of Deputies of the Parliament of the Czech Republic – Subcommittee on heraldry and vexillology

The subcommittee deals only with municipal heraldry and vexillology. The grants of arms approved by the committee are signed by the Speaker of the Chamber of Deputies. The Czech Republic has no heraldic authority for personal arms.

=== Denmark ===
- Statens Heraldiske Konsulent (State Heraldic Advisor) (1938– ). The National Archives of Denmark is the State Heraldry Advisor since 1985.

=== Finland ===
- Heraldinen lautakunta (Heraldic Board), founded in 1957, known 1957–88 as Heraldinen toimikunta (Heraldic Committee). It operates as a part of the National Archives of Finland.

=== France ===
- College d'armes (1407–1790)
- Commission nationale d'héraldique (1999–present), operating as part of the National Archives of France.

=== Georgia ===
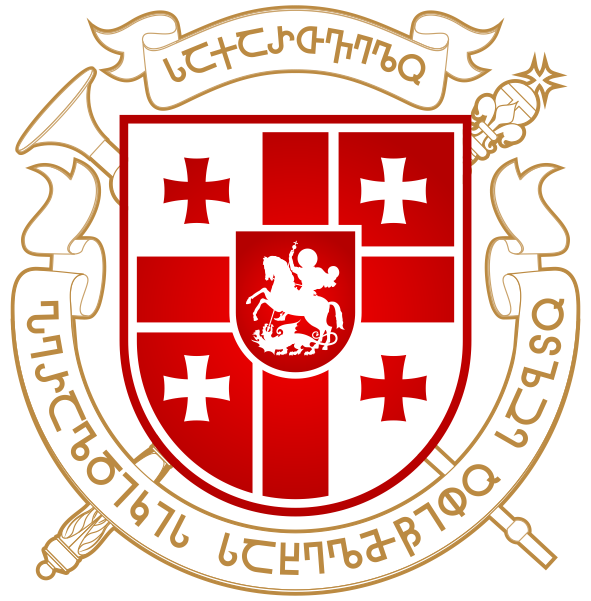
The State Council of Heraldry advises the government of Georgia on all matters related to heraldry.

- State Council of Heraldry (2008–present)

=== Germany ===
Holy Roman Empire

- Reichsherold (Imperial Herald) (1520–?)

Bavaria

- Reichsherold (Royal Herald) (1808–1920)

Prussia

- Oberheroldsamt (1706–1713) – dealt with noble and municipal arms.
- Königlich Preussisches Heroldsamt (Royal Prussian Heraldry Office) (1855–1920)

Saxony

- Kommissariatt für Adelsangelegenheiten (Commission for Noble Affairs) (1902–1920)

=== Hungary ===
- Országos Községi Törzskönyvbizottság (National Municipal Register Committee) (1898–1949)
- Képző és Iparművészeti Lektorátus (Lectorate of Visual and Applied Arts) (1970s–1990)
- Nemzeti Címer Bizottság (National Coat of Arms Committee) (2016– )

=== Ireland ===
- Ulster Office (1552–1943), headed by Ulster King of Arms.
- Genealogical Office (1943– ), headed by the Chief Herald of Ireland and forming part of the National Library of Ireland – grants personal, official, municipal, and corporate arms.

=== Italy ===
- Consulta Araldica (Heraldry Council) (1869–1947)
- Istituto Nazionale del Nastro Azzurro (King Vittorio Emanuele III allowed the Istituto Nazionale to grant heraldic coats of arms to members since 1927; the Istituto was recognized by the Italian Republic in 1966)
- Ufficio Cerimoniale della Presidenza del Consiglio dei Ministri (since 1947)

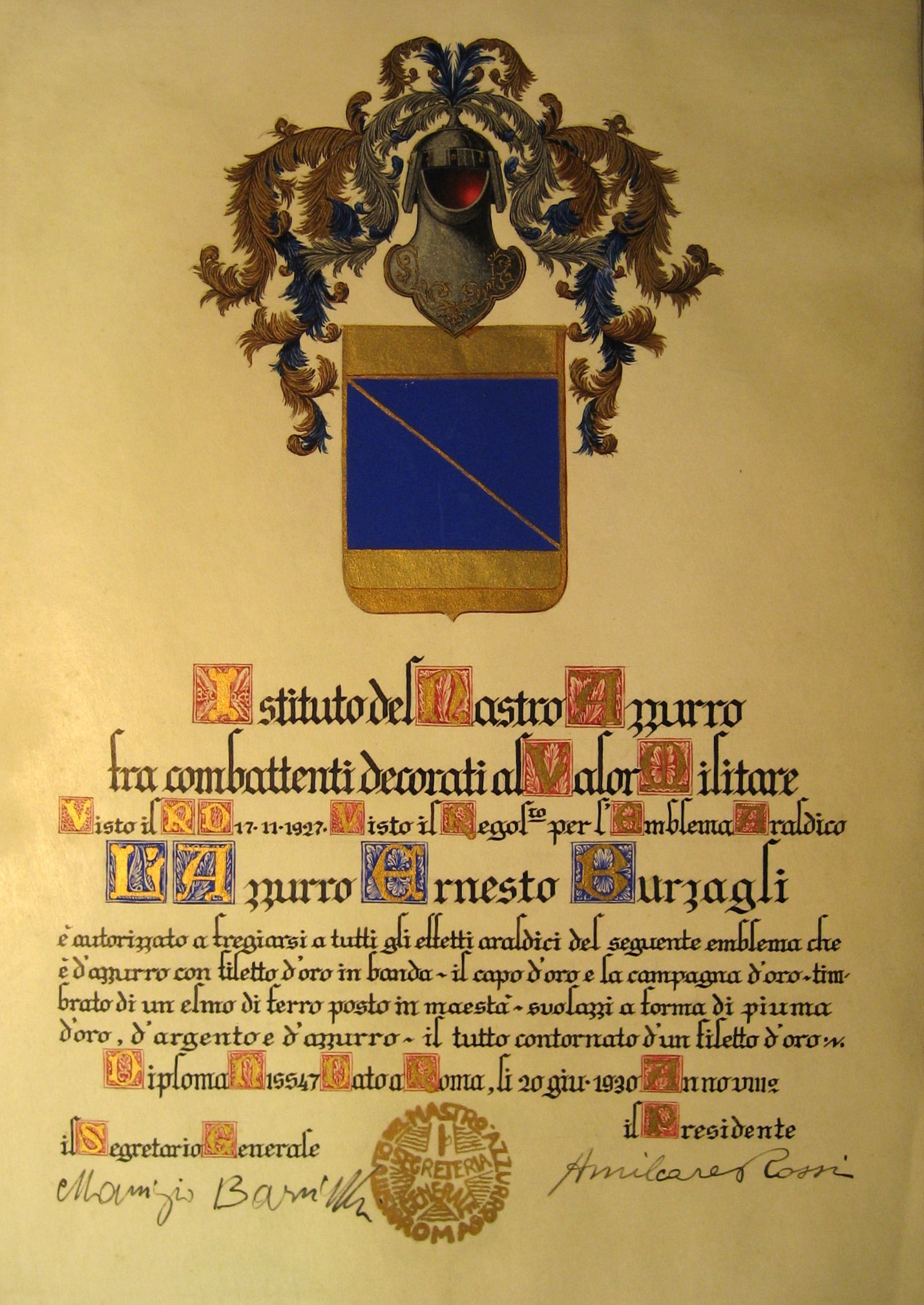
Coat of arms, granted by the Istituto Nazionale del Nastro Azzurro to one of its members, the italian Admiral Ernesto Burzagli. The Nastro Azzurro is one of the main heraldic authorities in Italy.

=== Latvia ===
- State Heraldry Commission (1997– ), forming part of the Presidency – deals with official and municipal arms.

=== Lithuania ===
- Heraldry Commission (1988– ), forming part of the Presidency – deals with official and municipal arms.

=== Luxembourg ===
- Commission héraldique de l'Etat (State Heraldic Commission)

=== Malta ===
- Office of the Chief Herald of Arms of Malta (2019–present), an agency of Heritage Malta — deals with personal, corporate and municipal arms.

(Note : although the office was established in 2019, the necessary legislation was passed only in 2021, and the regulations bringing it into operation were gazetted in 2022. All grants and registrations made between 2019 and 2022 were gazetted in April 2022, to make them official.)

=== Netherlands ===
- Hoge Raad van Adel (High Council of the Nobility) (1814–present) – grants personal arms (to nobles only) and official, military, and municipal arms. Also provides advice regarding arms of members of the royal family.

=== Norway ===
- Ministry of Foreign Affairs – all matters concerning the Coat of arms of Norway (Norwegian: Riksvåpenet = Coat of arms of the realm)

=== Poland ===
- Heraldic Commission (Polish: Komisja Heraldyczna) (1999–)

=== Portugal ===
- Cartório da Nobreza (Nobility Register) (1521–1910) – heraldic authority for the Kingdom of Portugal;
- Comissão de Heráldica da Associação dos Arqueólogos Portugueses (Heraldic Commission of the Association of Portuguese Archeologists) (1930 – ) – heraldic authority for the municipalities of Portugal;
- Gabinete de Heráldica Corporativa (Office for Corporate Heraldry) (1930–1974) – heraldic authority for the corporations (trade unions, guilds, etc.);
- Secção de Heráldica da Direção de Cultura e História Militar (Heraldry Section of the Directorate of Military History and Culture) (1969 – ) – heraldic authority for the Portuguese Army;
- Gabinete de Heráldica Naval (Office for Naval Heraldry) (1972 – ) – heraldic authority for the Portuguese Navy;
- Adjunto de Heráldica do Arquivo Histórico da Força Aérea (Heraldry Deputy of the Air Force Historical Archive) (1977 – ) – heraldic authority for the Portuguese Air Force;
- Gabinete de Heráldica Autárquica (Office for Municipal Heraldry) (foreseen in 1991, but never created) – heraldic authority for the municipalities of Portugal.

=== Romania ===
- Comisia Consultativă Heraldică (The Consultative Heraldic Committee) (1921–1940) – founded in 1921 as the heraldic authority in the Kingdom of Romania and it dealt with state, civic, ecclesiastical, and scholastic coats of arms;
- Comisia Națională de Heraldică, Genealogie și Sigilografie (The National Committee of Heraldry, Genealogy, and Sigillography) (1971–present) – founded in 1971 as Comisia de Heraldică, Genealogie și Sigilografie (The Committee of Heraldry, Genealogy, and Sigillography) as the heraldic authority in the Socialist Republic of Romania; since 1992, it is the heraldic authority of Romania and it deals with civic and personal heraldry;

=== Russia ===
- Office of Heraldry (1722–1917), headed by the Master Herald – granted personal, official, and municipal arms.
- Heraldic Council of the President of the Russian Federation or State Heraldry Service (1992– ), headed by the Master Herald and forming part of the President's Office.

=== Slovakia ===
- Heraldic Commission
- Heraldic Registry of the Slovak Republic (part of Ministry of Interior) (Note: See the registry:)

=== Spain ===
- Real Academia de la Historia (Royal Academy of History). For Asturias, Cantabria, Castilla–La Mancha, La Rioja and Balearic Islands.
- Consejo Asesor de Heráldica y Simbología de Aragón (Advisory Council of Heraldry and Symbology of Aragon). For Aragon.
- Sociedad de Estudios Vascos/Eusko Ikaskuntza (Basque Studies Society). For Basque Country.
- Instituto de Estudios Canarios (Institute for Canary Studies). For Canary Islands.
- Cronistas de Armas de Castilla y León (Recorders of Arms), established in 1496. For provinces of Castile and León.
- Institut d'Estudis Catalans (Institute for Catalan Studies). For Catalonia.
- Comisión de Heráldica de Galicia (Galician Heraldry Commission). For Galicia.
- Real Academia Matritense de Heráldica y Genealogía (Royal Madrilenian Academy of Heraldry and Genealogy), together with the Real Academia de la Historia, for Madrid.
- Real Academia Alfonso X el Sabio (Royal Academy Alfonso X the Wise). For the Region of Murcia.
- Consell Tècnic d'Heràldica i Vexil·logia (Technical Council of Heraldry and Vexillology). For Valencian Community.

=== Sweden ===
- Riksheraldiker (National Herald) (1734–1953)
- Statens Heraldiska Nämnd (State Heraldry Office) (1953– ), headed by a State Herald, and forming part of the Royal Archives. registered with the Swedish Patent and Registration Office (Patent- och registreringsverket or PRV). Only official arms (royal and civic arms) are handled. Burgher and commoner arms are less strictly controlled and may be recognized by publication in the annual Scandinavian Roll of Arms.

=== United Kingdom ===
England and Wales

The College of Arms is the office regulating heraldry for England, Wales and Northern Ireland. It was founded in 1484 by King Richard III, and is a private corporate body which is delegated heraldic authority by the British monarch.

- College of Arms (1484– ), headed by the Garter Principal King of Arms, under the general jurisdiction of the Earl Marshal – grants personal, municipal, and corporate arms, also records pedigrees and genealogies.

Northern Ireland

- Until 1943, Northern Ireland came under the Ulster Office; since then, it has fallen under the College of Arms part of the jurisdiction of the Norroy and Ulster King of Arms which also covers the counties of England and Wales North of the River Trent.

Scotland

- Court of the Lord Lyon, headed by the Lord Lyon (c. 1399?– ) – grants personal, municipal, and corporate arms; it is illegal to bear arms in Scotland unless they have been granted or recorded by the Lord Lyon.

The Lord Lyon King of Arms is an official with responsibility for regulating heraldry in Scotland, issuing new grants of arms and serving as the judge of the Court of the Lord Lyon, the oldest heraldic court in the world that is still in daily operation.

== Africa ==
=== Kenya ===
- College of Arms (Kenya) (1968– ), headed by a Registrar, and forming part of the Attorney-General's Office – grants and registers personal, municipal, and corporate coats of arms. It was established by the College of Arms Act of 1968.

=== South Africa ===
- Department of the Interior (1935–1959) – inter alia registered the arms of associations and institutions, as "badges".
- Provincial administrations (1949–1963) – inter alia registered the arms of municipalities in their respective provinces.
- Department of Education, Arts & Sciences (1959–1963) – inter alia registered the arms of associations and institutions, as "badges".
- Bureau of Heraldry (1963– ), headed by the National Herald (formerly State Herald), and forming part of the National Archives & Records Service – registers personal, official, military, municipal, and corporate arms. Together with the Heraldry Council, it forms part of the National Archives and Records Service (formerly called the State Archives Service), which is currently under the authority of the Minister of Arts & Culture.

The Heraldry Act 1962, which governs the Bureau of Heraldry, has not been changed to replace "State herald" with "National Herald". Announcements in the Government Gazette of South Africa still use "State Herald".

=== Zambia ===
- Colours Control Board (1958– ) – inter alia registers the arms of associations and institutions, as "badges".

=== Zimbabwe ===
- Registrar of Names, Uniforms, Badges and Heraldic Representations (1971– ), forming part of the Patents Office – registers official, municipal, corporate, and personal arms.

== Asia ==
=== Philippines ===
- Philippine Heraldry Committee (1940–1972) – government coat of arms, seals, and other symbols of state
- National Historical Commission of the Philippines (1972–) – absorbed responsibilities of the Philippine Heraldry Committee after the Reorganization Act of 1972. Final approval of works required from the Office of the President

== North America ==
Canadian Heraldic Authority

The Institute of Heraldry

=== Canada ===
- Canadian Heraldic Authority (1988– ), headed by the Chief Herald of Canada and forming part of the Governor General's office– grants personal, corporate, governmental, military and other organizational arms.

=== United States ===
- Carolina Herald was an English herald responsible for heraldry in Carolina in early and mid 18th Century colonial times.
- The Institute of Heraldry, U.S. Army, is the organization responsible for furnishing heraldic services to the President of the United States and all federal government agencies.

== Oceania ==
=== New Zealand ===
- New Zealand Herald Extraordinary (1978– ) in the Governor-General's Household – represents the English College of Arms.
