= Georges Dansaert =

Belgian jurist (1876–1960)

Georges Dansaert PB
- Coat of arms of the Dansaert family
- Born: 21 January 1876; City of Brussels
- Died: 16 November 1960 (aged 84); Ixelles
- Occupations: Historian, poet, writer, genealogist, heraldist, lawyer

Georges Dansaert PB, (21 January 1876 – 16 November 1960) was a Belgian lawyer, historian, poet, heraldist, genealogist, and writer from Brussels. In 1938, he received the Hercule-Catenacci prize from the Académie Française along with Baudouin de Lannoy for their book Jean de Lannoy le Bâtisseur, 1410–1493. He descended from the Houses of Sleeus and Sweerts of the Seven Noble Houses of Brussels. The Dansaert family, now extinct, was an old and prominent ship-owning family from Brussels. He was a director of the Association Royale des Descendants des Lignages de Bruxelles (Seven Noble Houses of Brussels organization). He was a donat of the Sovereign Military Order of Malta.

== Publications ==
- Le lieutenant-général des Armées du Roi d'Espagne, Messire Guillaume René, comte de Baillencourt, baron d'Antigny, Brussels, J. Van Acker, 1920;
- Les Dansaert dits "Les Enfants du Canal" par un vieux Bruxellois. Une page d'histoire à propos du Canal de Willebroeck, Brussels : Imprimerie J. Vanden Acker, (1921)
- Preuves, titres et documents de la Maison de Baillencourt, preface by the Count H. d'Ursel (1925);
- Un jurisconsulte et prince de l'Eglise au XVIIe siècle, Monseigneur de Baillencourt, évêque de Bruges. preface by Baron P. Verhaegen, Brussels, A. Dewit, (1927)
- Les anciens vice-rois d'origine belge et divers autres, preface by the Duke of Ursel (1928);
- Les grands-drossards ou sénéchaux du pays et duché de Brabant (1928);
- Le Blason de la Maison de Lannoy à travers les siècles, Bruxelles, A. Dewit, preface by the Count d'Arschot-Schoonhoven (1928)
- Un Fils de maréchal, le prince Louis de Ligne, preface by the Baron de Troostenbergh (1929);
- Les grands-veneurs de Brabant, preface by the Duchess d'Uzès (1930);
- Frédéric de Merode en 1830, preface by Valentin Brifaut, (1930)
- Les conséquences curieuses d'un duel, preface by the Prince-Duke of Bauffremont- Courtenay (1930);
- Celui qu'on appelait le Beau Lannoy (1930);
- Histoire de l’Ordre souverain et militaire de Saint-Jean de Jérusalem, dit de Rhodes ou de Malte en Belgique, Preface by H.I. the Prince A. de Ligne (1932);
- La « Pelote » ou une amitié amoureuse du prince Charles de Lorraine (1933);
- Faire son chemin, Histoire de la famille Desandrouin;
- Une singularité héraldique, published in Le Parchemin, OGHB, (1937);
- Guillaume de Croy-Chièvres, dit le Sage, préface du duc de La Force et de M. Brouwers, archiviste honoraire de l'État;
- Elisabeth-Pauline, comtesse de Lauraguais, preface by Mr. Laloire, state archivist;
- Le vrai visage de La Fayette, preface by Viscount Ch. Terlinden;
- Les Baillencourt, prévôts de Mons, introduction by Count R. de la Barre d'Erquelinnes;
- L'Armorial des roys-d'armes A. F. Jaerens et Ch. Beydaels (1945);
- Nouvel armorial belge, ancien et moderne, précédé de l'art héraldique et ses diverses applications, Éditions J. Moorthamers, Brussels, 1949, 426 p.
- Histoire de l'ordre de Malte en Belgique
- Les Gouverneurs des Anciens Pays-Bas catholiques
- Une belle figure de la femme aimante au XVIe siècle, Sabine de Bavière, comtesse Lamoral d'Egmont. preface by M. Cuvelier, general archivist of Belgium.

As co-author :

- Fernand de Ryckman de Betz, Georges Dansaert et l'abbé Thibaut de Maisières, De Nederlandsche Boekhandel, 1948, 394;
- Armorial belge du bibliophile, co-author with the Viscount de Jonghe d'Ardoye and J. Havenith, 1930.

== See also ==
- Association des Descendants des Lignages de Bruxelles
- Belgian heraldry
