= Belgian heraldry =

Belgian Heraldry

Versions
- Coat of Arms of Belgium

- Arms of Brabant
- Motto: L'Union Fait La Force
- Other elements: Black; Yellow; Red

Belgian heraldry is the form of coats of arms and other heraldic bearings and insignia used in the Kingdom of Belgium and the Belgian colonial empire but also in the historical territories that make up modern-day Belgium.

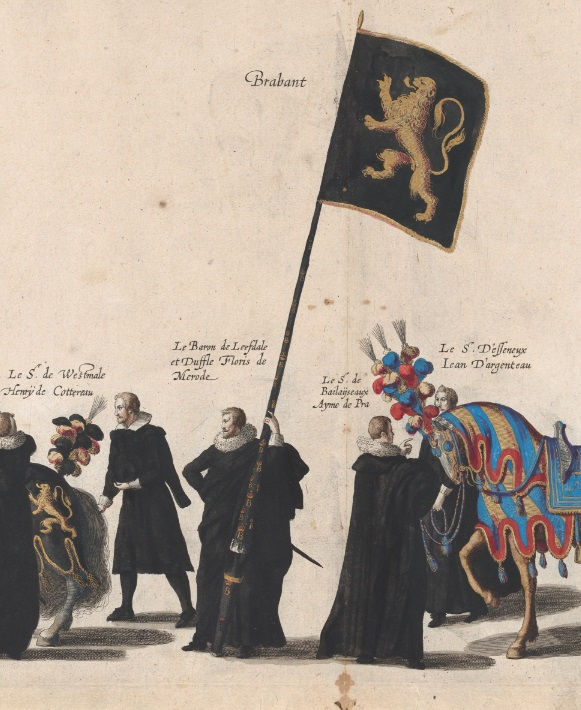
Brabantian Lion carried by Floris de Merode, Baron of Leefdael during the Funeral of Albert VII. This emblem of the dukes of Brabant is now the coat of arms of Belgium.

Today, coats of arms in Belgium are regulated and granted by different bodies depending on the nature, status, and location of the armiger.

== Coats of Arms of Belgium ==
coat of arms of Belgium (Great)

coat of arms of Belgium (Middle)

coat of arms of Belgium (state/small)

coat of arms of Belgium (shield)

== Historical Coats of Arms of Belgium ==
Coat of arms of Charlemagne (800–888)

Coat of arms of the County of Flanders (863–1794)

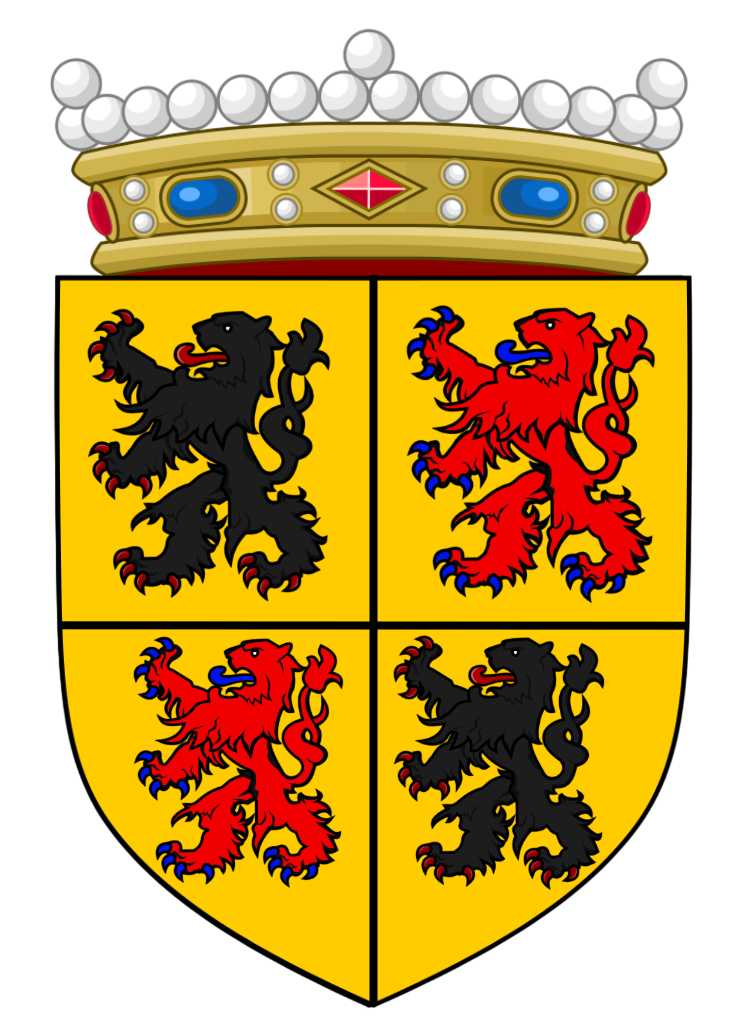
Coat of arms of the County of Hainaut (900–1477)

Coat of Arms of Lower Lotharingia (959–1190)

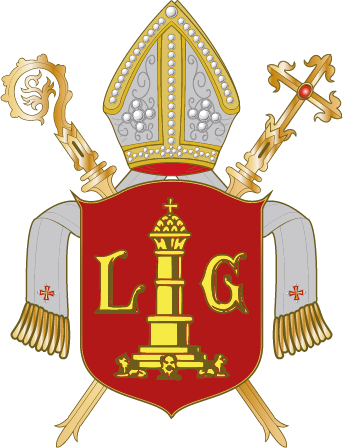
Coat of arms of the Prince-Bishopric of Liège (980–1790)

Coat of arms of the County of Namur (981–1797)

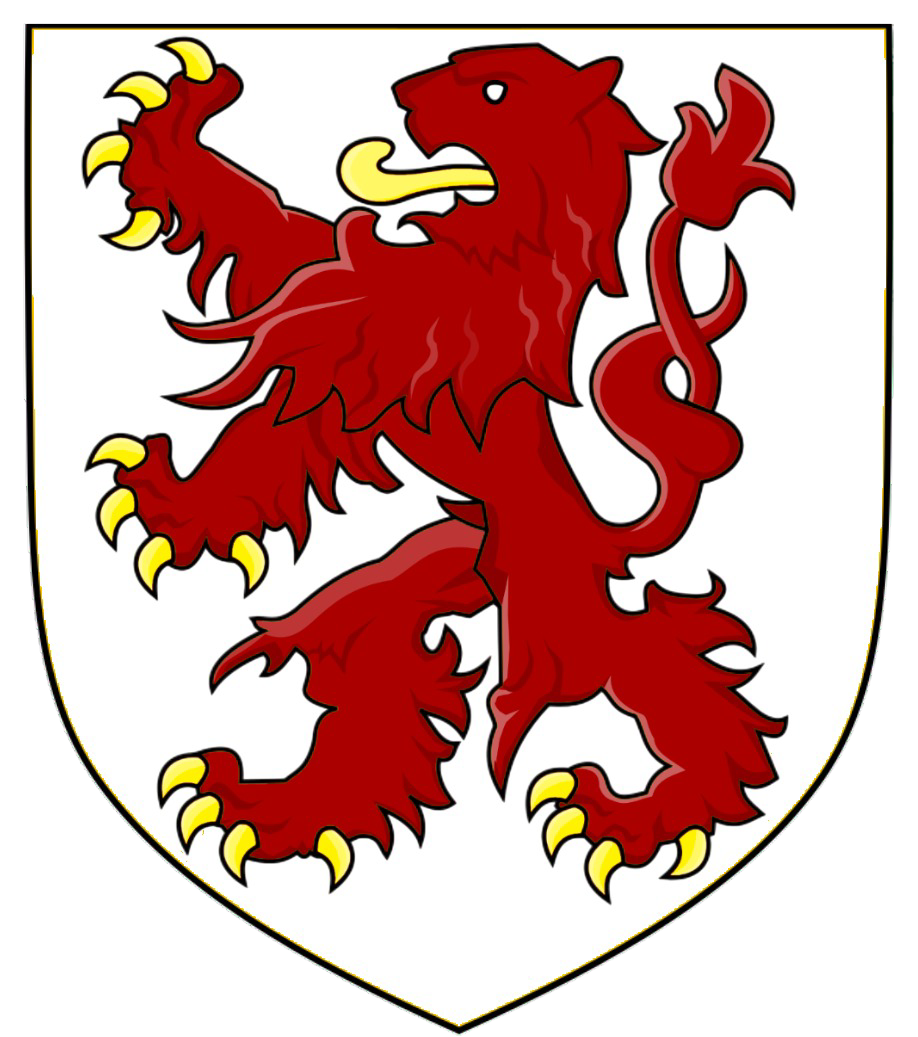
Coat of arms of the Duchy of Limburg (1065–1797)

Coat of arms of the Duchy of Brabant (1183–1794)

Coat of arms of the Burgundian State (1384–1482)

Coat of arms of The Habsburg Netherlands (1482–1797)

Coat of arms of the Spanish Netherlands (1556–1714)

Coat of arms of the Austrian Netherlands (1714–1797)

Coat of arms of United Belgian States (1789–1790)

Coat of arms of The United Kingdom of the Netherlands (1815–1830)

Coat of arms of Belgium (1830–now)

== Belgian coat of arms information ==
Coat of arms of the Kingdom of Belgium (greater)
Adopted 17 March 1837 Coronet Royal Crown of Belgium Crest A helmet with raised visor or Escutcheon Sable, a lion rampant or, armed and langued Gules Supporters Two lions guardant proper each supporting a lance Gules point or with two National Flags of Belgium (Tierced per pale Sable, or and Gules). Compartment Underneath the compartment is placed the ribbon Gules with two stripes Sable charged with the motto Motto L'union fait la force Orders The grand collar of the Order of Leopold Other elements Two crossed sceptres (a hand of justice and a lion) or behind a shield. The whole is placed on a mantle Gules with ermine lining, fringes and tassels Or and ensigned with the Royal Crown of Belgium. Above the mantle rise banners with the arms of the nine provinces that constituted Belgium in 1837. They are (from dexter to sinister) Antwerp, West Flanders, East Flanders, Liège, Brabant, Hainaut, Limburg, Luxembourg and Namur Other versions

Coat of arms of the Kingdom of Belgium (lesser)
Adopted 17 March 1837 Coronet Royal Crown of Belgium Escutcheon Sable, a lion rampant or, armed and langued Gules Compartment Letters gold on a ribbon gules edged sable with the motto Motto L'union fait la force Orders The grand collar of the Order of Leopold Other elements Two sceptres or placed in saltire, to the dexter, to the hand of justice, and to the sinister, to the lion of the shield

== Elements of the Belgian heraldry ==
=== Leo Belgicus (Belgian lion) ===
The Leo Belgicus, Belgian lion of Brabantion lion is used on the official Coat of arms of Belgium. It's derived from the flag Brabant and the county of Brabant which contains a yellow lion with a red tongue and red gules on a black background. This symbolism was first used in the Brabantian revolution (1789–1790) And was later reused in the Belgian revolution (1830–1831) And later became the official symbol and animal of Belgium.

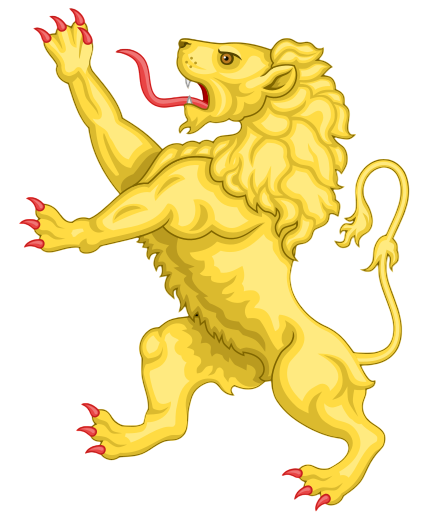
Leo Belgicus (Lion used on the coat of arms of Belgium)

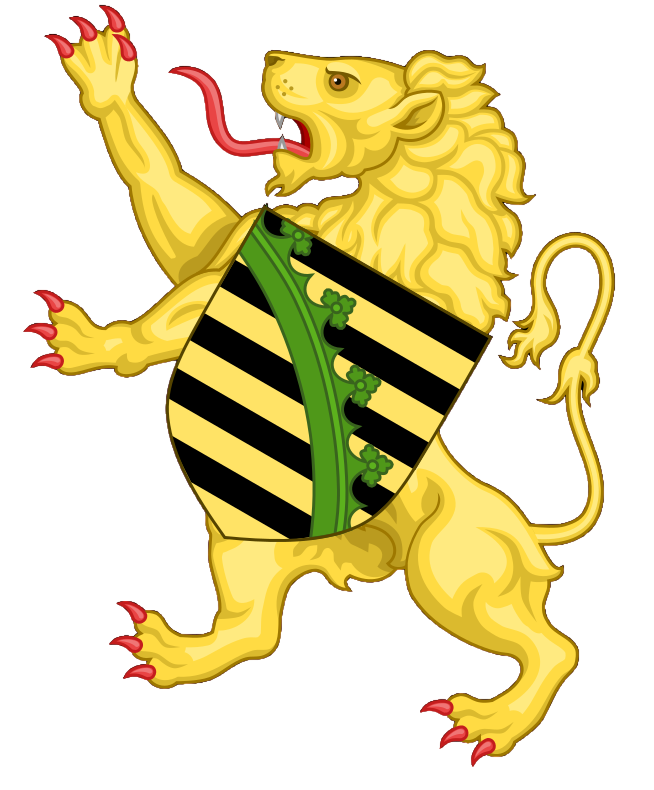
Leo Belgicus with the coat of arms of the Royal house of Saxe-Coburg and Gotha.

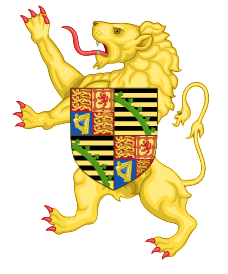
Leo Belgicus used by King Leopold I of Belgium on his personal coat of arms

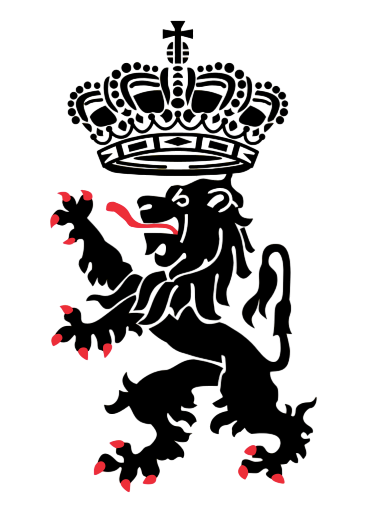
Leo Belgicus used by the Belgian (federal) government

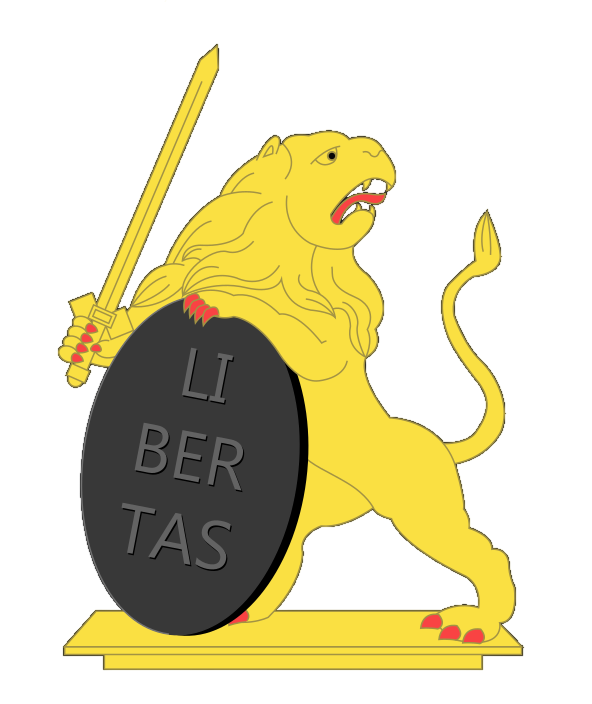
Leo Belgicus used by the United Belgian States

Leo Belgicus of the Duchy of Brabant and Belgicism

=== Helmets ===
In Belgium, barred helms are most commonly used, and are not reserved for the nobility like in some jurisdictions. They most often have gold bars, as well as a gold collar and trim. They are often lined and attached to the escutcheon with a shield strap

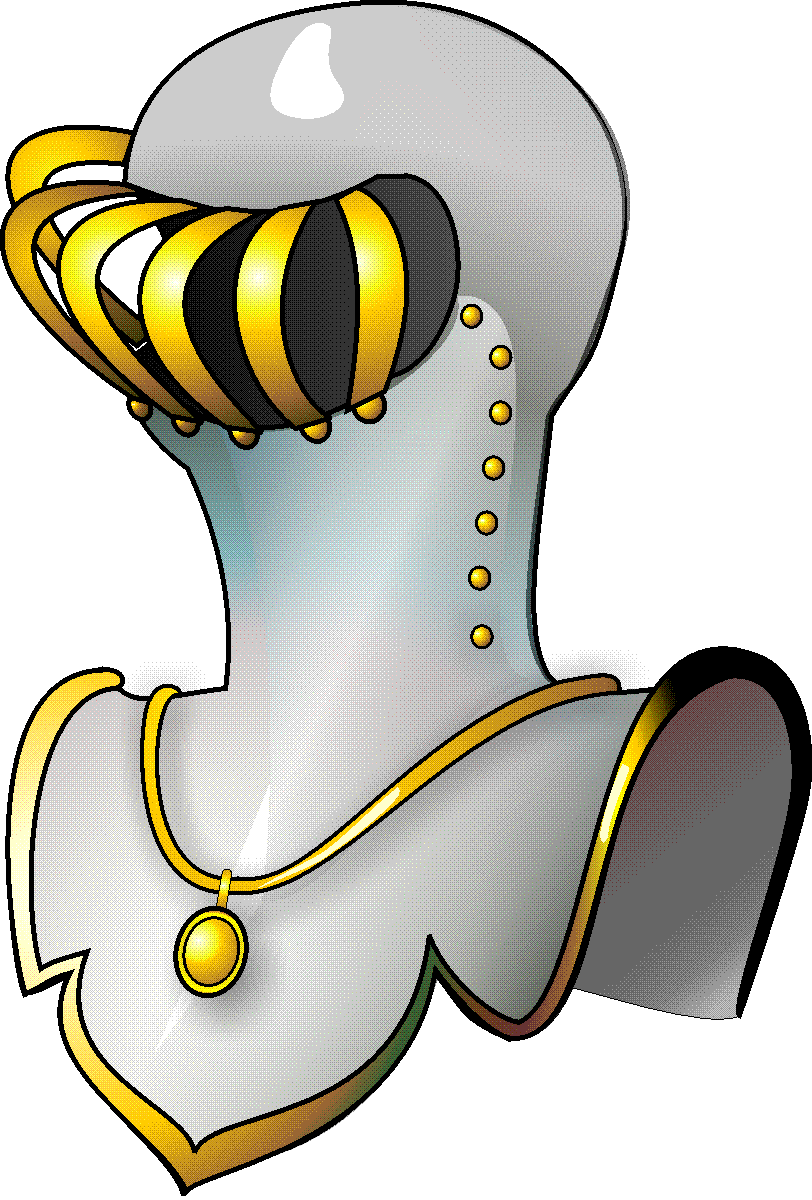
Barred helm with gold bars, collar, and trim.

All silver barred helm.

Jousting or tourney helmet.

=== Belgian Royal crowns (Coronets rankings) ===
King	Crown prince	Prince	Duke	Marquess	Count	Viscount	Baron	Knight	Squire

== Coats of Arms of regions, communities and language areas, Provinces and Municipalities ==
=== Regions ===
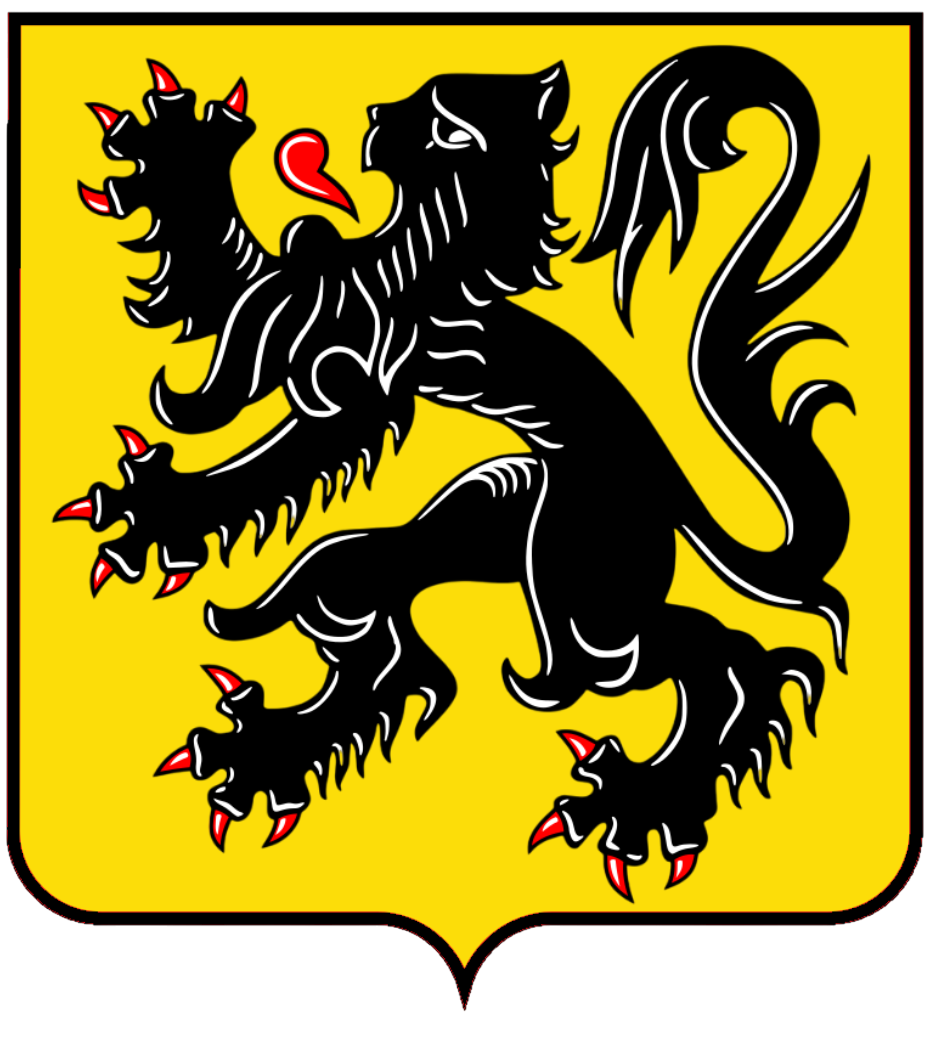
Coat of arms of Flanders

Coat of arms of Wallonia

Coat of arms of Brussels

=== Communities and Language areas ===
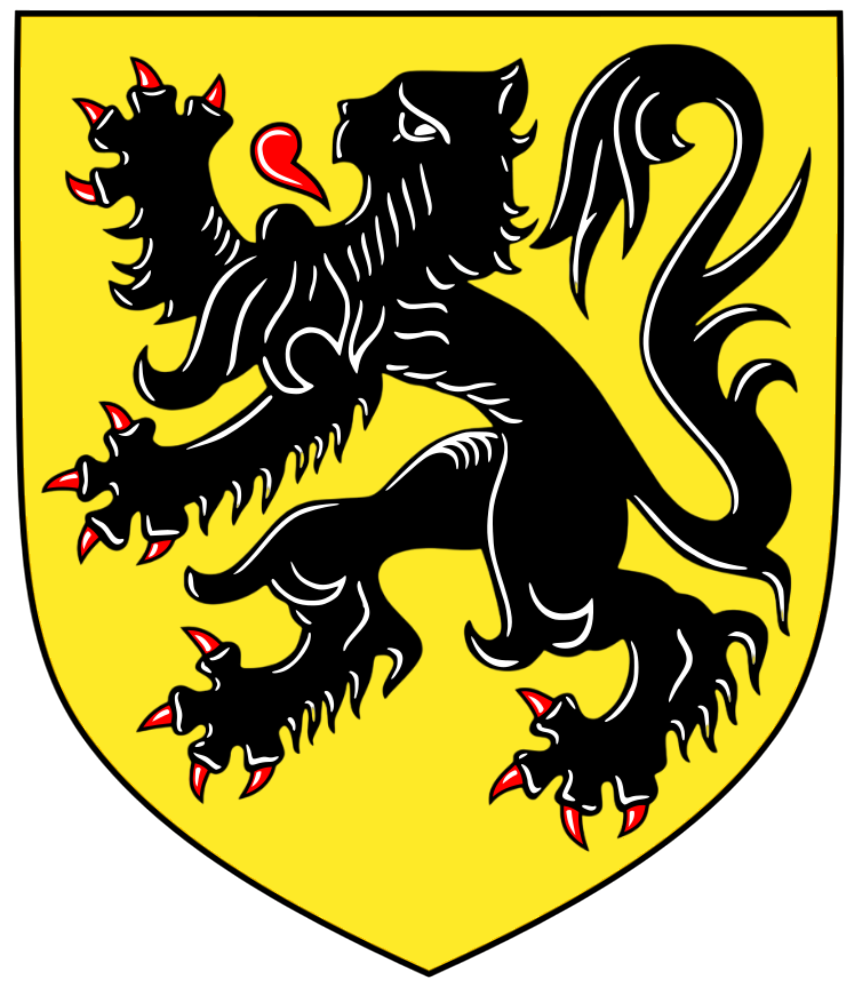
Coat of arms of the Flemish Community

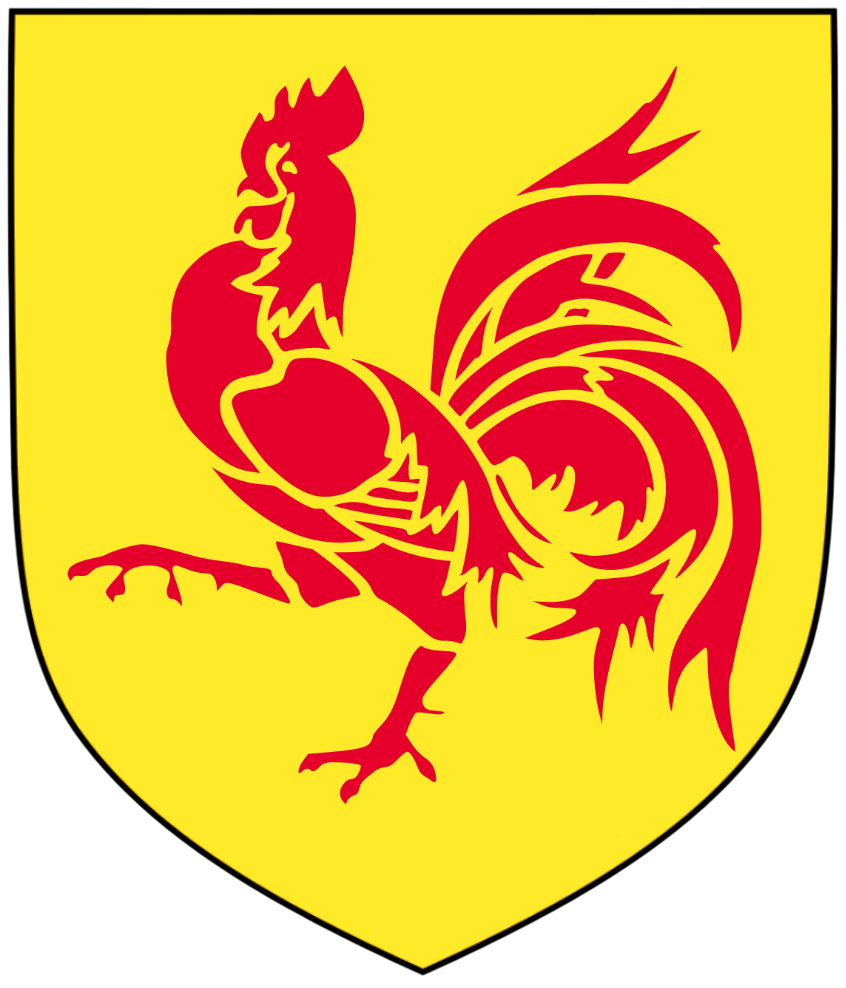
Coat of arms of the French Community

Coat of arms of the German speaking community

=== Provinces ===
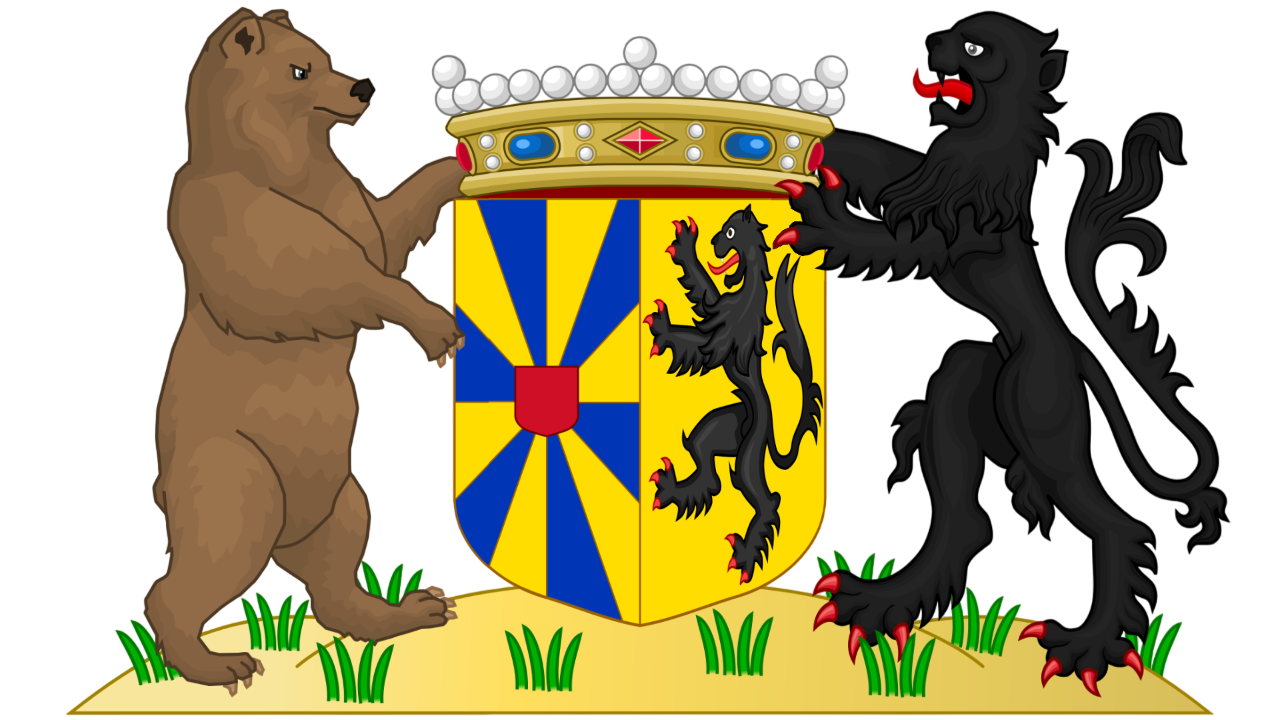
Coat of arms of West-Flanders

Coat of arms of East-Flanders

Coat of arms of Antwerp

Coat of arms of Limburg

Coat of arms of Flemish Brabant

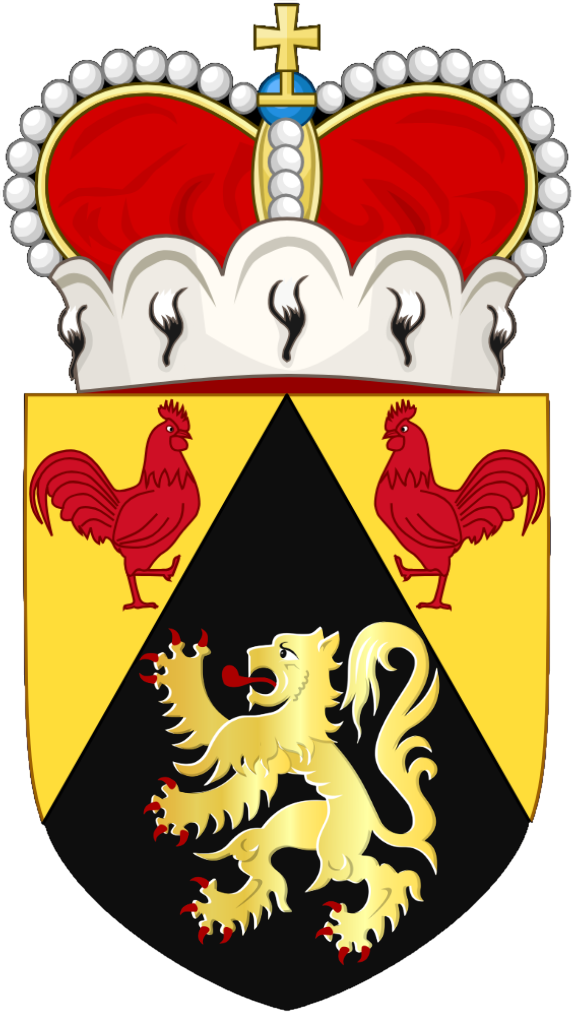
Coat of arms of Walloon Brabant

Coat of arms of Hainaut

Coat of arms of Namur

Coat of arms of Liège

Coat of arms of Luxembourg

== Other Belgian heraldry ==
=== Colonial heraldry ===
Coat of arms of the Congo Free State (1885–1908)

Coat of arms of the Belgian Congo (1908–1960)

Coat of arms of Belgian Ruanda-Urundi (1918–1962)

Coat of arms of the Lado Enclave (1894–1910)

Seal of the Belgian concession of Tianjin (1902–1931)

=== Other ===
Coat of arms of The Neutral Moresnet (1816–1920)

Coat of arms of the Belgian Ostend Company(1722–1731)

Coat of arms of the Flemish Heraldic Council (Flemish Community)

Coat of arms of the Council of Heraldry and Vexillology (French Community)

== Belgian Royal heraldry ==
The coats of arms of the Belgian royal family is currently regulated by a Royal Decree published on 19 July 2019 and signed on the same day, by King Philippe. This decree also reinstated the Saxonian escutcheon in all the royal versions of the family's coat of arms. The reinstatement of the shield of Saxe-Coburg-Gotha into the royal arms occurred shortly after the visit of King Philippe and Queen Mathilde to the ancestral Friedenstein Castle. The king also added translations of the motto into the three official languages of Belgium, to reflect his wish "to be the King of the whole Kingdom and of all Belgians". The latest royal decree therefore reverses previous changes made to the Royal versions of the coat arms which removed the armorial bearings of Saxony during the First World War.

=== Coats of arms of the (former) Belgian King ===
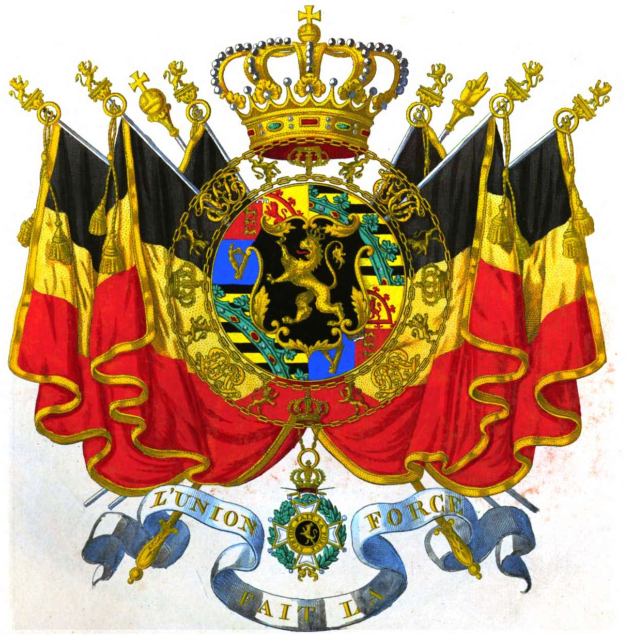
Coat of Arms of King Leopold I of Belgium (1831-1846)

Coat of Arms of King Leopold I of Belgium (1846-1865)

Coat of Arms of King Leopold II of Belgium (1865-1902)

Coat of arms of King Albert I, Leopold III, Baudouin and Albert II of Belgium (1902-2019)

Coat of arms of King Philippe of Belgium (2019-now)

=== Coat of arms of the Belgian royal family ===
Coat of arms of the King of Belgians, King Philippe

Coat of arms of the Belgian royal house (greater)

Coat of arms of the Belgian royal house (middle)

Coat of arms of the Belgian royal house (small)

Coat of arms of the Prince of Belgium

Coat of arms of the Princess of Belgium

Coat of arms of a prince of the Royal house

Coat of arms of a princess of the Royal house

Coat of arms of the prince and Duke of Brabant

Coat of arms of the princess and Duchess of Brabant (Princes Elisabeth)

=== Coat of arms of the Royal couple ===
Coat of arms of the Current King Philippe and Queen Mathilde

Coat of arms of the former King Albert II and Queen Paola

Coat of arms of the former King Baudouin and Queen Fabiola

Coat of arms of the former King Leopold III and Queen Astrid

Coat of arms of the former King Albert I and Queen Elisabeth

Coat of arms of the former king Leopold II and Queen Marie

Coat of arms of the first king of the Belgians Leopold I and Queen Louise

== Individuals and families ==
Like civic arms, arms of non-noble individuals and families (in the form of family associations) are regulated by the competent council of the community in question. These are the Council of Heraldry and Vexillology for the French Community and the Flemish Heraldic Council for the Flemish Community. Today, both councils grant a helm with torse and mantling as well as a motto as additaments of the shield. The additaments reserved for the nobility, such as crowned helmets (i.e. crest coronets) and rank crowns (coronets), supporters, banners and battle cries, mantles and pavilions, are prohibited.

Before that, the Genealogical and Heraldic Office of Belgium recorded the arms of persons and families.

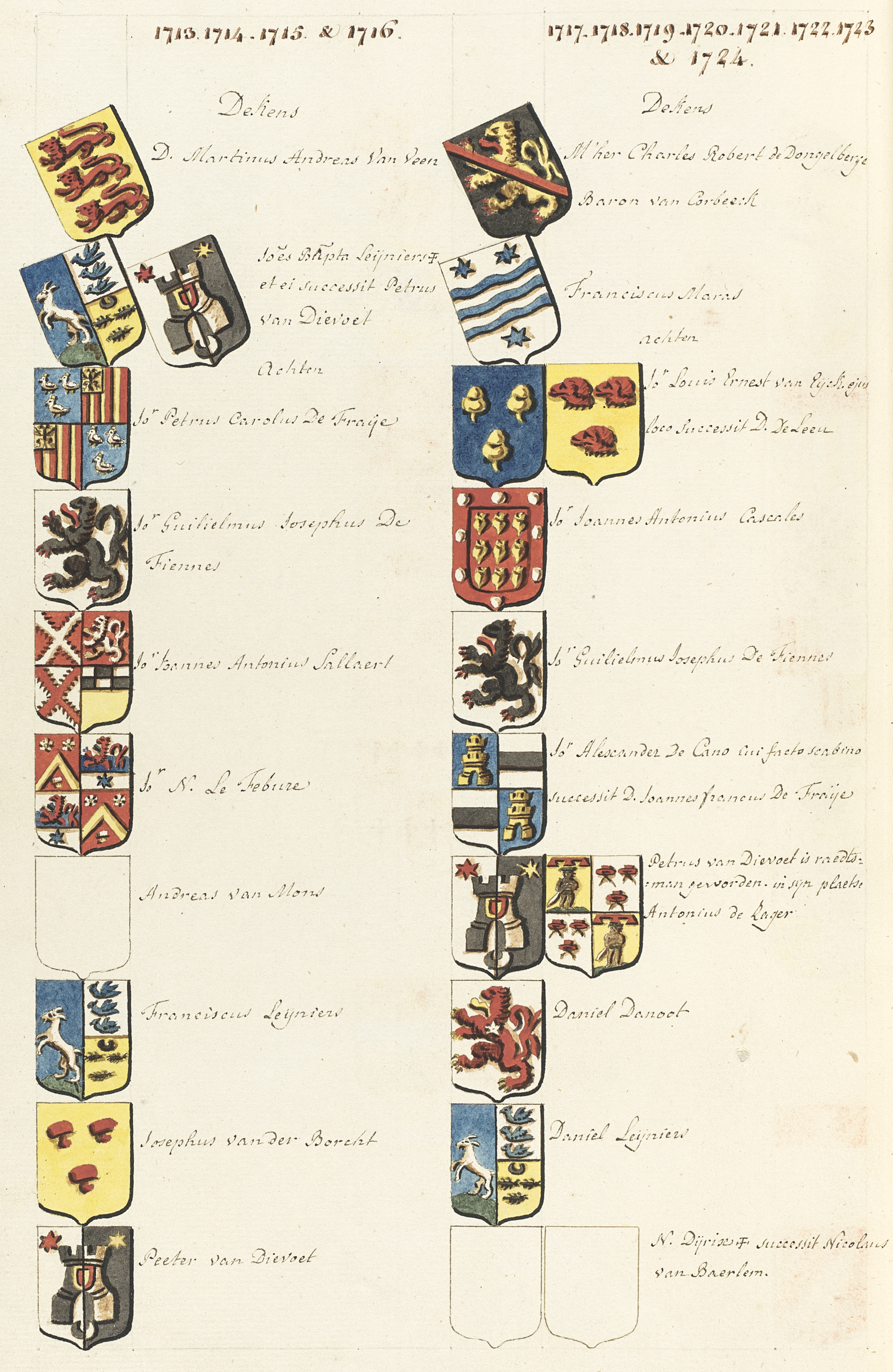
18th century roll of arms of members of the Drapery Court of Brussels.

Coat of arms of the de Muyser Lantwyck family.

Coat of arms of the de Brabant family [fr]

Coat of arms of the Vander Borcht family [fr]

Coat of arms of the Dewandre family [fr]

Arms of the Poot family

Arms of the Van Dievoet family

== Nobility ==
Arms of the Belgian nobility are regulated by the Council of Nobility.

Coat of arms of the Counts d'Udekem d'Acoz

Coat of arms of the de Lannoy family

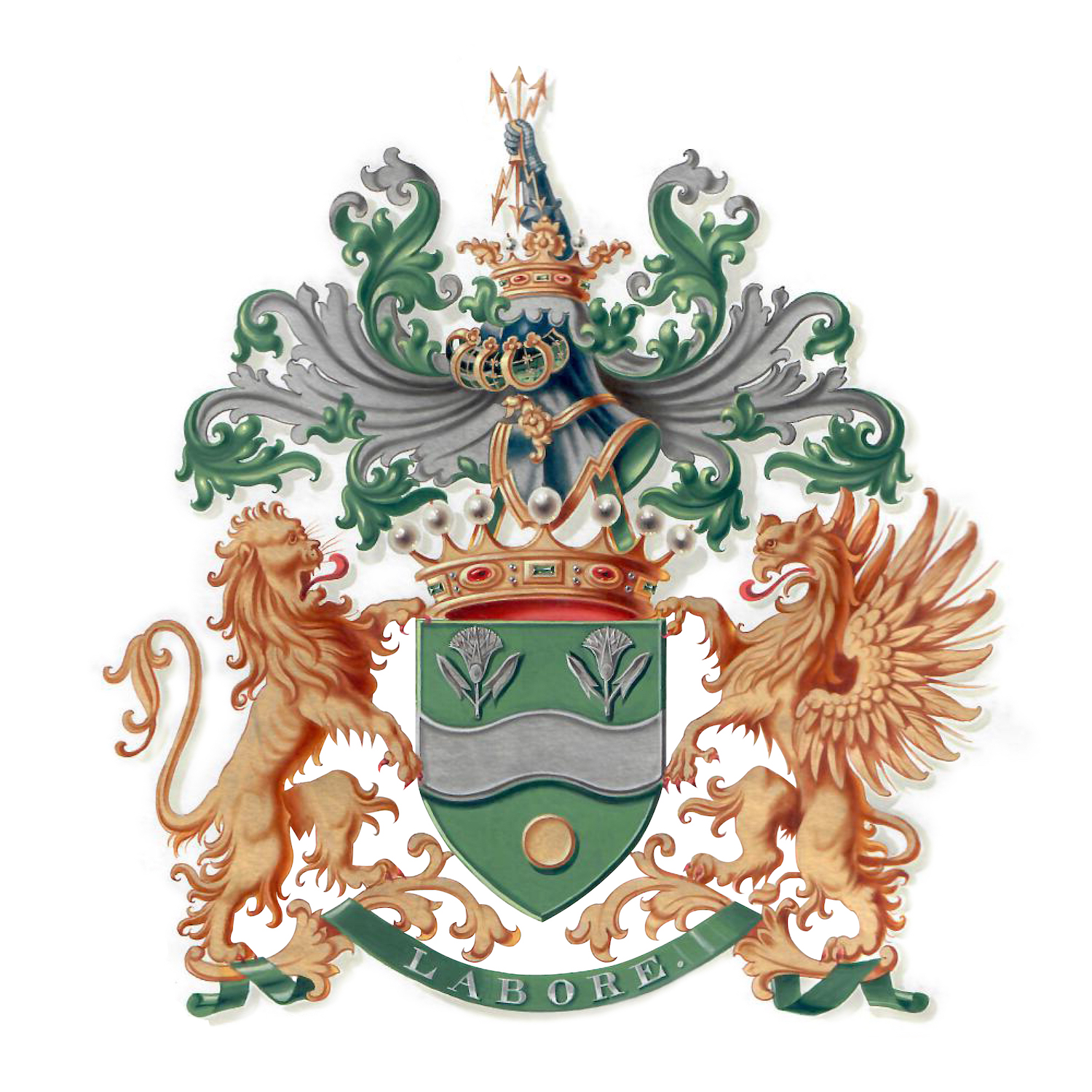
Coat of arms of the Empain Barons

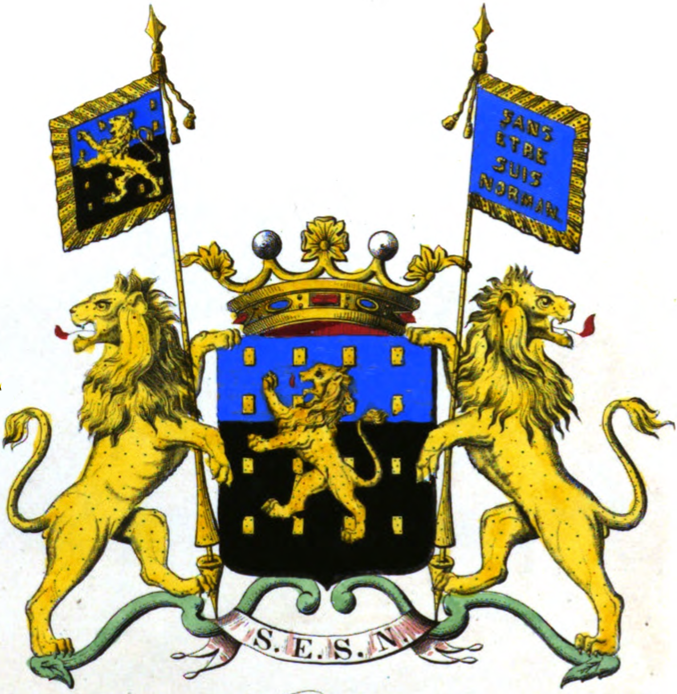
Coat of arms of the Norman et d'Audenhove family.

Arms of the Coart family

Arms of the house of Merode

== Terminology ==
Like England, France and some other countries' heraldry, achievements of arms are usually blazoned in a specialized jargon.

Tinctures									
English	Or	Argent	Azure	Gules	Vert	Purpure	Sable	Ermine	Vair
French	Or	Argent	Azur	Gueules	Sinople	Pourpre	Sable	Hermine	Vair
Dutch	Goud/Or (Geel/Goud)	Zilver/Argent (Grijs/Zilver)	Azuur/Lazuur (Blauw)	Keel (Rood)	Sinopel (Groen)	Purper (Paars)	Sabel (Zwart)	Hermelijn	Vair

Ordinaries								
English	Pale	Fess	Bend	Bend sinister	Cross	Saltire	Chevron	Bordure
French	Pal	Fasce	Bande	Barre	Croix	Sautoir	Chevron	Bordure
Dutch	Paal	Dwarsbalk	Schuinbalk	Linker schuinbalk or baar	Kruis	Schuinkruis or andrieskruis	Keper	Schildzoom

Division of the field						
English	Party per fess	Party per pale	Party per bend	Party per bend sinister	Quarterly	Party per saltire
French	Coupé	Parti	Tranché	Taillé	Écartelé	En sautoir
Dutch	Doorsneden	Gedeeld	Geschuind	Linksgeschuind	Gevierendeeld (in vier kwartieren)	Schuin gevierendeeld

== See also ==
- Coat of Arms of Belgium
- National symbols of Belgium
- Leo Belgicus
- Burgher arms

== Bibliography ==
=== Heraldic laws and customs in Belgium ===
- L. Arendt; A. De Ridder (1896). La législation héraldique de la Belgique (in French). Brussels.
- chevalier Braas, La législation nobiliaire en Belgique, Brussels, 1960.
- Claude Chaussier, Le droit ancien et actuel des armoiries non nobles en Belgique, Brussels: Éditions du S.C.G.D., 1980.
- Jean-Baptiste Christyn, Jurisprudentia Heroica, Brussels, 1668 and 1689.
- Georges Dansaert, ″L'Art Héraldique et ses diverses applications″, in: Nouvel armorial belge, Brussels, 1949, pp. 113–119.
- Georges Dansaert, ″Du droit de propriété des armoiries et de ses conséquences″, in: Nouvel armorial belge, Brussels, 1949, pp. 7–110.
- Lucien Fourez, Le droit héraldique dans les Pays-Bas catholiques, Brussels, 1932.
- Octave le Maire, "Diplômes d'armoiries bourgeoises conférées par le roi Guillaume", in: L'Intermédiaire des généalogistes, Brussels, n° 91, 1961, pp. 34–36.
- Pierre Nisot, Le droit des armoiries. Essai de systématisation et de construction théorique, préface de M. C. Terlinden, professeur à l'Université de Louvain, membre du Conseil héraldique de Belgique, membre de la Commission royale d'histoire, Brussels : P. Dyckmans, 1924.
- Jean Scohier, L'Estat et comportement des armes, Brussels, 1597.
- PANTENS, Chr., Le cri en héraldique, in: Le Parchemin, 58, 1993, n° 285, p. 171-184.
- VAN ORMELINGEN, J.-J., De toekenning van het adellijk wapen, in: Le Droit nobiliaire et le Conseil héraldique (1844–1994), Brussels, 1994, p. 139-169.
- DE MOFFARTS D'HOUCHENÉE, baron St., L'écartelé, mode de rappel, dans les armoiries concédées, d'armoiries d'une autre famille, in: Le Droit nobiliaire et le Conseil héraldique (1844–1994), Brussels, 1994, p. 221-234.
- HOUTART, J.-F. (ed.), Florilegium Heraldicae Belgicae (Fédération généalogique et héraldique de Belgique, Cahier 4), Brussels, 2004.
- VAN ORMELINGEN, J.-J., Enregistrement officiel d'armoiries en Belgique, in: A. VANDEWALLE, L. VIAENE-AWOUTERS & L. DUERLOO (eds.), Genealogica & Heraldica. Handelingen van het XXVI Internationaal Congres voor Genealogische en Heraldische Wetenschappen, Brussel/Bruxelles, 2006, p. 427-436 (cf. VAN ORMELINGEN, J.-J., L'enregistrement officiel des armoiries en Belgique, in: Bulletin de l'Association de la noblesse du Royaume de Belgique, n° 246, avril 2006, p. 3-14).
- Jules Bosmans, Traité d'héraldique belge, 1890.

=== Armorials ===
==== Individuals and families ====
- P. Bohet et H. Willems, Armorial belge, Brussels, 1965.
- Damien Breuls de Tiecken, Armorial bruxellois, Brussels, 2009.
- Georges Dansaert, Armorial belge du bibliophile (same with viscount de Jonghe d'Ardoye and J. Havenith), Brussels, 1930.
- Georges Dansaert, Nouvel armorial belge, ancien et moderne, précédé de l'art héraldique et ses diverses applications, Brussels : Éditions J. Moorthamers, 1949.
- Georges de Crayencour, Dictionnaire Héraldique, tous les termes et figures du blason, Brussels : G. de Crayencour, 1974 (first edition).
- Armorial héraldique vivante, in: Le Parchemin, Genealogical and Heraldic Office of Belgium, 2003.
- Jan van Helmont, Dictionnaire de Renesse. Lexique héraldique illustré, Louvain, 1994.
- Jean-Paul Springael, Armoiries de personnes physiques et d'association familiale en communauté française, edited by the direction of the Patrimoine culturel
- Carnet Mondain
- État présent de la noblesse belge [fr; nl]

==== Municipalities ====
- Lieve Viaene-Awouters and Ernest Warlop, Armoiries communales en Belgique, Communes wallonnes, bruxelloises et germanophones, 2002, 2 volumes.
