= Council of Heraldry and Vexillology =

- Conseil d’héraldique et de vexillologie
- Coat of arms of the Council of Heraldry and Vexillology
- Predecessor: Genealogical and Heraldic Office of Belgium
- Formation: 1985
- Type: Heraldic authority
- Region served: French Community of Belgium
- Official language: French
- President: François-Xavier GEUBEL
- Parent organization: Government of the French Community of Belgium
- Website: Council of Heraldry and Vexillology

The Council of Heraldry and Vexillology (French: Conseil d’héraldique et de vexillologie) is the Heraldic authority for the French-speaking Community of Belgium. It is the institution that advises the Government of the French-speaking Community on all matters concerning civic, personal, and familial arms and flags. Grants of arms from the Council are published in the Belgian official journal.

== Purpose ==
This institution was created in 1985 through a decree by the French Community of Belgium. Its first purpose was to give the French Community its arms, to recognise the arms, seals and flags of cities and municipalities (communes) issued from fusions and to publish from its work, an armorial of the French Community of Belgium.

After this armorial was published in 2002, the council was charged in 2010 to give to the government opinions and advice regarding anything concerning arms of physical persons, families and family associations and their registry. This mission was previously the role of the Royal Belgian Genealogical and Heraldic Office.

Heraldry

Coat of arms of Walloon Brabant, incorporating the arms of the historical Duchy of Brabant and Wallonia's rooster. Granted on 2 January 1995 by the Council.

Coat of arms of the city of Mouscron, recognised on 18 December 1991 by the Council.

The coat of arms of the municipality of Uccle.

The arms of the Dewandre family were registered by the Council on 12 January 2013
Vexillology

Flag of Wallonia

== Other Heraldic authorities in Belgium ==
The Flemish Heraldic Council has a similar purpose in the Flemish Community and the Council of Nobility (est. 1844) grants arms to the nobility in all of Belgium.

== Publications ==
=== Personal armorials ===
- Armoiries de personnes physiques et d’association familiale en Communauté française. 2012-2013, Jean-Paul Springael, 2014, 221 pages. ISBN 978-2-930624-09-9

=== Municipal armorials ===
- Armoiries communales en Belgique. Communes wallonnes, bruxelloises et germanophones, Philippe de Bounam de Ryckholt, Christophe de Fossa, Albert Derbaix, Jean-Marie Duvosquel, Roger Harmignies, Christiane Pantens, Pierre Philippart de Foy, and Andrée Scufflaire; illustrations by Luc Onclin et Rudy Demotte. - Brussels : Dexia Banque, 2002. - 2 volumes. - ISBN 2-87193-294-8

== Composition of the Council ==
Composition of the Council of Heraldry and Vexillology
Adrien Dupont	Expert
Albert Derbaix	Expert
Jean-Paul Springael	Expert
Bertrand Maus de Rolley	Representative from ORUA
Cédric Pauwels	Expert, jurist, and heraldic artist.
François-Xavier Geubel	Expert and president
Jean Nyst	Representative from CDH
Louis-Donat Casterman	Representative from MR
Michel Lupant	Representative from ECOLO

== See also ==
- Belgian heraldry
- Royal Belgian Genealogical and Heraldic Office
- Burgher arms

=== Other heraldic authorities ===
==== Belgium ====
- Council of Nobility
- Flemish Heraldic Council

==== Rest of the world ====
- College of Arms (England, Wales, Northern Ireland)
- Lord Lyon (Scotland)
- Chief Herald of Ireland
- Canadian Heraldic Authority
- Bureau of Heraldry (South Africa)
