= Burgher arms =

Coats of arms of non-nobles

The Council of Heraldry and Vexillology supervises the granting and recording of non-noble arms in the French Community of Belgium.

Burgher arms or commoners' arms, called Bürgerwappen in German, are coats of arms used by commoners, particularly the wealthy merchant class (burghers) in continental Europe since the Middle Ages and are distinct from the arms of the nobility.

In some European countries, certain armorial bearings, i.e. the figures and devices displayed upon a coat of arms, were traditionally restricted to a particular social class (usually the nobility), e.g. the use of supporters in Great Britain, tinctures in Portugal or coronets in Sweden. Notwithstanding, in most countries outside the United Kingdom, any individual, family and community has usually been free to adopt arms and use them as they please, provided they refrain from wrongfully assuming the preexisting arms of another. In addition to burghers, peasants sometimes made use of this tradition. Arms of the clergy are classified as ecclesiastical heraldry.

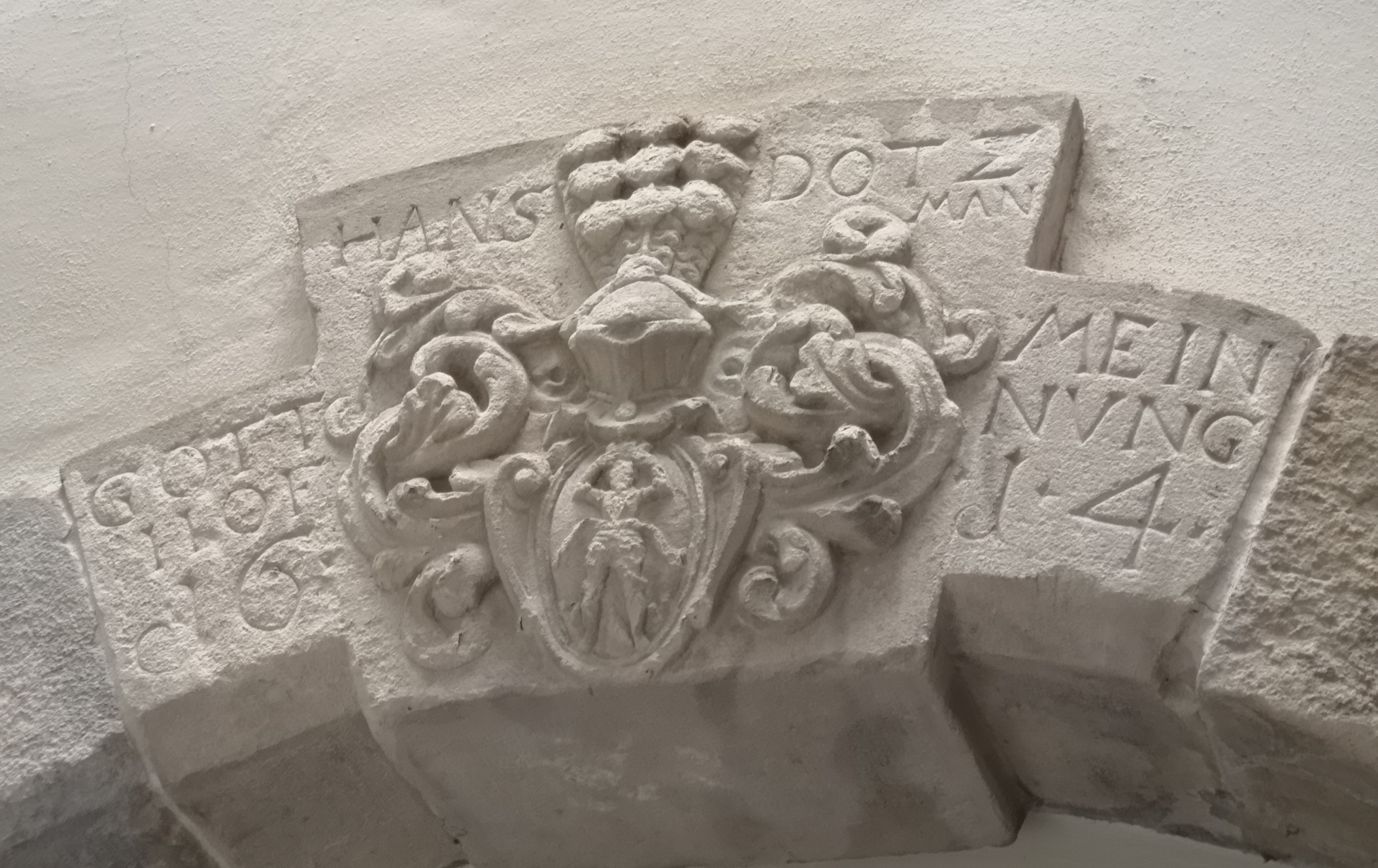
A sculptured burgher arms (Hans Dotzman) with a motto (Gott mein hofnung) on an archway in Bozen, 1614

Use of coats of arms by burghers and artisans began during the 13th century and in the 14th century some peasants took to using arms. The arms of burghers bore a far wider variety of charges than the arms of nobility like everyday objects, and particularly tools. House marks are another type charges usually only used in burgher arms. Most widespread burgher heraldry was and still is found in Belgium, Germany, Switzerland and in the Netherlands. In the latter only a small percentage of the existing arms belong to the nobility.

Crest-coronets in burgher arms are correct only if the arms were granted by a sovereign and the coronet is explicitly mentioned in the grant.

== By country ==
=== Belgium ===
Burghers arms, such as those of the bourgeois of Brussels, were, and remain, common in Belgium and were granted or assumed except during the French Revolutionary period and subsequent republic.

Men admitted to the Seven Noble Houses of Brussels, many of whom were not noble, members of the Guilds of Brussels, and of the Brussels Bourgeoisie, were also granted or assumed arms.

Today, the Council of Heraldry and Vexillology for the French Community and the Flemish Heraldic Council for the Flemish Community grant a helm with torse, crest, and mantling as well as a motto as external ornaments of the shield. The additaments reserved for the nobility, such as crowned helmets and rank crowns, supporters and supports, banners and battle cries, mantles and pavilions, are prohibited.

Examples of Belgian burgher arms:

Arms of the de Keghel family, Bourgeois of Brussels until the 16th century.

Arms of the Pipenpoy family, an old Patrician family of Brussels.

Arms of the Dewandre family, originally from Liège.

Arms of the Poelaert family, burghers of Brussels.

Arms of the Van der Meulen family

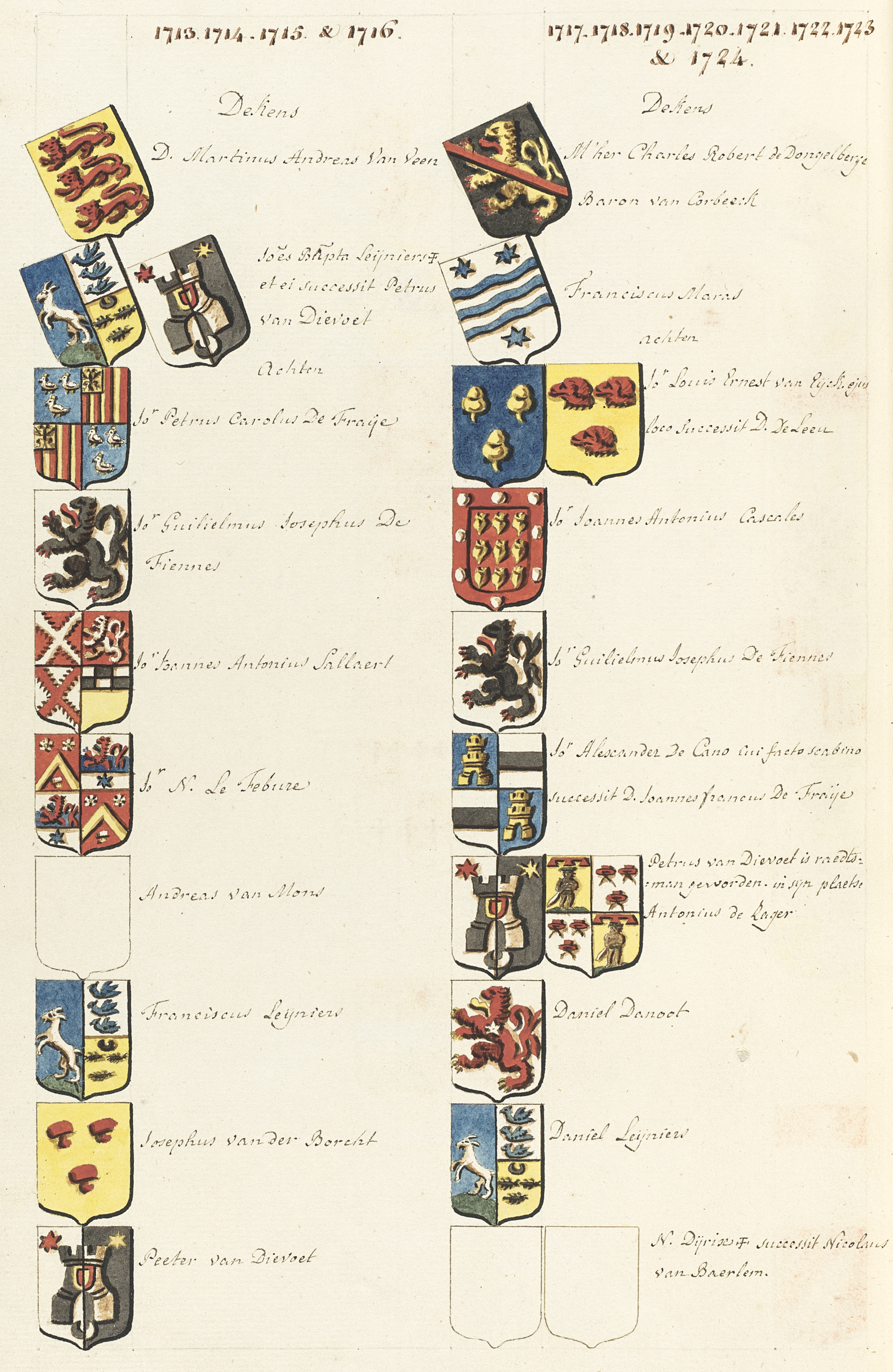
Roll of arms of the Drapery Court of Brussels, some of which are burgher arms.

=== France ===
Burgher arms[fr] were common in France prior to the French Revolution, which was hostile to heraldry. At the end of the 17th century, an attempt was made to list all arms in an armorial in order to increase tax revenue. When the attempt failed, in order to force people to pay tax, arms were given to many burghers who had never had them. These arms were never used by their recipients. In France burgher arms are not supposed to have a helmet.

Examples of French burgher arms:

Coat of arms of the Bordes family

Coat of arms of the Courmes family

Coat of arms of the Martinot family, famous clockmaker family of Paris.

Coat of arms of the Berlier de Vauplane family (Provence) [fr]

Coat of arms of the Baduel d'Oustrac family [fr].

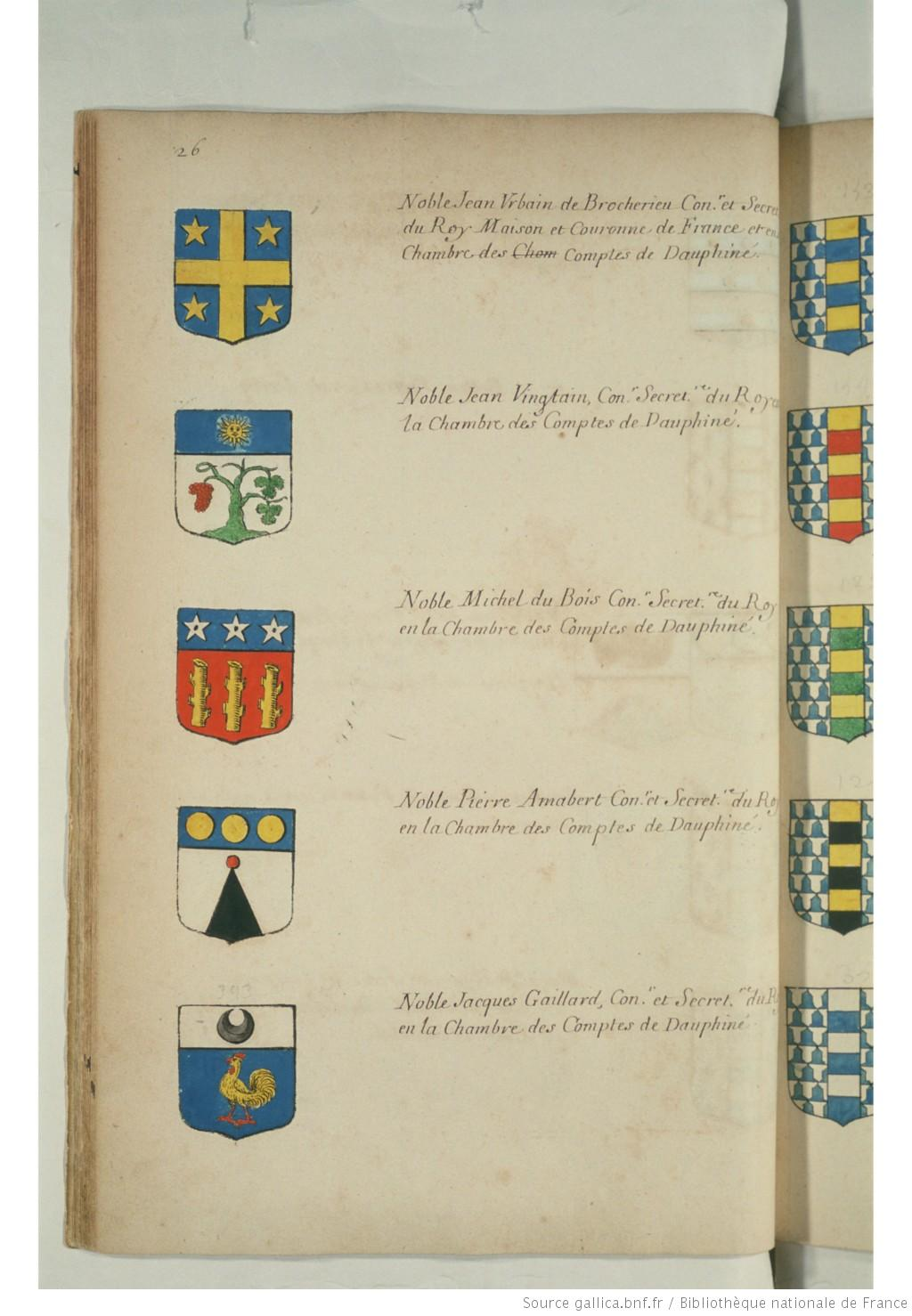
Armorial général 1696, some of which are burgher arms.

=== Germany ===
Although assumption of arms always remained free, the emperors of the Holy Roman Empire since Charles IV began to grant arms without raising people to nobiliary status. In the 15th century the authority to grant arms was delegated to “Counts Palatine of the Imperial Court” (German: Hofpfalzgrafen), who from then on also granted arms to burghers. This was regarded as luxury everyone was not able to afford.

The tilting helmet was prescribed for arms of non-nobles, while the barred helmet was restricted by the imperial chancellery to the nobility as upholders of the tradition of tourneying. This privilege was also shared by certain people who enjoyed the same standing as the nobility, e.g. those who had a doctor's title in law or theology. Custom of the use of the barred helmet was also followed by city patricians. Although the rule of the use of the tilting helmet by burghers was not always obeyed, it has still become the norm in many countries of the German-Nordic heraldic tradition, e.g. in Swedish heraldry.

After the fall of the Holy Roman Empire, arms were no longer granted to burghers except in the Kingdom of Saxony, where such grants continued from 1911 until 1918. Elsewhere burgher arms were assumed. Such family heraldry is still alive in Germany and burgher arms are protected by law.

Examples of German burgher arms:

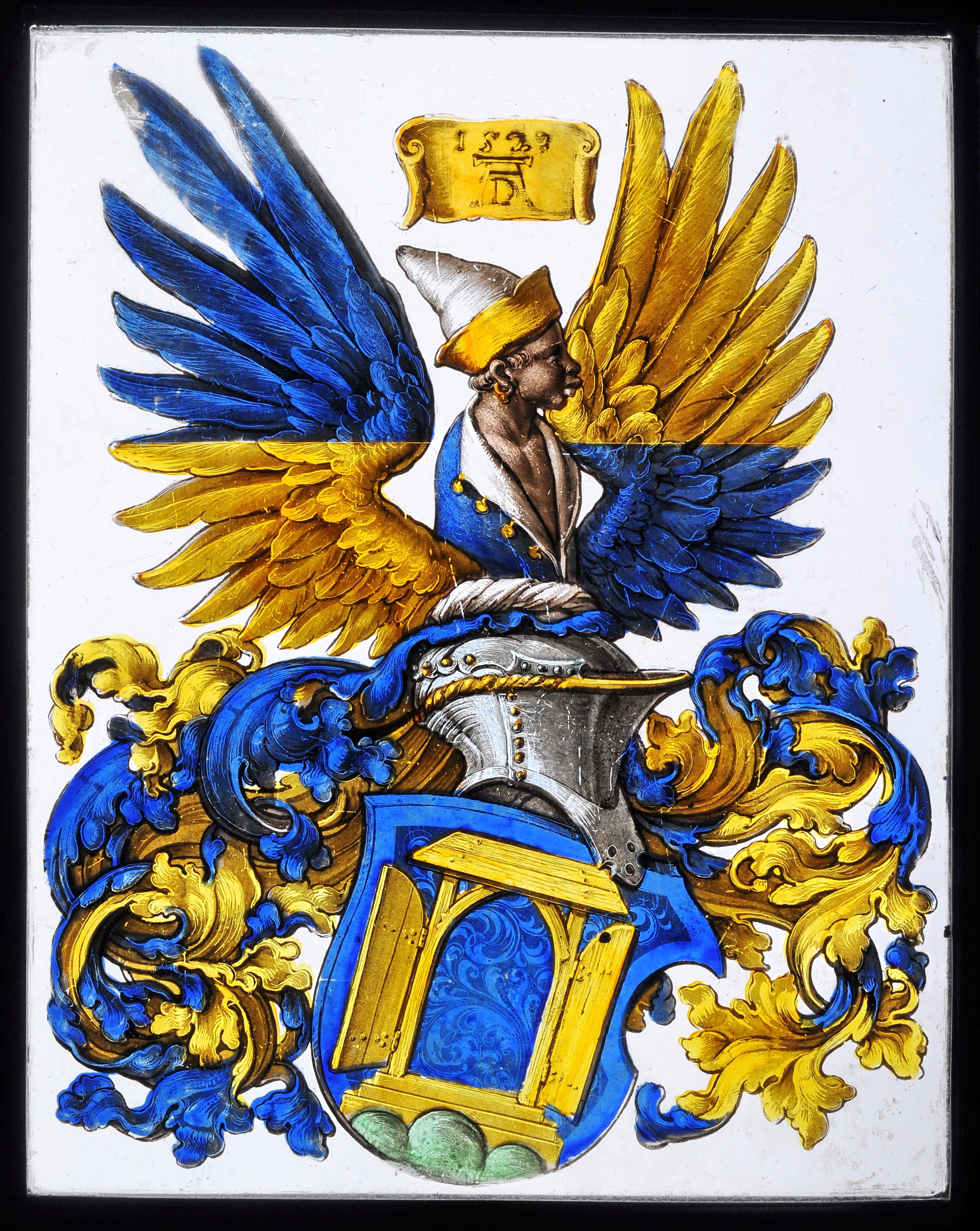
Canting arms of the German painter Albrecht Dürer (1471–1528)

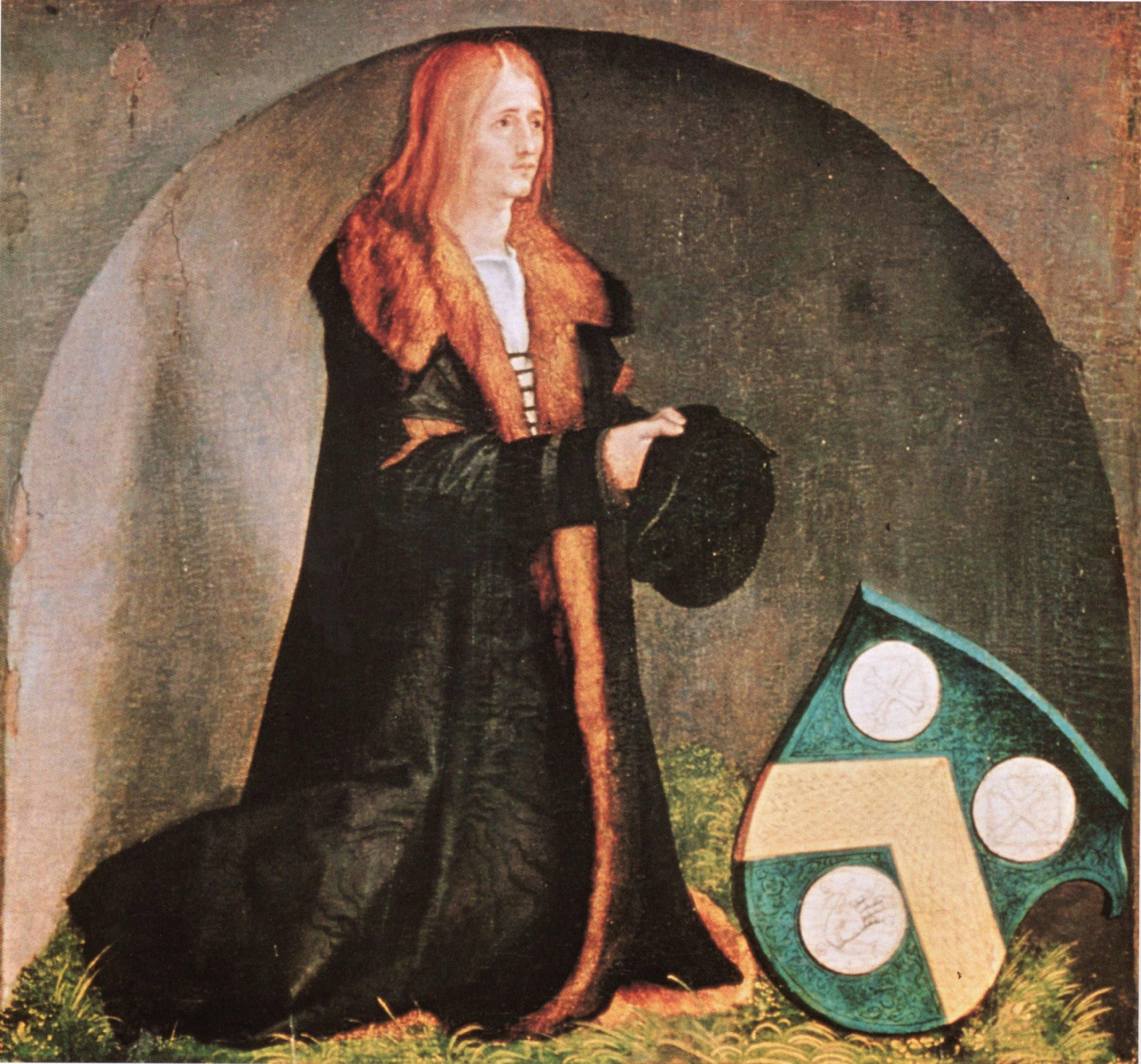
Arms of Jakob Heller from the Heller Altarpiece by Albrecht Dürer

=== Portugal ===
Burgher arms have a complicated and suppressed history in Portugal. During the reign of King Afonso V, burgher arms were restricted to the use of colours only. This restriction would become irrelevant when King Manuel I forbade the use of arms to those who were not of the Portuguese nobility. This restriction against burgher arms in Portugal lasted until the establishment of the Republic in 1910.

== Arms of peasants ==
In some regions (Normandy, Flanders) even peasants sometimes bore arms. In Switzerland 14th century arms of farmers are known, but they are rare and did not become numerous until the 17th century, as well as in Lower Saxony, Frisia and Tyrol, where farmers had personal freedom. In Denmark arms of farmers are preserved on seals from about 1300. In Norway peasants have used arms since the Middle Ages and some of the arms have even been used as family arms.

== See also ==
- Bourgeoisie
- Grand Burgher
- Bourgeois of Paris
- Bourgeois of Brussels
- Bourgeoisie of Geneva
