= Office of the Chief Herald of Arms of Malta =

Heraldic authority in Malta

The Office of the Chief Herald of Arms of Malta is the official heraldic authority of the Republic of Malta. Established in 2019, it grants and registers coats of arms and badges for citizens and institutions in Malta and other countries. The office, which is an agency of Heritage Malta, is headed by the Chief Herald of Arms of Malta, who is assisted by a deputy, a few pursuivants, and a registrar.

== Establishment of the office ==
The office was established by Heritage Malta, by means of an official notice announcing the appointment of the first Chief Herald with effect from 21 March 2019. However, the validity of the appointment was questioned on the grounds that the Cultural Heritage Act, under which Heritage Malta operates, did not refer to heraldry. An investigation by the Maltese ombudsman in 2021 concluded that the establishment of the office was "somewhat defective", the provisions of the Act did not appear to have been correctly followed, and the powers granted to the Office went beyond what was permitted by the Act. The situation was rectified by an amendment to the Act in 2021. Regulations placing the office on a firm statutory basis were gazetted in December 2021, and came into effect on 21 January 2022.

== Grants and registrations of arms ==
The regulations authorise the Chief Herald of Arms to

- devise and grant arms, by Letters Patent, to individuals and bodies corporate;
- register arms which have been granted to individuals or bodies corporate by heraldry authorities in other countries, and issue them with Certificates of Registration.

Personal arms granted by Letters Patent devolve to the grantee's descendants, with the application of cadency or differencing where appropriate. A grant of corporate arms evidently applies only for as long as the grantee organisation exists, and must be suspended if it is dissolved, abolished, wound up or becomes bankrupt.

A Certificate of Registration serves only as proof that the arms have been registered.

Information published by the office in April 2022 indicates that :

- a grant of personal arms may be made to citizens of Malta and to citizens of other countries, and is "a singular honour issued at the discretion of the Chief of Herald of Arms," based on the following criteria : (a) any honours received, (b) involvement of the applicant in public life, together with other merits and activities, (c) professional qualifications held by the applicant, and (d) membership of orders of chivalry;
- when considering an application for a grant of impersonal (corporate) arms, the Chief Herald of Arms will consider (a) the nature of the institution, to ensure that it is non-controversial and socially acceptable, (b) how long it has been in existence, and (c) the number of members it has.

== Chief Herald of Arms of Malta ==
The first incumbent of the office is Dr Charles A. Gauci, who was appointed with effect from 21 March 2019, and re-appointed, after the legislative difficulties had been dealt with, in January 2022. The appointment is for three years, but can be renewed for further three-year periods.

== See also ==
- Maltese heraldry
