= Council of Nobility =

Counsel to the King of the Belgians

The Council of Nobility (French: Conseil de noblesse, Dutch: Raad van Adel) offers counsel to the King of the Belgians regarding all matters pertaining to the Kingdom's nobility.

== History ==
It was created by Royal Decree on 27 February 1996 as a replacement of the Conseil héraldique de Belgique (Heraldry Council of Belgium) which itself was created on 6 February 1844.

== Heraldic authority ==
It also serves as the heraldic authority for the Belgian nobility. It does so alongside the two other heraldic authorities of Belgium: the Council of Heraldry and Vexillology for the French community and the Flemish Heraldic Council for the Flemish community.

== See also ==
- Belgian heraldry
