= Grant of arms =

Right to bear a particular coat of arms or armorial bearings

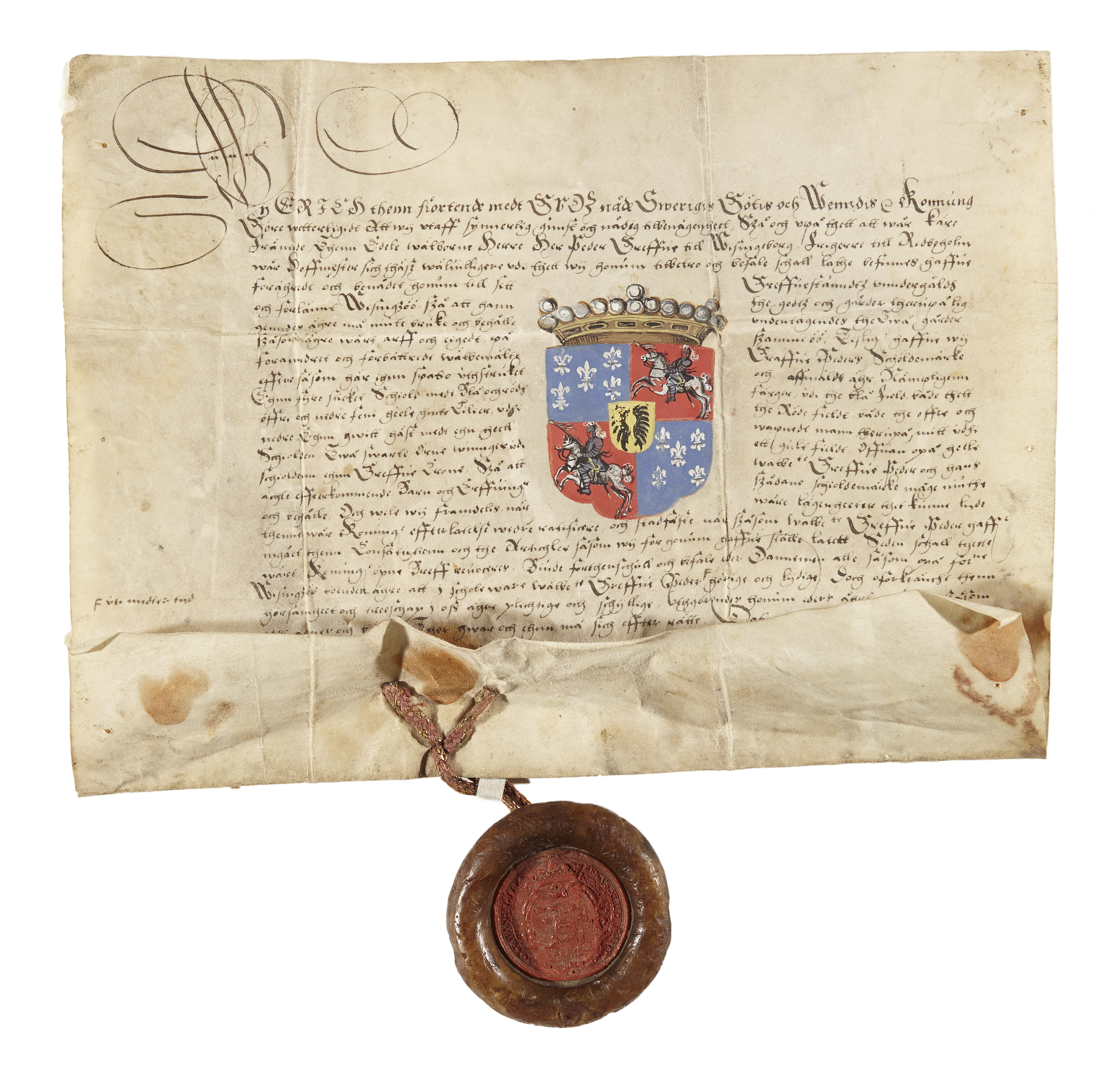
Swedish grant of arms from 1562.

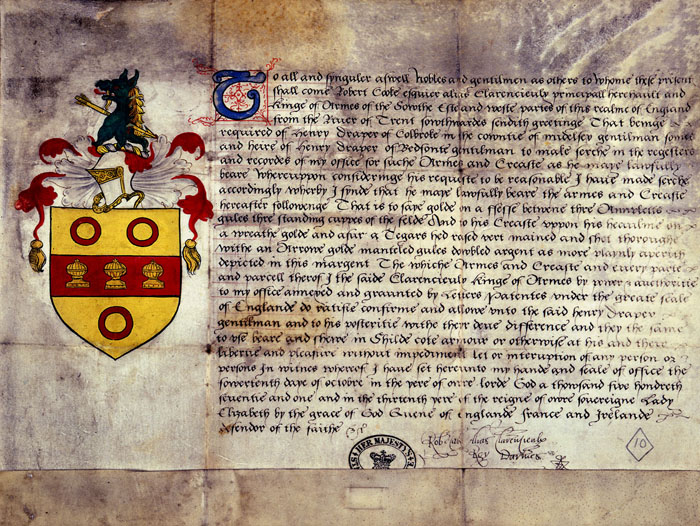
Grant by Clarenceux King of Arms Robert Cooke to Henry Draper of Colnbrook giving him the right to use the arms illustrated; dated 14 October 1571. Source: The National Archives UK

A grant of arms or a governmental issuance of arms is an instrument issued by a lawful authority, such as an officer of arms or State Herald, which confers on a person and their descendants the right to bear a particular coat of arms or armorial bearings. It is one of the ways in which a person may lawfully bear arms in a jurisdiction regulating heraldry, another being by birth, through inheritance.

Historically a grant of arms is distinguished from both a confirmation of arms and a private registration of arms. A grant of arms confers a new right, whereas a confirmation of arms confirms an existing right; and a private registration of arms is a record which does not purport to create or confirm any legal right. However a governmental registration of arms by an official government agency, (e.g., Bureau of Heraldry in South Africa) does create and confirm new legal rights.

A grant of arms or government registration of arms typically takes the form of letters patent, which provide self-contained proof, upon production of the letters patent, of the right conferred. For example, a grant or patent of arms from officers of the College of Arms in London, as well as related letters patent such as a grant of an augmentation, a crest, or supporters, will begin with the words "To all and singular to whom these presents shall come..." or variations thereof, thereby showing that the grant is addressed to anyone in the world to whom it may be presented; this applies equally to grants made to private individuals and to grants made to corporate bodies, and also applies to grants made to entities in Australia or any other Commonwealth realm in which the College has heraldic jurisdiction.

== Grants of arms and nobility ==
It is a common misconception that arms or grants of arms are always associated with nobility. This is only the case in the United Kingdom, where a grant of arms by the College of Arms or Lord Lyon confirms the state of gentility, which is equivalent to Continental untitled nobility, and is thus de facto a patent of nobility. Continental grants of arms do not ennoble unless it is explicitly stated in the letters patent.

== See also ==
- Law of Arms
- King of Arms
- Officer of Arms
