= Royal Belgian Genealogical and Heraldic Office =

The Royal Belgian Genealogical and Heraldic Office
- Native name: Association Royale Office Généalogique et Héraldique de Belgique
- Company type: ASBL
- Founded: 1942
- Headquarters: Woluwe-Saint-Pierre
- Key people: Bertrand Maus de Rolley (president); François-Xavier Geubel (VP); Philippe Petit (general secretary)
- Members: 1000+
- Website: oghb

The Royal Belgian Genealogical and Heraldic Office (French: Association Royale Office Généalogique et Héraldique de Belgique or OGHB) is a private genealogical and heraldic society in Belgium. It was founded in 1942 as an ASBL and has over a thousand members interested in genealogy and heraldry. While it publishes exclusively in the French language, it covers all regions of Belgium.

Its main purpose is the historical study of families without distinction of social class or profession as well as the auxiliary sciences of history, such as genealogy and heraldry.

The OGHB benefits from royal patronage and government subsidies and is thus considered as having a somewhat greater status than a purely private society.

It used to record the arms of persons and families before this task was taken over by the Council of Heraldry and Vexillology for the French Community and the Flemish Heraldic Council for the Flemish Community.

== Publications ==
The association publishes a number of publications:

- Le Parchemin: a bimonthly review with table and index.
- Le Héraut: quarterly link sheet with practical information and announcements.
- Les Recueils: works, each issue of which includes a major study (most often genealogical). Example: the living heraldic armorial.

== Board of directors ==
Mr François de PIERPONT	president
Mr Bertrand MAUS de ROLLEY	vice-president, general treasurer
Mr François-Xavier GEUBEL	vice-president
Mr Philippe PETIT	general secretary
Mr Marc BELVAUX	secretary of redaction of the Parchemin
Mr Damien BREULS de TIECKEN	responsible for logistics
Mr Christophe DEFOSSA	director of the Recueil
Mr Bernard de HAAN	administrator
Mr Renaud HACHEZ	administrator
Mr Baudouin D'HOORE	archivist
Mr Frédéric de MONTPELLIER d'ANNEVOIE	director of the Parchemin
Mr Jean-Jacques van ORMELINGEN	administrator
Mr Cédric PAUWELS	administrator
Count Baudouin d'URSEL	administrator
Mr Bernard VANDERMEERSCH	administrator

== See also ==
- Family history society
- Belgian heraldry
- Council of Heraldry and Vexillology
- Flemish Heraldic Council
- Heraldry societies
- Association Royale des Descendants des Lignages de Bruxelles
