= Flemish Heraldic Council =

Vlaamse Heraldische Raad
- Coat of arms of the Council
- Predecessor: Genealogical and Heraldic Office of Belgium
- Formation: 11 April 1984
- Purpose: Supervising the granting and recording of heraldry
- Region served: Flemish Community of Belgium
- Official language: Dutch
- Key people: Luc Duerloo (President)
- Website: / SARO Vlaanderen

The Flemish Heraldic Council (Dutch: Vlaamse Heraldische Raad, French: Conseil héraldique flamand) advises the Flemish Government on all matters relating to heraldry. The Council was created on 11 April 1984, as the successor to the Subcommittee for Heraldry or Subcommissie Heraldiek, established in 1978. Its prime task was to supervise the granting of a coat of arms and a flag to all municipalities of the Flemish Region. Following the reorganization of the Belgian provinces, the council's field of action was extended to provincial arms and flags in 1994. Since 2000, the Council has likewise advised the Flemish Government on grants of arms to Flemish individuals and corporations. In the meantime, more than 200 such grants have received official sanction. Grants of arms by the Flemish Government are published in the Belgian official journal.

The Council of Heraldry and Vexillology serves a similar purpose in the French Community.

== Heraldry of provinces and municipalities ==
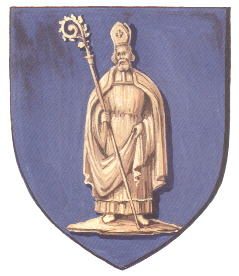
Arms of Baarle-Hertog, as recognized in 1910. Baarle-Hertog was not merged in 1977 and could therefore continue to bear these arms.

Before 1977 the heraldry of Belgian municipalities was regulated by two Royal Decrees. The Royal Decree of 6 February 1837 provided for the recognition of arms used by local governments during the Ancien Régime. The Royal Decree of 14 February 1913 allowed municipalities that could not prove their entitlement to ancient arms to petition for a grant of new arms. In either case recognitions and grants of arms to municipalities were made by Royal Decree. The procedure depended on the initiative of local councils and was administered by the Ministry of the Interior in close consultation with the Council of the Nobility. By 1976 39% of the Belgian municipalities were armigerous. There were, however, significant regional differences. Whereas 61% of the municipalities in the Flemish Region had the right to bear arms, only 25% of those in the Walloon Region enjoyed the same. The majority of armigerous municipalities was even more pronounced in the provinces of East Flanders (73%) and Antwerp (75%). Broadly speaking these figures reflected the relative degree of urbanization and the long and strong tradition of local self-government in the erstwhile feudal entities of Flanders and Brabant.

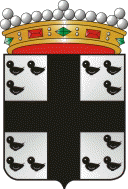
Arms of the town of Izegem, granted 1979.

Following a major overhaul of local government, the number of Belgian municipalities was reduced from 2359 to 596 on 1 January 1977. Six years later, one more merger brought the number down to 589. In the Flemish Region the number of municipalities fell from 906 to 308. Municipalities that were affected by a merger could no longer use their preexisting arms. As a result, a mere 66 (21%) of Flemish municipalities could continue to bear a coat of arms. On the eve of the mergers the Cultural Council of the Dutch Speaking Cultural Community (the precursor of the Flemish Parliament) used its powers to legislate in cultural affairs to vote a decree aimed at safeguarding the heraldic heritage of local authorities. The measure received the royal assent on 28 January 1977. Under the terms of the decree every municipality is obliged to have its own arms and flag. The arms have to be displayed on the municipal seal that is used to authenticate official documents. The local council has to initiate the procedure by proposing a coat of arms and a flag. Proposals have to conform to the principles of heraldry and vexillology. The arms furthermore have to take the local historic and heraldic heritage into account.

Flag of Borsbeek, granted 1993.

On 21 December 1978 a Royal Decree instituted the Subcommittee of Heraldry within the Royal Commission for Monuments and Sites with instructions to report on the municipalities' proposals. Following the revision of the Belgian constitution of 1980, the Subcommittee was upgraded to become the independent Flemish Heraldic Council by the decree of the Flemish Government of 11 April 1984. The task of the Council in matters of local heraldry has always been advisory. It considers the symbolism and design of the arms and flags, bearing in mind historical precedents. In many cases it makes suggestions for improvement. Upon recommendation by the Council, the municipal arms and flag are given official approval. Until 1980 the approval took the form of a Royal Decree. Since then it is issued as a Decree of the competent Flemish minister. Under the aegis of the Flemish Heraldic Council, Flemish municipal heraldry has gone through a complete overhaul. The task of assigning a proper coat of arms and flag to each municipality was completed by the early 1990s. In the process care was taken to rectify errors from the past, execute drawings in a clear style and standardize the blazon. While municipal coats of arms have to be in keeping with local historic and heraldic heritage, considerably more creativity is allowed in the design of flags.

Arms of the province of Limburg, granted 1996.

Flag of the province of Antwerp, granted 1997.

Before 1994, the arms of the Belgian provinces were never the subject of a separate legal disposition. They were merely described as banners surmounting the royal mantle in the greater arms of the kingdom. The decision to divide the original province of Brabant into Flemish Brabant, Walloon Brabant and the capital region of Brussels, motivated the Flemish Parliament to approve the decree of 21 December 1994, extending the existing legislation on municipal arms and flags to include the five Flemish provinces. The decree furthermore stated that provincial arms would be augmented with supporters and surmounted by a coronet or bonnet corresponding to the historic titles to which their names referred. Thus the provinces of Flemish Brabant and Limburg were given a ducal bonnet, those of West Flanders and East Flanders a count's coronet and the province of Antwerp the coronet of a sovereign margrave. Supporters and the accompanying compartments were based on historical, heraldic and geographical considerations. Thus the deer and the swan of Limburg were based on the arms of Hasselt and Tongeren, the two historical centers of the province, while the oak branches refer to the lore of woods of oak trees.

== Heraldry of families and corporations ==
A decree of 3 February 1998 providing for the means of granting arms to private individuals and institutions was put into effect in 2000.

Examples of grants to people and families

Coat of arms of the Caluwaerts family, granted on 2 September 2003.

Coat of arms of the Haelterman family, granted on 1 March 2019.

Coat of arms of the De Keyser family, granted on 18 April 2018.

Coat of arms of the De Laet family, granted on 30 November 2004.

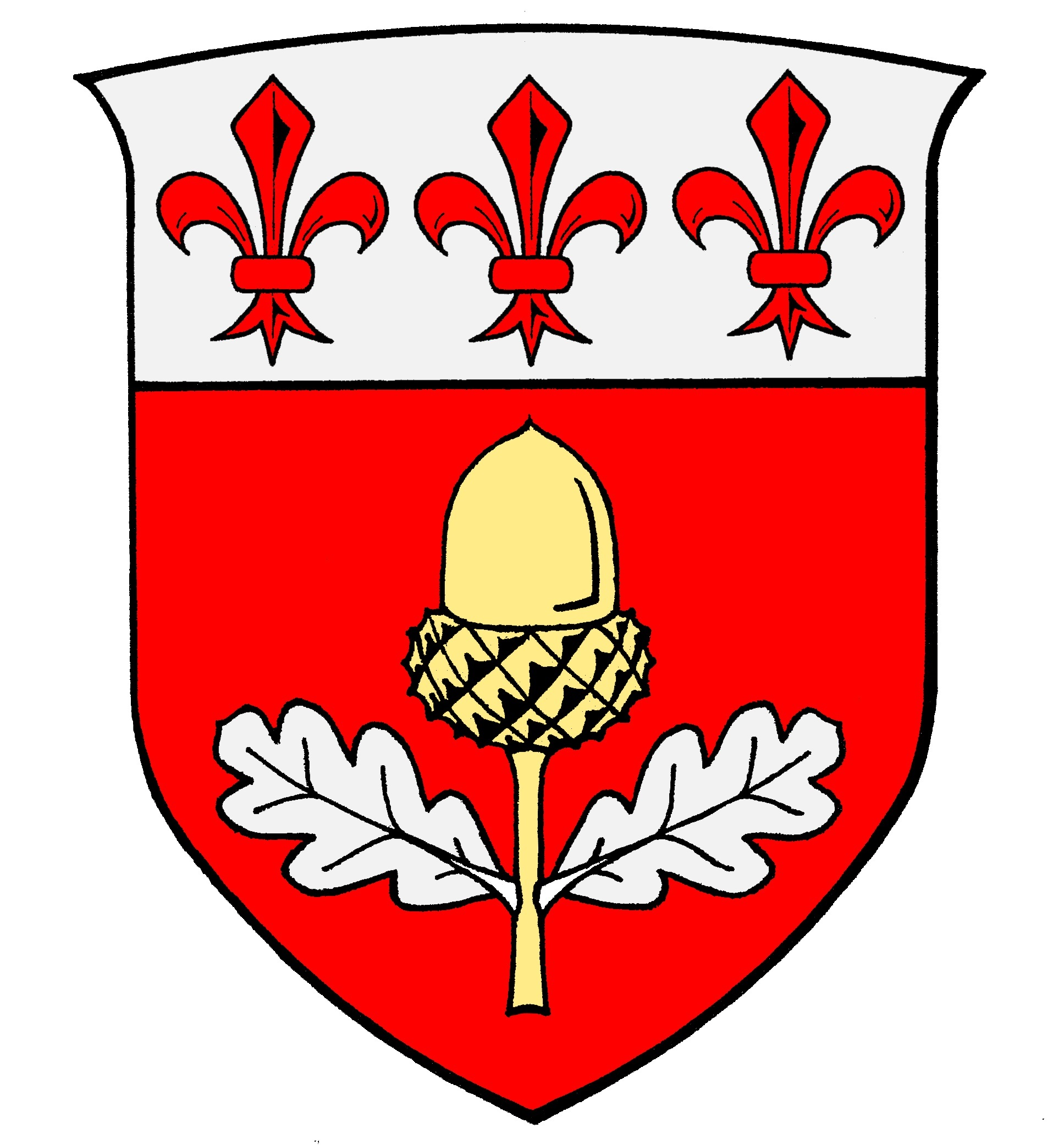
Coat of arms of the du Quesne family, granted on 2 September 2003.

== Presidents of the Flemish Heraldic Council ==
- Ernest Warlop (1984-1997)
- Lieve Viaene-Awouters (1997-2005)
- André Vandewalle (2005-2014)
- Luc Duerloo (2015- )

== Current members of the Flemish Heraldic Council ==
- Luc Duerloo, president
- Leonard Adriaen
- Jozef Dauwe
- Brigitte Meijns
- Annelies Somers
- Anne-Laure Van Bruaene
- Valeria Van Camp
- Steven Thiry, secretary

== Other Heraldic authorities in Belgium ==
The Council of Heraldry and Vexillology serves a similar purpose in the French Community and the Council of Nobility (est. 1844) grants arms to the nobility in all of Belgium.

== Sources ==
- Viaene-Awouters, Lieve (1977). "Samenvoeging van gemeenten en gemeentewapens". Driemaandelijks tijdschrift van het Gemeentekrediet van België. 31. Gemeentekrediet: 289–301. ISSN 0773-9273.
- Scufflaire, Andrée (1979). "De gemeentewapens na de samenvoeging van gemeenten". Driemaandelijks tijdschrift van het Gemeentekrediet van België. 33. Gemeentekrediet: 171–179. ISSN 0773-9273.
- Viaene-Awouters, Lieve; Warlop, Ernest (2002). Gemeentewapens in België: Vlaanderen en Brussel. Gemeentekrediet. ISBN 90-5066-201-3.

== See also ==
- Belgian heraldry
- Council of Heraldry and Vexillology of the French Community of Belgium
- Genealogical and Heraldic Office of Belgium
- Heraldry
- Burgher arms
