= Seal of the president of Nigeria =

Seal of the president of the Federal Republic of Nigeria
- Armiger: President of the Federal Republic of Nigeria
- Adopted: 1979 (Current incarnation adopted 1999)
- Crest: On a wreath, Argent and Vert, an eagle displayed gules
- Shield: Blazoned sable a pall wavy argent
- Supporters: Two horses Argent
- Motto: UNITY AND FAITH, PEACE AND PROGRESS
- Use: On documents from the president to Parliament, and as a symbol on presidential vehicles, lecterns, and other places

The seal of the president of the Federal Republic of Nigeria is the official symbol of the Nigerian president. It was first used in 1979 by President Shehu Shagari in the ill-fated second republic, and jettisoned by the successive military regimes from 1983 to 1999. The presidential seal returned to usage in the wake of the fourth republic in 1999, and it has remained in use since.

== See also ==
- Coat of arms of Nigeria
- Nigerian heraldry
- Seal of the vice-president of Nigeria
