= Carl-Alexander von Volborth =

German-born American heraldic artist and heraldist

Carl-Alexander von Volborth (February 21, 1919, Berlin-Charlottenburg – February 25, 2009, Antwerp) was a German-born fine artist and American heraldic artist and heraldist.

Born in Berlin-Charlottenburg, Volborth received the Gustaf von Numers Prize 1984 in the XVIth International Congress of Genealogical and Heraldic Sciences in Helsinki. He was a member of HEROLD, Verein für Heraldik, Genealogie und verwandte Wissenschaften zu Berlin e. V. from 1990 and a member of Académie Internationale d'Héraldique.

Volborth lived and worked in the United States (Cincinnati, Ohio) from 1953 to 1968. In Cincinnati, Ohio he taught at the Central Academy for Commercial Art, art history on WCET Educational Television, and the University of Cincinnati Evening College. He briefly shared an art studio with the well-known photographer Kazik Pazovski, where he taught art classes and conducted seminars and lecture series. He maintained numerous art groups for private instruction. His works can be found in many prominent Cincinnati homes, in churches, and Xavier University as well as the University of Cincinnati and corporate and private collections in Europe. He was equally adept in a variety of media and styles. Equally comfortable with portraiture, sill-life, and landscape, later in life he branched out to explore abstract art as well. He also published extensively on the subject of heraldry. These works, illustrated by him, were published internationally in several languages and received widespread acclaim. Volborth married twice; firstly, in 1942, to Rose Ottilie (née Duvernoy, from whom he was divorced in the 1968s,) and, second, to a Belgian diplomat, Diana Danys. He lived the final years of his life with his second wife in Antwerp, Belgium, from whence he established a reputation throughout Europe, with examples of his art in private and corporate collections. Throughout, he continued to publish in the subject of Heraldry as well. From his first marriage his eldest son was lost in an accident while an officer in the U.S. Navy in 1968, and two sons continue to live in Cincinnati.

Volborth was admitted to the Johanniterorden ("Order of Saint John") in 1977. Four years later, he received the accolade as a Knight of Justice (Rechtsritter) in the Order.

In 1962, Volborth illustrated and published a roll of arms of the knights of the Order living in North America.

== Works ==
- Roll of Arms of Knights of the Bailiwick of Brandenburg of the Chivalric Order of St. John of the Hospital of Jerusalem Called "Johanniter-Orden" who live in the United States and Canada, 1962
- Heraldry: Customs, Rules, and Styles Poole, Dorset, New Orchard Editions, 1981, 229 pp.
- The Art of Heraldry, Poole, Dorset, Blandford Press, 1984, 224 pp.
- Heraldry of the World (edited by Hubert Chesshyre) Poole, Dorset, Blandford Press 1973, 251 pp.
- Little Manual of Heraldry: A Synoptical Approach
- The Very Dubious Codex Senilski (with Marc Van de Cruys), Homunculus, Wijnegem 2004
- The Very Peculiar Codex of Pluckingham Court, Homunculus, Wijnegem 2006

== Bibliography ==
- von Volborth, Carl-Alexander (1987). The Art of Heraldry. Tiger Books International. ISBN 1-85501-154-9.
