= College of Arms (Kenya) =

Kenyan statutory body for heraldic arms

Heraldic authority overview
- Formed: 19 April 1968
- Jurisdiction: Kenya
- Headquarters: Sheria House, 2nd Floor, Nairobi, Kenya
- Heraldic authority executives: Cabinet Secretary, Chairperson; Registrar-General, Registrar
- Key documents: College of Arms Act, Cap. 98; College of Arms Rules, Legal Notice 157 of 1968
- Website: coatofarms.ecitizen.go.ke

The College of Arms is the statutory body in Kenya responsible for the grant and registration of coats of arms and other armorial bearings. It was established by the College of Arms Act, Cap. 98, which was assented to on 10 April 1968 and commenced on 19 April 1968. The Act's stated purpose is to establish the College, provide for the grant and registration of grants of arms, and prohibit the misuse of arms that have been granted. The College of Arms is part of the Office of the Attorney General and gives its public-facing mandate as the grant and registration of coats of arms, the registration of foreign coats of arms, and the registration of other armorial bearings.

== History and legal basis ==
The College was created under the College of Arms Act, Cap. 98, a Kenyan Act that entered into force on 19 April 1968. Kenya Law's version of the Act dated 31 December 2022 records amendments in 1975, 1993 and 2002, and a revision by the 24th Annual Supplement, Legal Notice 221 of 2023. The Act is supplemented by the College of Arms Rules, Legal Notice 157 of 1968, which commenced on 31 May 1968 and was later amended in 1997 and 2003.

== Organisation ==
Under section 3 of the College of Arms Act, the College consists of the Cabinet Secretary, or a person deputed by the Cabinet Secretary, as chairperson, together with four persons appointed by the Cabinet Secretary. The Act sets the College's quorum at three members and allows the College to regulate its own procedure. The Act provides for a registrar of the College, being the Registrar-General or a person deputed by the Registrar-General.

== Terminology and scope ==
For purposes of the College of Arms Act, "arms" means any coat of arms, crest, seal or other armorial bearing, other than a "specified emblem" within the meaning of the National Flag, Emblems and Names Act, Cap. 99. The State Law Office describes a coat of arms as an official shield or seal bearing an arrangement of symbols, and describes a blazon as the formal heraldic description of a coat of arms. Applicants who wish to use national symbols protected under the National Flag, Emblems and Names Act in their designs need written authorization.

== Functions and powers ==
The College may consider applications from any person who desires a grant of arms and may make a grant if it considers the case a proper one for a grant. The State Law Office states that applicants may include individuals, national and county governments, government departments and agencies, defence force units, corporations, hospitals, churches, professional associations, educational institutions, clubs, companies and boards. The College of Arms' mandate includes registering and granting coats of arms, registering foreign coats of arms, and registering other armorial bearings, including flags, crests, seals, emblems, badges, uniforms, ceremonial gowns and maces.

In considering an application for a grant of arms, the College must consider the propriety of the design, whether the design resembles arms already registered under the Act, whether it resembles arms granted in another country, whether it resembles a specified emblem, whether it accords with the principles of heraldry, and whether it has sufficient artistic merit. The Act permits the College to consult any person or institution and to employ persons to provide services while considering an application. After making a grant, the College must deliver the grant to the Registrar, who registers it and delivers it to the applicant. The Act also permits a person who has received a grant of arms from a proper authority in another country to apply for registration of that grant in Kenya if the Registrar is satisfied that the arms are not likely to mislead by reason of resemblance to other arms registered under the Act.

== Applications and registration ==
The College of Arms Rules require applications for a grant of arms to be made to the registrar. The Rules require applications for registration of a foreign grant of arms to be made and to be accompanied by the original grant or by a copy certified by the authority that made the grant. The Rules prescribe a fee of KSh 10,000 for an application for a grant of arms and KSh 5,000 for registration of a grant.

The State Law Office's procedure for local coats of arms requires an applicant to submit six coloured copies of the proposed coat of arms with its blazon, complete necessary forms, and pay KSh 10,000 before the application is placed before the College for deliberation. If a local application is approved, the State Law Office procedure directs the applicant to pay KSh 26,000 for vellum parchment, collect the parchment for engrossment, return the engrossed grant to the registry, and submit a 13 cm by 17 cm photograph of the framed executed grant for the registry record. For a foreign coat of arms, the State Law Office procedure requires six colored copies of a certified copy of the foreign grant from a proper authority, completion of necessary forms and payment of KSh 5,000 before the application is placed before the College. The State Law Office procedure states that approved local and foreign grants are published by the Registrar in the Kenya Gazette. The College of Arms Rules allow the register of arms to be inspected at the registrar's office between 9:00 a.m. and 12:30 p.m. and between 2:15 p.m. and 3:30 p.m. on payment of a KSh 5 fee.

== Legal protection and evidentiary effect ==
Where arms have been registered under the Act, no person other than the grantee or the grantee's heirs may display or otherwise use those arms without the grantee's written license. A person who contravenes that prohibition commits an offense and is liable to a fine not exceeding KSh 5,000. The Act provides that parts of the register purporting to be copies of grants of arms are presumed, until the contrary is proved, to be true copies in legal proceedings. The Act also provides that certified extracts or copies from the register are admissible as prima facie evidence of the register's contents, and that certificates by the Registrar concerning whether arms are registered are admissible as evidence of those matters.

== County symbols ==
County governments interact with the College through section 4 of the County Governments Act, Cap. 265, which requires every county to enact legislation prescribing the county flag, county coat of arms and county public seal. The County Governments Act requires the relevant county executive committee member to develop proposed county symbols through a consultative process, submit them to the county assembly for approval and apply to the College of Arms for a grant of arms under section 4 of the College of Arms Act. The County Governments Act also provides that county legislation on symbols must regulate their use in the same manner as the National Flag, Emblems and Names Act and that a county symbol must not be the same as, or bear a likeness or similarity to, a national symbol.

== Heraldic context ==
Design scholar Donna Pido has described Kenyan heraldic representation as the result of interaction between imported European heraldic systems and local aesthetic traditions. Pido argues that European colonial heraldic systems were carried into the post-independence period through coats of arms, seals, badges and flags used by Kenya's nation, counties, universities, schools, companies and societies. Pido identifies four streams in Kenyan heraldry: indigenous, British, innovative and digital. Pido also states that the creation of heraldic representations for Kenya's 47 counties revealed problems of design, artwork and cultural detail.

== Reform proposals ==
In the Office of the Attorney General and Department of Justice's Strategic Plan 2023/24–2027/28, the Office reported that a Heraldry Bill had been reviewed to provide structures for terms of reference for the College of Arms, to provide for grants of arms and to require mandatory registration of arms by public institutions.

== See also ==
- Coat of arms of Kenya
- Heraldry
- Registrar General
- Nigerian heraldry
- South African heraldry
