= South African heraldry =

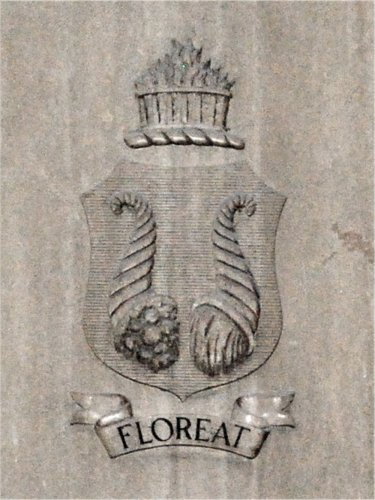
Bloemfontein (1882)

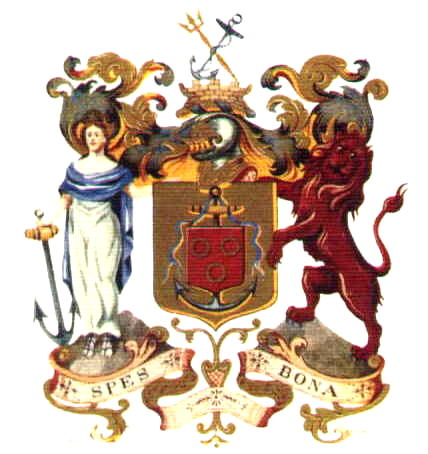
Cape Town (1899)

South Africa (1910)

South African heraldry dates back to the 1650s, inheriting European (especially Dutch and British) heraldic traditions. Arms are borne by individuals, official bodies, local authorities, military units, and by a wide variety of organisations. South Africa has had its own heraldic authority since 1963, to provide armigers with legal protection, and to promote high standards of armorial practice.

== Origins and history ==
The first known armorial display in South Africa took the form of stone beacons bearing the Portuguese Royal Arms, which were erected along the coast by navigators who explored the sea route in the 1480s. Some of these beacons still survive.

=== 17th–18th centuries ===
Heraldry was introduced into the region by the Dutch, when they founded the first European colony, at the Cape of Good Hope, in 1652. Under Roman-Dutch law, everyone had the right to assume and bear arms, and many settlers bore personal arms, some of which are still borne by their descendants today.

The official arms of the Netherlands, and those of the Verenigde Oost Indische Compagnie, which ran the colony, were also used. There do not appear to have been any other corporate arms during the Dutch colonial period, but there is evidence of some use of military unit arms in the 1780s. Civic arms were introduced in 1804.

=== 19th century ===
British military forces occupied the colony during the Napoleonic Wars, and the Netherlands handed it over permanently to Great Britain in 1814. This brought the colony within the jurisdiction of the English College of Arms, the Scottish Lord Lyon and the Irish Ulster Office. British law regards arms as an honour which must be granted or recognised by one or other of these authorities, but as Roman-Dutch law was retained in the colony, it remained legal to simply assume arms at will. Those who wanted formal grants of arms could apply to one of the three British authorities.

As with language, music, and other cultural aspects, then, British and Cape Dutch (Afrikaner) heraldry existed separately side by side. This is still the case, though there has been some cross-pollination during the past half-century.

Amongst the native peoples of the region, hereditary signifiers were generally oral as opposed to pictorial in nature. Praise poetry traditions such as Isiduko and Isibongo provided peoples such as the Zulus and the Xhosas with symbolic capital in much the same way as heraldry did the British and the Cape Dutch.

European settlement spread to other parts of the region in the 1830s, as a result of Afrikaner dissatisfaction with British rule. Eventually, the region crystallised into four White-ruled territories: two British colonies and two Afrikaner republics. Their governments adopted official arms.

=== 20th–21st centuries ===
The UK conquered the two Afrikaner republics in the Anglo-Boer War (1899–1902), and the four territories united in 1910 to form the Union of South Africa.

As self-government developed during the first half of the 20th century, some official attention began to be paid to heraldry.

In 1935, the Union government introduced a system of voluntary registration of "badges" by the Department of the Interior. It applied only to associations and institutions, such as schools and clubs, and several dozen of the more than 1300 items registered over the years were coats of arms. The Department of Education, Arts & Sciences took over as registrar in 1959.

The rise of Afrikaner nationalism during the 1930s and 1940s drew heavily on culture and tradition, and several books and articles on Afrikaner family history and heraldry were published during that period. As later research showed, the heraldic sources were generally not very reliable.

After an Afrikaner nationalist government took office in 1948, with a republic high on its agenda, steps were taken to bring order to the armorial chaos. Between 1949 and 1953, the four provincial administrations introduced systems of registering civic arms to protect them against usurpation. The defence force established its own heraldry office in 1954. In 1955, an inter-departmental conference recommended the formation of an official heraldic authority, and a committee appointed in 1956 recommended adopting the Swedish model, of a nominated council and an executive bureau, under the auspices of the state archives service.

The 1950s also saw an unprecedented number of English and Scottish grants of arms, to municipalities, corporate bodies, the Anglican dioceses, and a few individuals. With a republic in the offing, there may have been a feeling that it was "now or never".

South Africa became a republic and left the Commonwealth in 1961. A Heraldry Act was passed in 1962, and the Bureau of Heraldry and Heraldry Council were established in 1963. The Bureau took over from the Department of Education, Arts & Sciences and the provincial administrations as registering authority, and in addition to registering corporate and civic arms, it registers official and personal arms too. Arms have to be heraldically correct to qualify for registration, which remains voluntary. Matriculation, i.e. re-registration of personal arms for armigers' descendants, was authorised in 1969. Thousands of arms have been registered and matriculated over the years.

From 1963 to 1969, the Heraldry Act also provided for arms to be granted by the state president to official bodies and by the provincial administrators to local authorities. Grants were subject to Heraldry Council approval and were registered by the Bureau. (The Act has never authorised the Bureau to grant arms, only to register them.)

Since 1963, the Bureau has introduced many innovations, including lines of partition, charges drawn from South African fauna and flora and the African heritage and, in the early 1970s, a highly stylised, Finnish-influenced, artistic style.

== Usage of arms ==
Roman-Dutch law allows everyone to assume and bear arms, as long as no one else's rights are infringed in the process. Social status, or service to the country, are not requirements as they are in some other countries. There is therefore a wide range of armigers, including:

- individual persons
- national and provincial governments
- local authorities, e.g. municipalities, city councils, divisional councils, district councils
- government departments and agencies (though current government "branding" policy requires them to use the national arms instead)
- defence force units (army, air force, navy, military health service)
- corporations
- hospitals
- churches (especially Anglican and Roman Catholic)
- professional institutes and associations
- schools, colleges, technikons, and universities
- social and sports clubs.

=== Personal arms ===
As far as personal arms are concerned, there is full gender equality in both the form of arms and the principles of inheritance and transmission.

A woman can bear a full achievement of arms, i.e. shield and crest, and is not restricted to a lozenge without crest as is the case in England (although a woman can follow the English practice if she wishes). Mrs. Selma Peimer was the first woman to register a full achievement of arms at the Bureau of Heraldry (in 1965).

A woman is entitled to inherit paternal arms, even if she has brothers. This is in contrast with English rules, where a woman inherits paternal arms only if her father has died without leaving any sons or descendants of sons to inherit the arms. There are several instances on record where an armiger's registered arms have been re-registered by both sons and daughters. The earliest instance was the Van Hoorn family in 1979 : Aalje van Hoorn's arms were re-registered by his three sons and his daughter.

The Pritchard family provides an instance of the arms of both husband and wife being re-registered by their children (son and two daughters) as quartered arms.

In 1996, during his presidency of the country, Nelson Mandela was invested as a member of the Danish Order of the Elephant by the Queen of Denmark. As he wasn't an armiger at the time of his investiture, he had a coat of arms developed by the Danish court herald which bore the colours of the South African flag. Although these arms were intended by Mandela to be subsequently used wherever a coat of arms was required internationally, he never had them registered in South Africa.

== Regulation ==
There is little regulation of heraldry in South Africa. Arms which have been registered at the Bureau are protected to the extent that a registered owner can take legal action against anyone who usurps or misuses his arms. In the case of the arms of the national and provincial governments, defence force units, and municipalities, offenders can also be prosecuted and fined, and ridiculing or showing contempt for the national arms is punishable by imprisonment.

Registration of arms is entirely voluntary.

== Distinctive features ==
South African heraldry has a number of distinctive features:

- the use of indigenous animals, birds, fish, trees, and flowers as charges
- the use of African traditional weapons, huts, and headdress as charges
- the use of elements previously described in African praise poetry as charges and/or supporters
- the increasing use of Nguni shields, especially in civic arms
- the occasional use of tinctures such as brunatre (brown), ochre, and tenné (orange), which are uncommon in European heraldry; the national coat of arms, adopted in 2000, includes red ochre, while (yellow) ochre appears in the arms of the University of Transkei.
- the occasional use of an oxhide pattern for the field of a shield
- a uniform pattern for the arms of family associations
- uniform patterns for the arms of various types of military units
- the use of trefoils and trefly lines in the arms of educational institutions to represent the three participants in the education process, i.e. students, parents, and teachers
- the Bureau of Heraldry's distinctive style of artwork, introduced in the early 1970s and modified in the 1990s
- the adaptation of traditional lines of partition to create special effects
- the development of new lines of partition, e.g. the "gably" line based on Cape Dutch farmhouse gables, and a line suggesting an outline of Table Mountain
- the development of an Afrikaans heraldic vocabulary.

== See also ==
- Nigerian heraldry
- Bureau of Heraldry (South Africa)
- College of Arms (Kenya)
