= Dutch heraldry =

Use of coats of arms and insignia in the Netherlands

Lesser arms of the Netherlands

The study of Dutch heraldry focuses on the use of coats of arms and other insignia in the country of the Netherlands. Dutch heraldry is characterised by its simple and rather sober style, and in this sense, is closer to its medieval origins than the elaborate styles which developed in other heraldic traditions.

== History ==
One of the famous armorials is the Gelre Armorial, written between 1370 and 1414. Coats of arms in the Netherlands were not controlled by an official heraldic system like the two in the United Kingdom, nor were they used solely by noble families. Any person could develop and use a coat of arms if they wished to do so, provided they did not usurp someone else's arms, and historically, this right was enshrined in Roman Dutch law. As a result, many merchant families had coats of arms even though they were not members of the nobility. These are sometimes referred to as burgher arms, and it is thought that most arms of this type were adopted while the Netherlands was a republic (1581-1806). This heraldic tradition was also exported to the erstwhile Dutch colonies, such as South Africa, where it influenced South African heraldry.

== Terminology ==
Like English and some other countries' heraldry, achievements of arms are usually blazoned in a specialized jargon.

Tinctures									
English	Or	Argent	Azure	Gules	Vert	Purpure	Sable	Ermine	Vair
Heraldic name (Dutch)	Goud/Or	Zilver/Argent	Azuur/Lazuur (Blauw)	Keel (Rood)	Sinopel (Groen)	Purper	Sabel (Zwart)	Hermelijn	Vair

Ordinaries								
English	Pale	Fess	Bend	Bend sinister	Cross	Saltire	Chevron	Bordure
Dutch	Paal	Dwarsbalk	Schuinbalk	Linker schuinbalk or baar	Kruis	Schuinkruis or andrieskruis	Keper	Schildzoom

Division of the field						
English	Party per fess	Party per pale	Party per bend	Party per bend sinister	Quarterly	Party per saltire
Dutch	Doorsneden	Gedeeld	Geschuind	Linksgeschuind	Gevierendeeld (in vier kwartieren)	Schuin gevierendeeld

== Royal heraldry ==
Royal heraldry refers to the coats of arms of the members of the Dutch royal family, including the monarch and various princes.

Following the union of former territories of the former Dutch Republic, Austrian Netherlands, and Prince-Bishopric of Liège into a Kingdom in 1815, the following heraldic system was adopted by decree n. 71 of 24 Augustus 1815:

Dutch royal family members (1815–1907 heraldic system)
Monarch	Prince of Orange (heir apparent)	Eldest son of the Prince of Orange	Second son of the monarch	Eldest daughter of the monarch

The system of heraldry for the Dutch royal family was revised by a decree issued in 1907. The arms of the monarch and kingdom were updated and this update was therefore incorporated into the arms of the Prince of Orange and his son (specific references to arms of the second son and eldest daughter were removed, instead providing that the arms would be provided for separately). The theoretical revised arms of the Prince of Orange and his son would never be used as there would not be another Prince of Orange since 1884 until the birth of Willem-Alexander in 1967 and his becoming heir apparent in 1980. At the same time a new decree regarding the arms of the monarch and kingdom was issued repealing that of 1907.

No Dutch princes would be born until 1967. A new system of heraldry for the Dutch royal house emerged. In 1909, arms for the male-line descendants of Queen Wilhelmina and Duke Henry of Mecklenburg-Schwerin were granted. Likewise, arms were granted for subsequent marriages in the royal family.

For the children of Willem-Alexander, arms were granted in 2003 without specifying any difference for sons and daughters. Previously, arms for princes, would feature helms atop their heraldic achievement whereas females would use the royal crown. Now, both sons and daughters would use the royal crown.

Male-line descendants of Queen Wilhelmina

Male-line descendants of Queen Juliana

Male-line descendants of Queen Beatrix

Children of King Willem-Alexander

== Nobility ==
Heraldry of the Dutch nobility is managed by the Council of Nobility which maintains a register of arms.

Dutch coronet rankings
Prince (noble)	Duke	Marquess	Count	Viscount	Baron	Knight

== Civic heraldry ==
A depiction of the coat of arms of Amsterdam.

Dutch civic heraldry is regulated by the High Council of Nobility (Dutch: Hoge Raad van Adel), which grants the arms of provinces, municipalities, water boards, Roman Catholic dioceses and Roman Catholic basilicas. In 1817, it also granted arms to the Dutch Jewish Religious Community.

The High Council of Nobility also regulated arms of seignories until 1919, having lost their status under public law and having become subject to private law in 1848, although there were occasional instances of the granting or confirmation of seigneurial coats of arms thereafter. A lawsuit filed in 2025 by the owner of seigneurial rights to compel the High Council of Nobility to confirm the coat of arms of her seigneurial estate, however, confirmed that the council is not obligated to do so.

Most Dutch civic arms were originally recorded and confirmed in the years following the establishment of the Kingdom of the Netherlands in 1815, when mayors were asked to send in the coat of arms traditionally used. Some coats of arms recorded at that time were based on seals. In instances where the original tincture of the arms was unknown or unclear, the arms were blazoned in the ‘national tinctures’ or and azure, the colours of the royal arms. In the twentieth century, the faulty blazon of a number of these arms was subsequently corrected, when historical colours became clear or charges turned out to be misinterpreted.

Generally, the High Council pursues a policy of stylistic simplicity, as decreed by Interior Ministry guidelines from 1977. Most modern grants occur as a result of administrative reforms, with municipalities merging into larger ones. Usually, a civic body submits a proposal to the High Council which adapts it to meet heraldic standards. Regional historical or genealogical societies are known to have been involved drawing up these initial designs. Newly formed municipalities tend to press for inclusion of elements of the old arms of the constituting municipalities into the new arms, with the High Council sometimes rejecting proposals on the grounds that they are ‘overcharged’.

Helmets, crests and mantling are generally absent in Dutch civic heraldry; instead a system of rank coronets is used. Exceptions are the national arms and the coat of arms of Beverwijk. Supporters, mottoes and atypical coronets are only granted if there is historical evidence for them being used, or if a preceding grant featured them. A notable exception to this rule are arms granted to newly created municipalities of Flevoland in the late 1970s and early 1980s which feature seals, sealions and seahorses as supporters, the use of which was previously unknown in civic heraldry in the Netherlands. A few municipalities have renounced their right to supporters in recent years. Mottoes being generally rare, recent years have seen some pre-1795 mottoes being granted again.

The High Council generally disapproves of quartering of existing arms and has a policy not to include the figure of saints on shields. As the names of a number of recent fusion municipalities refer to water bodies or courses within their boundaries, an ordinary representing ‘water’ is an ever often occurrence in recent grants, with the High Council calling them "typical of Dutch heraldry" in 2004 and 2010.

== See also ==
- Frisian eagle
