= Coat of arms of Åland =

- The arms as used by the Lagting

Versions
- 1952 variant by Gustaf von Numers

- 1962 variant by Ahti Hammar
- Armiger: Åland
- Adopted: First recorded in 1560. Current version official since December 10th 1952.
- Shield: Azure a stag trippant Or.
- Other elements: Comital coronet above the shield

The coat of arms of Åland features a golden red deer on a blue field. This is traditionally surmounted by a comital coronet of the elder Swedish style.

== History ==
First known symbol of the Åland islands is a seal from 1326 depicting Saint Olaf, the patron saint of the islands. The saint is seated on a throne, holding in his hands a globus cruciger and an axe. The medieval seal was later used as an inspiration for the arms of Jomala municipality, granted in 1952.

The arms borne today by the Åland islands were originally granted to the similar-sounding island province of Öland in 1560, displaying a golden red deer on a blue field. In 1569, Åland had been given to the Swedish queen dowager Katarina Stenbock as a fief and was awarded a provincial coat of arms displaying two roe deer on a field strewn with nine roses. The arms of these two similar-sounding Swedish provinces became confused early on, and in the 1880s Öland's arms were recorded as two roe deer with nine roses. Sweden had ceded much of its eastern territory, including the Åland Islands, to Russia in 1809, which became the Grand Duchy of Finland, but the heraldic switch-up was not discovered until the 1940s.

During a heraldic revision in 1944, the Swedish National Heraldry Office (Riksheraldikerämbetet) discovered that a mistake had been committed. Heraldic authorities in Finland were notified of the error but ultimately decided not make any changes and not to adopt the coat of arms originally intended for Åland (with the two roe deer and nine Finnish roses), as they had long since granted Åland the arms which had been usurped from Öland. This decision made it necessary for Swedish heralds to once again alter the coat of arms for Öland, to avoid further confusion. It was then decided in 1944 that the Öland deer should have a red collar and attire to distinguish it from the arms which had been first granted to Öland but now belonged to Åland.

== Gallery ==
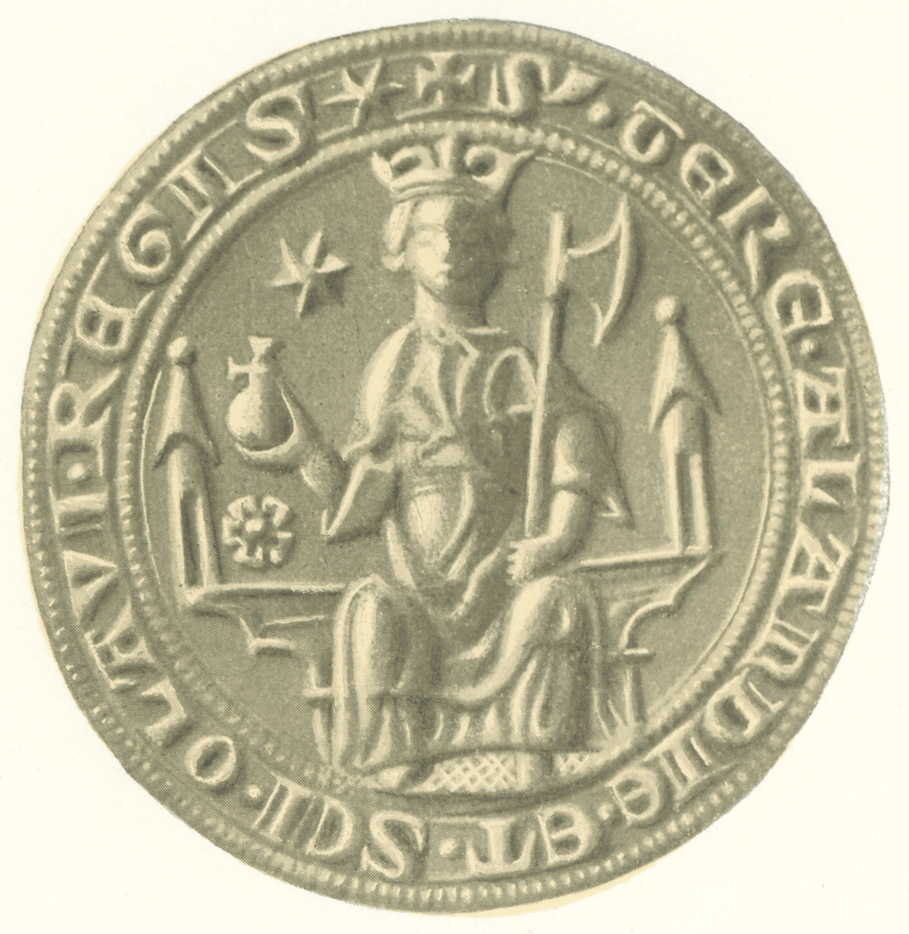
Seal of Åland from 1326

Arms granted to Öland in 1560 and used there prior to the 1569 transfer of Åland, subsequently used there until present day

Arms designed for Åland in the 16th century but instead used by Öland (officially 1880s–1944, but also used earlier)

Arms granted to Öland in 1944, with the red collar added and the attire changed to red to distinguish it from Åland

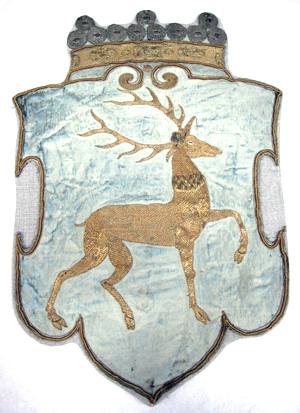
Arms of Åland used in the funeral of King Gustavus Adolphus in 1634.

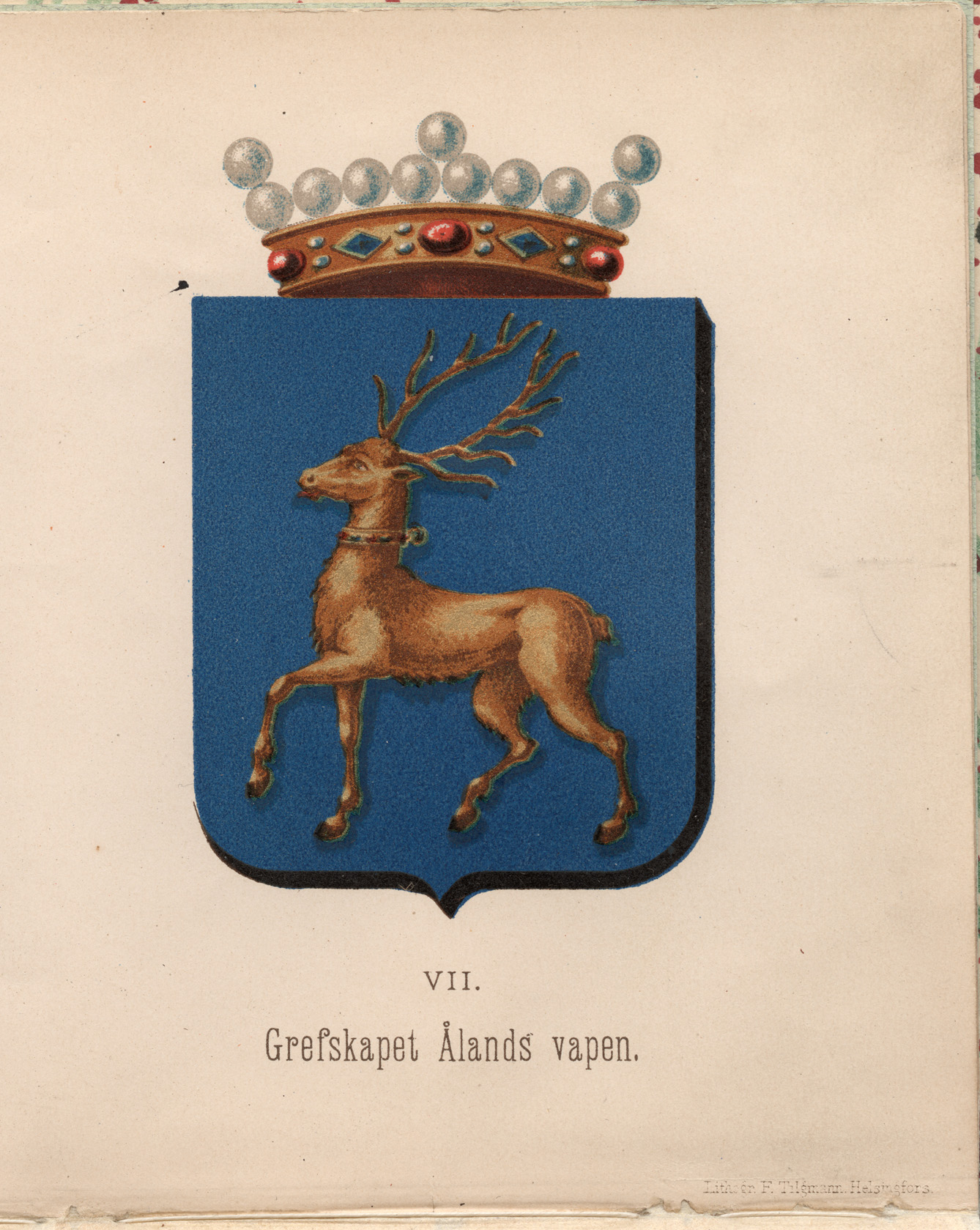
Arms of Åland by Karl Bomansson from 1889 showing the stag with a jewelled collar.

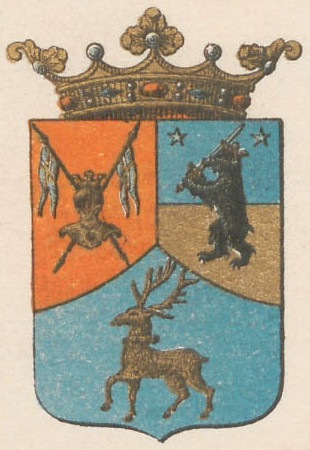
Arms of Åland as part of the arms of Turku and Pori Province from 1890.

== See also ==
- Flag of Åland
- Finnish heraldry
- Swedish heraldry
- Coat of arms of Öland
