= Harald Fleetwood =

Harald Fleetwood can refer to:

- Harald Fleetwood (1815–1907), Swedish marine insurer
- Harald Fleetwood (1879–1960), Swedish heraldist
