= Military Archives of Sweden =

Coordinates: 59.3418°N 18.0985°E

- Krigsarkivet

Agency overview
- Formed: 1805; 221 years ago
- Headquarters: Arninge, Täby, Stockholm County
- Parent department: Ministry of Culture
- Parent agency: National Archives of Sweden

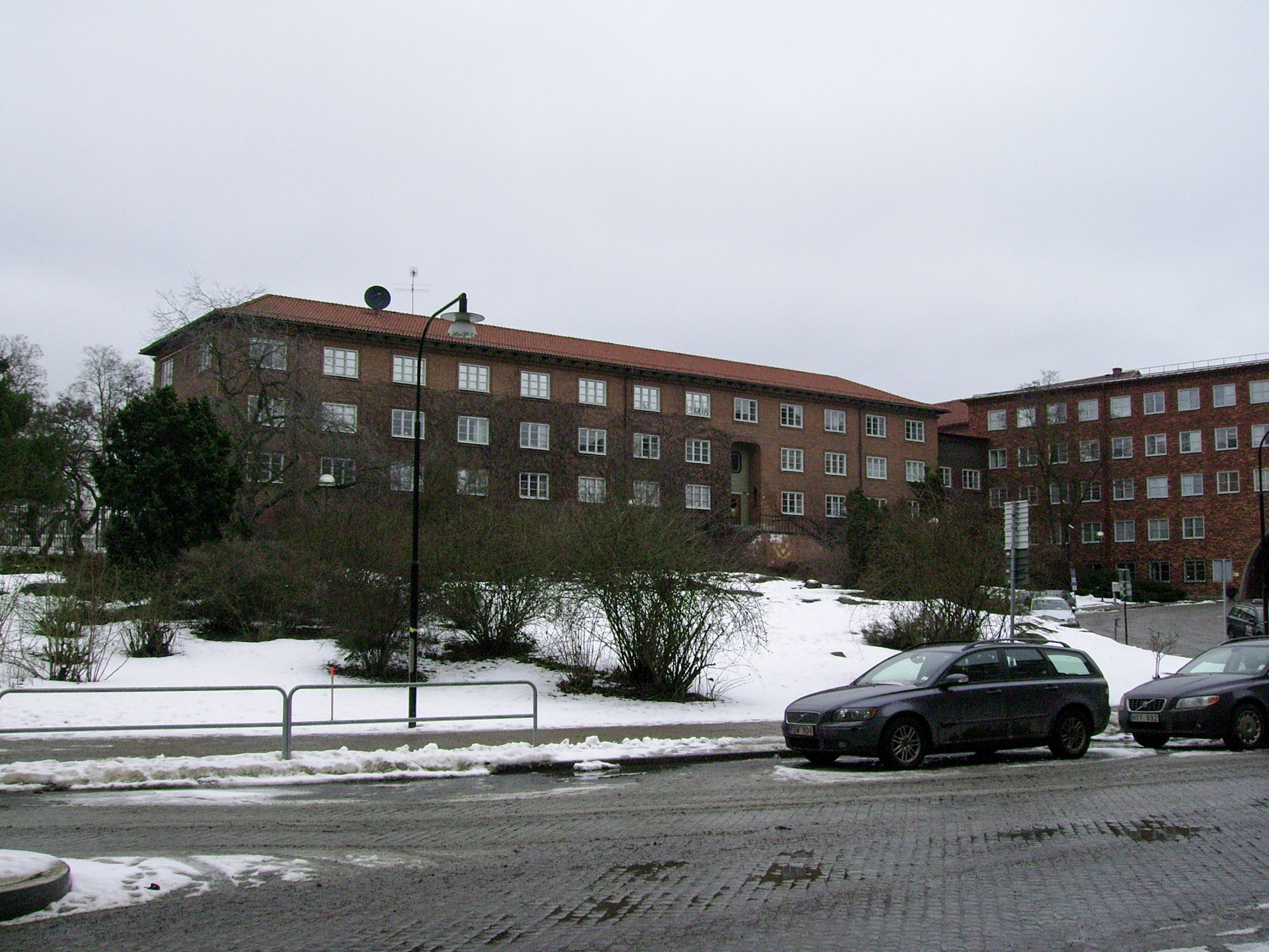
The Military Archives building in winter

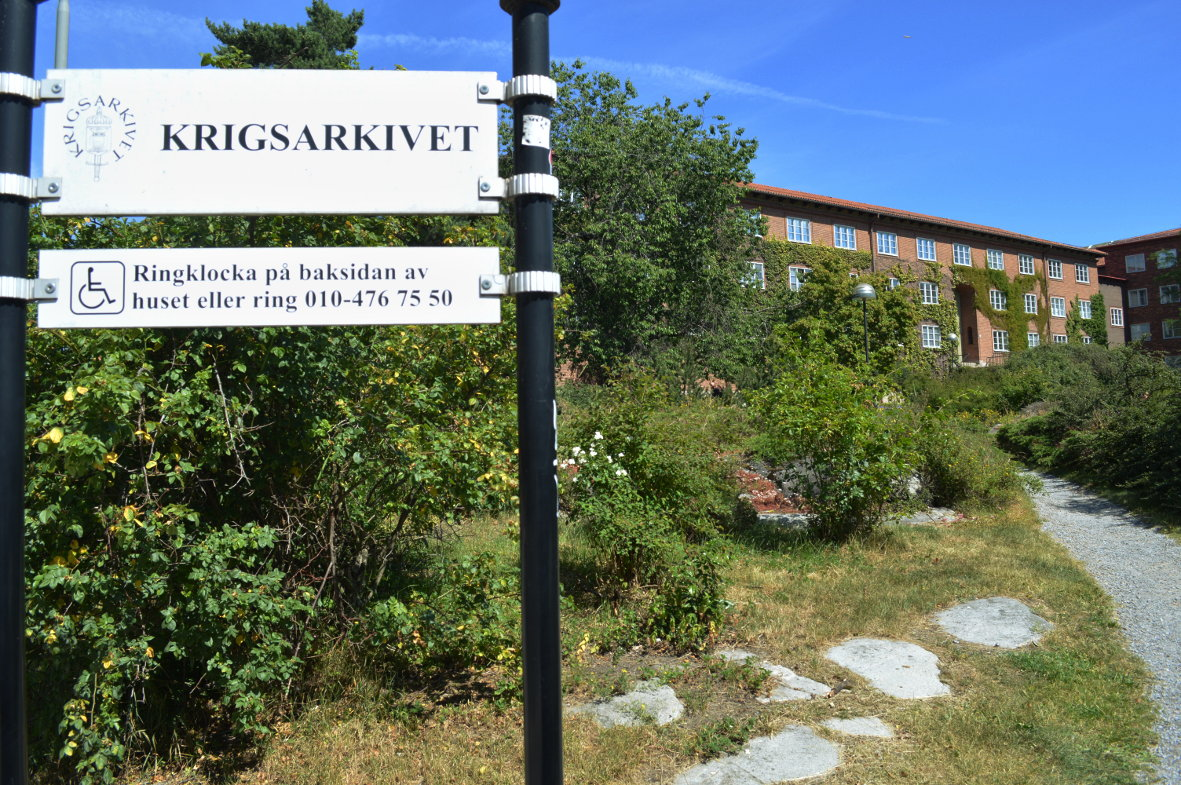
Krigsarkivet (The Military Archives) during the summer. Östermalm borough, Stockholm.

The Military Archives of Sweden (Swedish: Krigsarkivet) is the part of the National Archives of Sweden that keeps archives related to agencies that answer to the Ministry of Defence. The Military Archives were established in 1805 and contain listings of military personnel, drawings and descriptions of military buildings and equipment, maps, private files of key persons in Swedish military history, and photographs. The archived materials date from the 16th century to the present.

Since 1995, the Military Archives form a part of the government agency National Archives of Sweden.
