= Armorial of Åland =

Municipal coats of arms, Åland, Finland

This page is a list of coats of arms of Åland, the autonomous region of Finland.

== Coat of arms of Åland ==
The coat of arms used by the Lagting.

The coat of arms of Åland drawn by Gustaf von Numers in 1952.

The coat of arms of Åland drawn by Ahti Hammar in 1962.

== Municipalities ==
In Åland, it is mandatory for municipalities to have a coat of arms, thus all 16 municipalities of Åland have coats of arms.

This section is a list of coat of arms of municipalities in Åland. The year in brackets refer to the year in which the coat of arms was confirmed by the Government of Åland.

All municipal coats of arms of Åland were designed by Matts Dreijer. Arms of Kumlinge was redrawn by Gustaf von Numers in 1953. Arms of Mariehamn is redrawn by Nils Byman. The coat of arms of Föglö was jointly designed with A.W. Rancken.

Brändö (1952–)

Eckerö (1952–)

Finström (1969–)

Föglö (1951–)

Geta (1951–)

Hammarland (1951–)

Jomala (1947–)

Kumlinge (1951–)

Kökar (1952–)

Lemland (1951–)

Lumparland (1952–)

Mariehamn (1951–)

Saltvik (1952–)

Sottunga (1952–)

Sund (1947–)

Vårdö (1952–)

== See also ==
- Flag of Åland
- Finnish heraldry
