= Harald Fleetwood (1815–1907) =

Swedish baron and marine insurer (1815–1907)

Baron Harald Fleetwood
- Born: Lars Harald Adolf Fleetwood; 8 May 1815; Estate of Salaholm, Trävattna Parish, Västergötland, Sweden
- Died: 11 August 1907 (aged 92); Lerum Parish, Västergötland, Sweden
- Spouse: Maria Catharina Matsen (m. 1884)

Lars Harald Adolf Fleetwood (8 May 1815 – 11 August 1907) was a Swedish marine insurer and member of the Fleetwood family.

== Biography ==
Harald Fleetwood was born on 8 May 1815 at the Estate of Salaholm to Adolf Georg Fleetwood and Catharina Maria Reenstierna. He is a direct descendant of Sir George Fleetwood, founder of the Swedish cadet branch family, and grandfather of Harald Fleetwood, heraldist and courtier. In 1840, he graduated with a Bachelor of Science in Nautical Science degree and commanded several ships between 1840 and 1859. He organized the first domestic marine insurance in Sweden and co-developed Sjöförsäkringsbolaget AB Gauthiod in Gothenburg, of which he held office as director between 1862 and 1892. He participated in the drafting of maritime laws in 1878.
