= State Herald of Sweden =

Officer of the National Archives of Sweden

The State Herald (Swedish: Statsheraldiker, formerly Riksheraldiker), between 1953 and 1981 called the Director of the Heraldic Section of the National Record Office, is an officer of the National Archives of Sweden who is responsible for matters related to heraldry. Until 1953 the Riksheraldiker was the head of his own state agency, the National Heraldry Office (Riksheraldikerämbetet).

Since 1953, the Statsheraldiker has been the head of the Heraldry Board, operating under the authority of the National Archives. The Heraldry Board is Sweden's highest heraldic authority, regulating only public arms (i.e. national, county and municipal heraldry, and the arms of public offices), whereas the National Heraldry Office also registered personal heraldry (i.e. noble arms and burgher arms). No other northern European country has a corresponding heraldic authority, although the College of Arms in Britain and the Court of the Lord Lyon in Scotland are comparable.

The current State Herald of Sweden (since 2022) is Davor Zovko, and the Assistant State Herald (since 2010) is Carl Michael Raab. Henrik Dahlström is the heraldic artist, who succeeded Vladimir Sagerlund in 2011.

== List of National Heralds ==
- 1734–1765: Conrad Ludvig Transchiöld
- 1768–1772: Baron Daniel Tilas
- 1773–1809: Anders Schönberg
- 1809–1829: Jonas Carl Linnerhielm
- 1829–1855: Niklas Joakim af Wetterstedt
- 1855–1880: Baron August Wilhelm Stiernstedt
- 1880–1903: Carl Arvid Klingspor
- 1903–1931: Count Adam Ludvig Carl Lewenhaupt
- 1931–1953: Baron Harald Gustaf Fleetwood

== List of State Heralds ==
- 1953–1955: Gunnar Scheffer (acting)
- 1955–1975: Gunnar Scheffer
- 1975–1975: Lars-Olof Skoglund (acting)
- 1975–1981: Jan von Konow
- 1981–1983: Bo Elthammar (acting)
- 1983–1999: Clara Nevéus
- 1999–2022: Henrik Klackenberg
- 2022–present: Davor Zovko

== National Heraldry Office ==
The National Heraldry Office (Riksheraldikerämbetet) is thought to have existed in some form since the Middle Ages, because Swedish kings have been issuing grants of arms since the 15th century, but the history of the National Heraldry Office did not formally begin until the 1730s. The 16th century saw increased central authority in Sweden and the establishment of the House of Nobility, and King Johan III is said to have designed the arms for some of the grants of noble arms he issued.

When the College of Antiquities (Antikvitetskollegiet) was established in the 17th century, they employed heraldic artists. The first of these regularly employed heraldic artists was Elias Brenner, who produced many of the noble arms found at Riddarhuset. Brenner was succeeded by Nils Tungelfelt, who in turn was succeeded in 1703 by Carl Ludvig von Schantz. Brenner and von Schantz were particularly knowledgeable of heraldry and are still considered to be among the best national heralds in Sweden although the office was not yet even established.

Conrad Ludvig Transchiöld, who succeeded Carl Ludvig von Schantz upon his death in 1734, was the first to bear the title Riksheraldiker, and at this time the National Heraldry Office (Riksheraldikerämbetet) was formally established. Since the Estates had been abolished in 1865, the National Herald was no longer busy with noble arms, but he focused on other aspects of his heraldic duties. An instruction issued in 1885 stated no arms may be placed on public buildings, memorials, banners, standards or coins without first being approved by the National Herald. Decisions made by the National Herald could be appealed to the Royal Academy of Literature, History and Antiquities. During the 20th century, the National Heraldry Office was busy at first with establishing the national arms and flag and then increasingly with sorting out the arms which provinces, counties and cities had been using since earlier times, though many of these were heraldically dubious or even downright unheraldic. During the years 1934–1936 the National Heraldry Office even registered private burgher arms.

The National Heraldry Office ceased operations in 1953 and was incorporated into the National Archives and the National Herald (Riksheraldiker) was replaced by a "State Herald" (Statsheraldiker), because since the 19th century he increasingly only dealt with government arms.

== See also ==
- Swedish heraldry
- King of Arms
