= Davor Zovko =

State Herald of Sweden

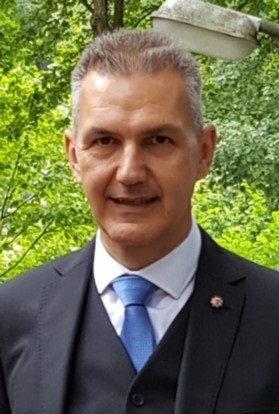
- Born: 28 May 1965 (age 61); Mostar, SR Bosnia
- Known for: State Herald of Sweden
- Spouse: Ružica Zovko (née. Stapić) m. 1995
- Children: 2

Davor Zovko (Croatian pronunciation: [‘davɔr zɔ:vko]; born 28 May 1965) is a Swedish and Croatian scientist, author, heraldist, musician and knight, who serves as State Herald of Sweden since 2022.

== Biography ==
Zovko is born and raised in Mostar. He is the son of Croatian author Ivan Zovko (1932-1987) and former athlete Branka b. Šunjić.

He graduated from the Mechanical Engineering School in Mostar in 1984 and 1989 as a teacher of language and literature from the University of Mostar. He received his master's degree in 2003 in social sciences and pedagogy from the Mälardalens University in Sweden. He defended his licentiate thesis in 2017 at the Örebro University in Sweden (social work and public administration). In his scientific work, Zovko focuses on the evaluation, management, and development of public administration.

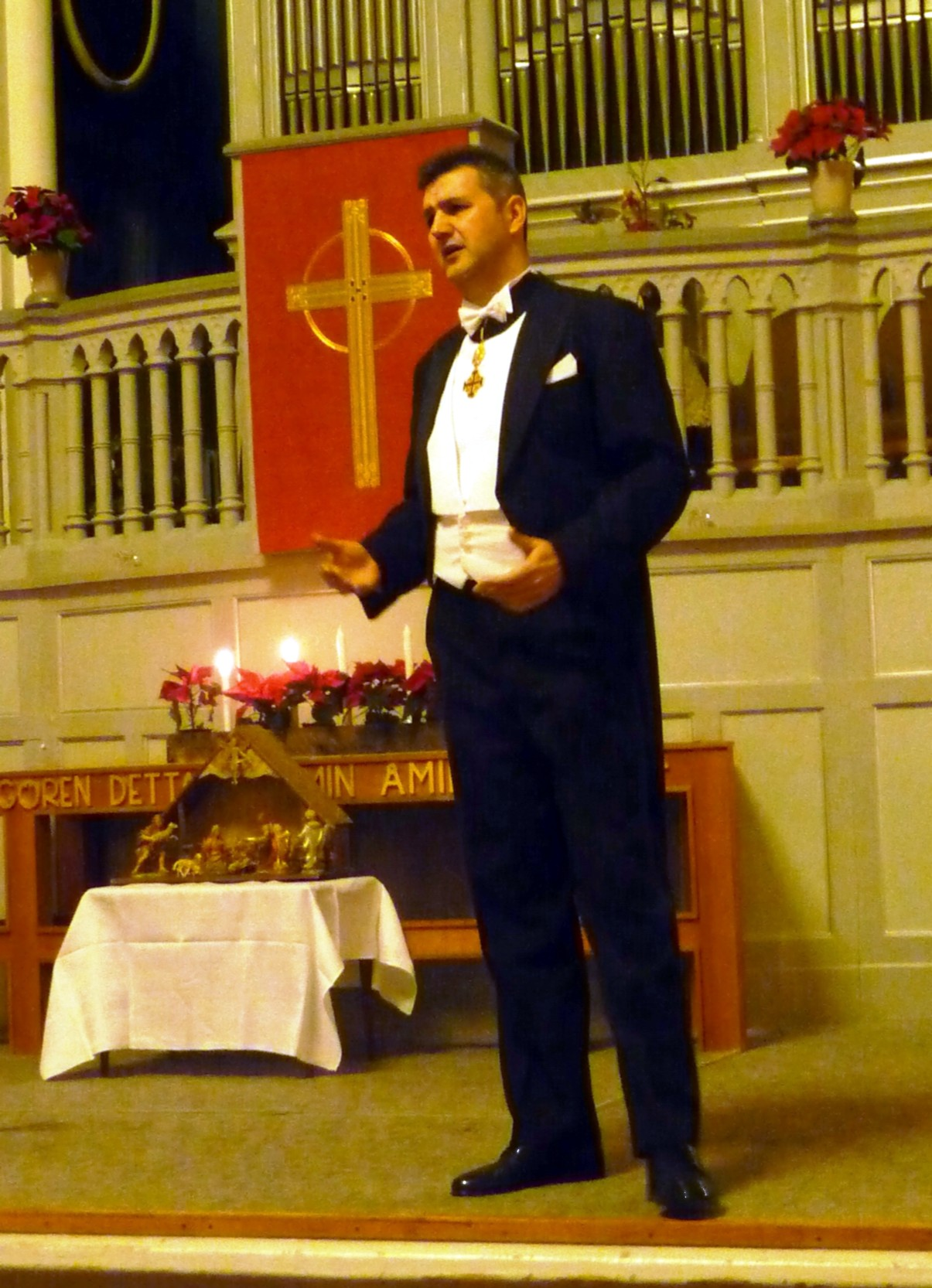
Zovko singing in a church in Eskilstuna

In the mid-1980s, Zovko began studying solo singing as a bass-baritone at the Music School in Mostar, first with prof. Jarmila Prpić, and later with prof. Amira Voljevica and prof. Orijana Vozila. Preparations with prof. Paša Gackić, for her regular class at the Sarajevo Music Academy, were interrupted by the Bosnian War. As a soloist, Zovko performed in Croatia, Germany, Denmark, United Kingdom and Sweden, among others. In 1998, he published, together with the American pianist and priest of the Swedish Lutheran Church Timothy Stayton, an album with solo songs of Ivan von Zajc. The purpose of this musical production, produced by Bo Edving and recorded in the Swedish studio Skyline, in collaboration with the Croatian Catholic Missions in Sweden, was, among other things, to present Croatian art music to Swedish audiences. Humanitarian concerts take a special place in Zovko's singing career. They were earlier performed for the purpose of giving aid to Zovko’s war-torn homeland, and later for supporting the Christian schools in the Holy Land. Zovko received several awards for his long-term humanitarian and cultural work.

Davor Zovko also runs his own company for heraldry and heraldic art and is considered by some to be one of the most famous heraldists and heraldic artists in Scandinavia. He composed a number of new coats of arms for private individuals, high church officials, associations, companies, and other organizations, as well as several celebrities. His heraldic images have been published in numerous coats of arms, books and articles. Since 1999, Zovko has been a member of the editorial board of the Scandinavian Roll of Arms. He is also a member of other heraldic associations and organizations. In addition to a rich artistic and journalistic production, Zovko's heraldic opus includes a series of lectures on heraldry and knighthood, including several master classes for professional heralds. Zovko's lectures were given in Bosnia and Herzegovina, Croatia, United Kingdom, Denmark and Sweden.

Zovko's bibliography includes primarily scientific books and articles, but much of his writing focuses on heraldry, the science of coats of arms, as well as on faleristics, the science of wearable medals (or equestrics, as he calls the science of chivalry in his book). Zovko writes about numerous topics in these fields, and the topic he deals with in his two books and numerous articles, is the difference between real orders of chivalry awarded by sovereign, recognized states, and private knightly associations that on their own initiative call themselves "chivalric orders". Among other things, Zovko emphasizes that the real orders of chivalry always belong to the public administration of sovereign states, while self-styled "orders", which are not awarded nor protected by a sovereign state, are only private associations such as book lovers' clubs, i.e., associations that any group of adult citizens can establish. In these associations, the citizens, so to speak, award "titles" to themselves why such “titles” are not real titles. Such “titles” are relevant only in the private spheres of these associations. In his professional career, Zovko has worked, among other things, as a scientist, researcher, evaluator, strategist and visiting university professor.

In 2004, Zovko received Accolade of Knight of the Holy Sepulchre of Jerusalem. Even before having received the Knighthood, he became Order’s first master of ceremonies in Sweden (2003-2007), and later he served as spokesman (2008-2012) and chancellor (2012-2016). He was also the first chancellor of the new, expanded Lieutenancy for Sweden and Denmark (2016-2020).

== State Herald of Sweden ==
Zovko has been appointed State Herald of Sweden in June 2022, succeeding Henrik Klackenberg, as an officer of the National Archives of Sweden (Riksarkivet) who is responsible for matters related to heraldry.

== Bibliography (a selection) ==
=== Scientific books and reports ===
- Heraldik – ett tema i högskoleuppsatser och ett ämne som motiverar till livslångt lärande. Master Thesis. Eskilstuna: Mälardalen University. 2003.
- En välinvesterad asyltid. En pedagogisk utvärdering av projektet MIA.* Eskilstuna: Mälardalen University. ISSN 1104-6384 2006.
- Att utbilda vävare och bygga vävstolar samtidigt. Utvärdering av Sveriges Kommuner och Landstings metodutvecklingsarbete med case management för människor med dubbla diagnoser. Together with Mats Ekermo PhD. Eskilstuna: Mälardalen University. ISBN 978-91-85231-04-1. 2007.
- Rapportering och kontroll i fokus. En studie av Arbetsförmedlingens utvärderingsverksamhet. Licentiate Thesis. Örebro: Örebro university and Mälardalens university. ISBN 978-91-7529-193-2. 2017.

=== Scientific Articles ===
- Användning av utvärderingar inom Arbetsförmedlingen. Together with Elinor Brunnberg PhD i Mats Ekermo PhD. Arbetsmarknad & Arbetsliv 22(1) 2016.
- Arbetsförmedlingens utvärderingsproduktion år 2010 och år 2015. En jämförande studie. Together with Elinor Brunnberg PhD i Mats Ekermo PhD. Arbetsmarknad & Arbetsliv 23(4) 2017.
- Arbetsförmedlares erfarenheter av Arbetsförmedlingens utvärderingsverksamhet. Arbetsmarknad & Arbetsliv 25(3-4) 2019.

=== Books on Heraldry and Phaleristics ===
- Obiteljski grb. Pravo na grb, nošenje grba, usvajanje nova grba. Zagreb: Laurana. ISBN 978-953-7354-07-7. 2009.
- Viteštvo danas. Što je zbilja, što je fantazija? Zagreb: Naklada Sv. Antuna. ISBN 978-953-7448-68-4. 2016.
- The Art of Heraldry – Approach to a Heraldic Work of Art. Stockholm: Riksarkivet. ISBN 978-91-87491-50-4. 2026.

=== Book Chapters on Heraldry and Phaleristics ===
- Biskop Jesper Swedbergs vapen. In Jesper Swedberg – en antologi. Skara: Stiftshistoriska Sällskap. 2008.
- Kristna riddarordnar – tusenåriga humanitära organisationer. In Acta Locumtenentiae Sueciae. Stockholm: Heliga gravens av Jerusalem riddarorden. 2011.
- Vapen Hagberg Exlibris Johannis. In Kyrka, kultur, historia. Skara: Stiftshistoriska Sällskap. 2012.
- Stormästarens heraldiska vapen. In Acta Locumtenentiae Sueciae. Stockholm: Heliga gravens av Jerusalem riddarorden. 2012.
- Den Heliga gravens av Jerusalem riddarordens historia i korta drag. InActa Locumtenentiae Sueciae. Stockholm: Heliga gravens av Jerusalem riddarorden. 2013.
- Chivalry – an important institution in our culture. In Acta Locumtenentiae Sueciae et Daniae. Stockholm: Heliga gravens av Jerusalem riddarorden. 2017.

=== Popular articles and other publications ===
Zovko has published a number of articles, reports, reviews, essays and other contributions in various publications, journals and newspapers.

== Titles and awards ==
- (Holy See) Knight Grand Cross of the Order of the Holy Sepulchre of Jerusalem Motu Proprio, 2016
- (Holy See) Knight Commander of the Order of St. Gregory the Great, 2020
- Knight of the Royal Neapolitan Sacred Military Constantinian Order of Saint George, 2010
- (Sweden) Golden medal of the Swedish Heraldic Society, 2011

Heraldic offices
| Preceded by Henrik Klackenberg | State Herald of Sweden; 2022–present | Incumbent |
