= Jonas Carl Linnerhielm =

Swedish nobleman and State Herald

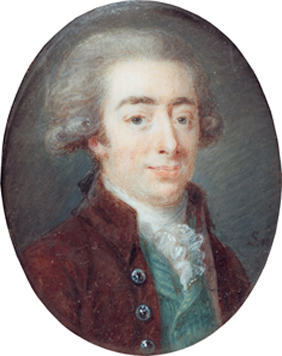
- Jonas Carl Linnerhielm Self-portrait
- Born: August 30, 1758; Elleholm, Blekinge, Sweden
- Died: February 12, 1829 (aged 70); Ebbetorp, Småland, Sweden
- Occupations: State Herald of Sweden, artist, writer.

Jonas Carl Linnerhielm (30 August 1758 – 12 February 1829) was a Swedish nobleman, State Herald of Sweden, artist and writer. He is arguably most well known for his accounts of his travels within Sweden, which he illustrated himself and published in three volumes between 1797 and 1816.

== Biography ==
Linnerhielm studied at the University of Lund and graduated in 1776. He pursued a career as a civil servant, holding different offices between 1776 and 1796. During this time he was taught drawing, and came under the influence of Elias Martin and his brother Johan Fredrik Martin. In 1795 his wife, Helena Maria Ehrenstråhle, published a short collection of poems to which Linnerhielm made illustrations. The illustrations are in the style of Salomon Gessner. It has been described as one of the best examples of Swedish book art during the 18th century.

In 1794, he inherited his father's manorial estate, Ebbetorp manor, in Småland. Two years later, he resigned from his official duties to concentrate his efforts on the running of the estate. In 1799–1800, he renovated the main house and created an English landscape garden on the grounds. Between 1797 and 1809, he published three volumes of travel accounts from Sweden, illustrated by himself (Bref under resor i Sverige (1797), Bref under nya resor i Sverige (1806) and Bref under senare resor i Sverige (1816)). These books are considered to be the first examples of purely recreational travel writing in Swedish. Linnerhielm has been called "the first Swedish tourist".

== Selected works ==
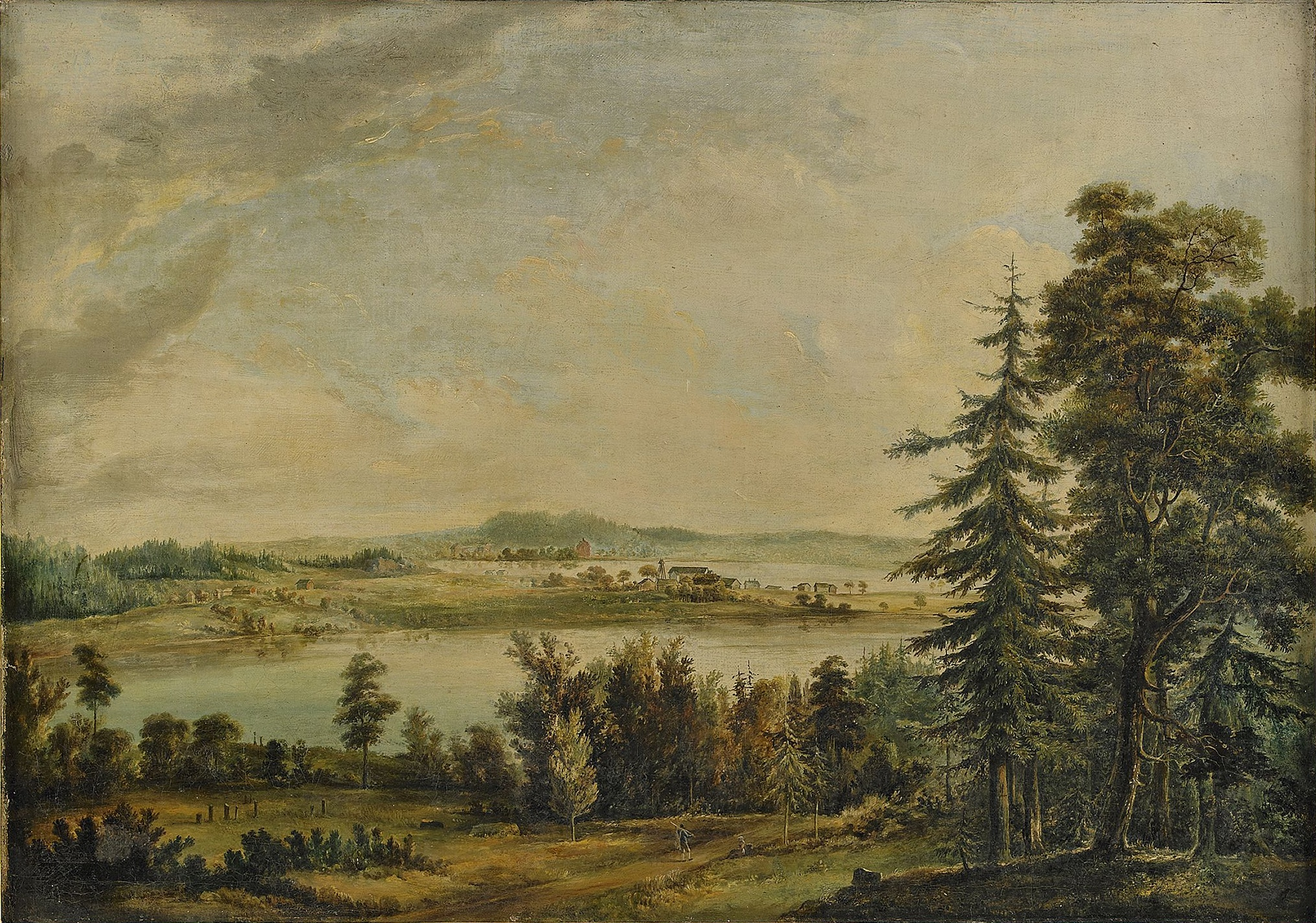
View over Hallsnäs mansion - Småland

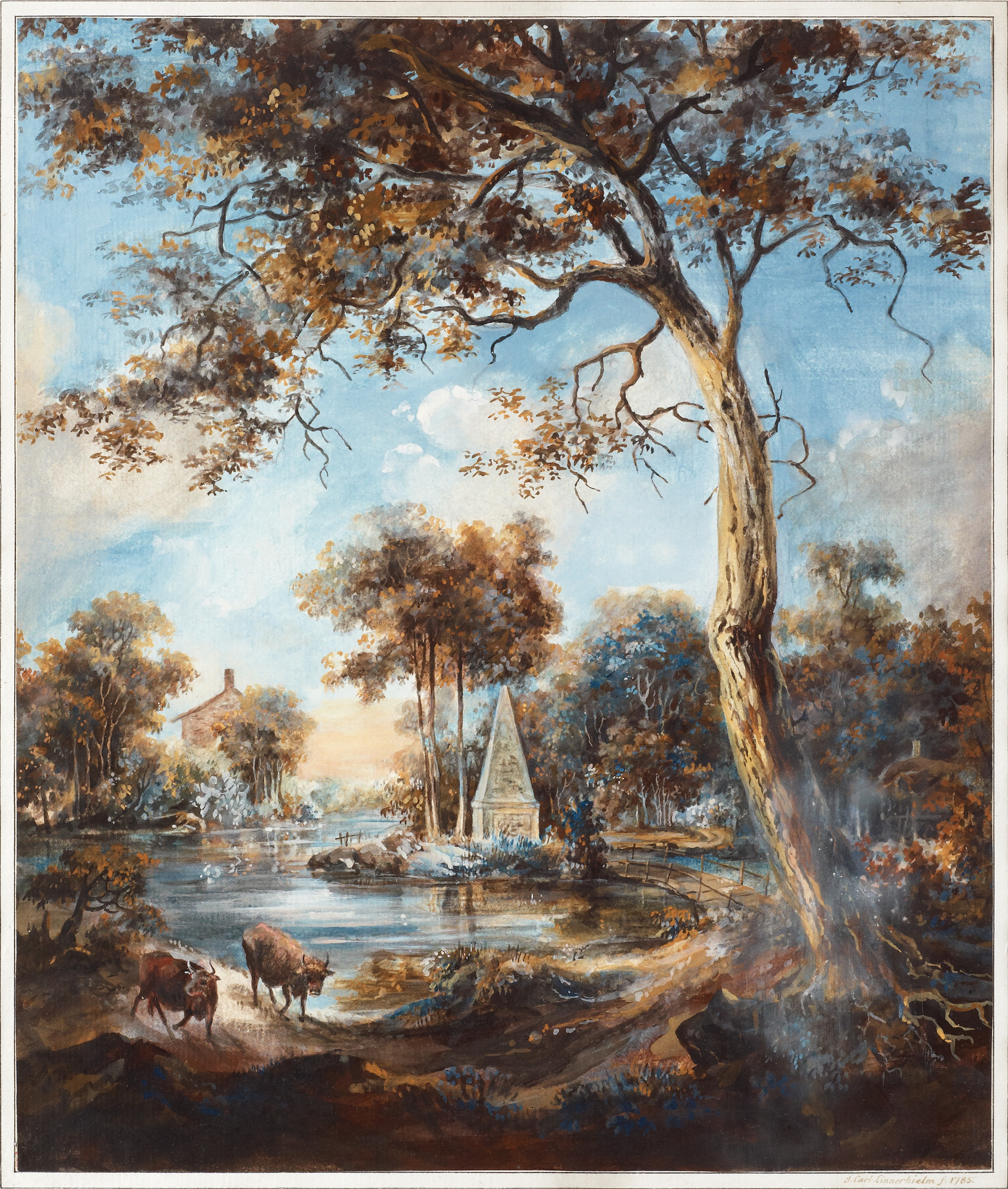
Lakeside landscape with cattle and buildings (1785)

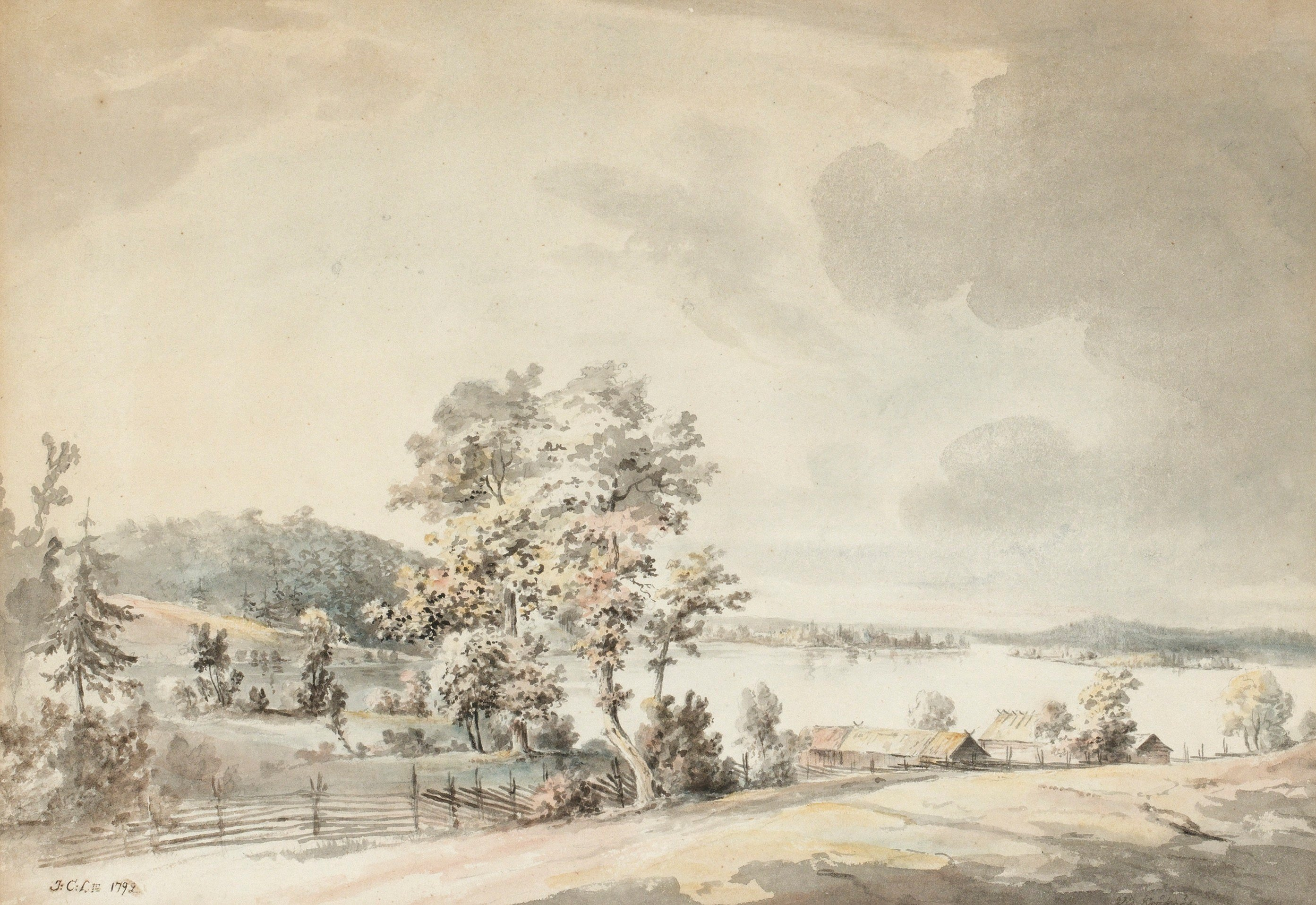
Landscape with cottages by a lake, Kråknäs (1792)

== Bibliography ==
- Schiller, Harald (1939). Jonas Carl Linnerhielm (PDF) (in Swedish). Stockholm: Albert Bonniers.
- Nordenson, Eva (2008). Mitt förtjusta öga. J. C. Linnerhielms voyages pittoresques i Sverige 1787-1807 (in Swedish). Malmö: Arena. ISBN 978-91-7843-273-8.
