= Arninge =

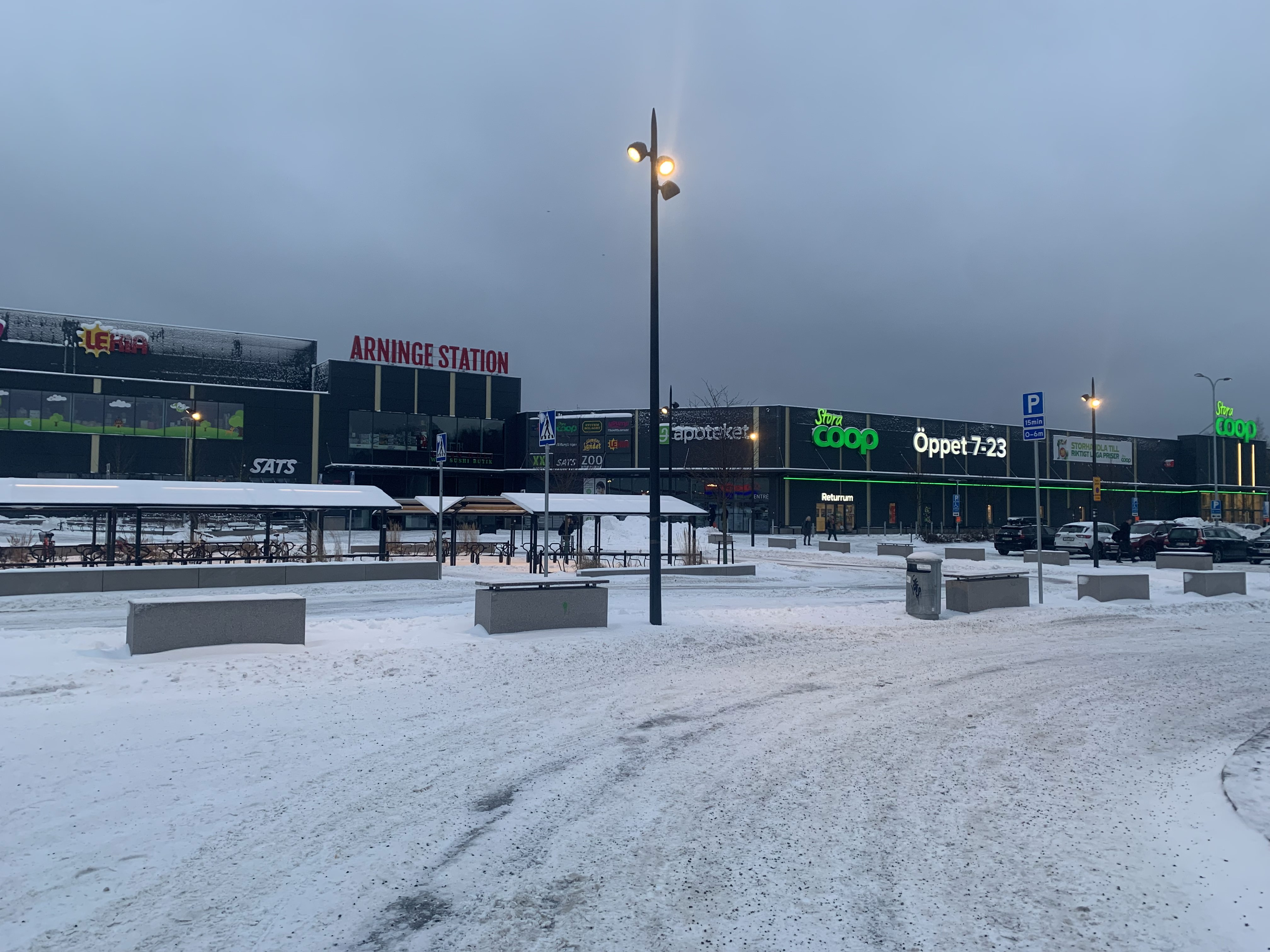

- Location within Stockholm Location within Sweden Location within European Union
- Coordinates: 59°27′59″N 18°7′48″E
- Country: Sweden
- Province: Uppland
- County: Stockholm County
- Municipality: Täby Municipality

Area
  - Total: 0.163 km^{2} (0.063 sq mi)

Population (2020)
  - Total: 1,978
- Time zone: UTC+1 (CET)
  - Summer (DST): UTC+2 (CEST)

Arninge is a locality situated in Täby Municipality, Stockholm County, Sweden. The district borders Österåker Municipality in the east, Vågsjö and Löttingelund in the north, and Rönninge in the south. Arninge is primarily a commercial and industrial area.

== History ==
Arninge's history stretches far back to the Iron Age, when the sea level was significantly higher than today and Arninge was an inland sea with archipelago-like nature. Even today, there are still traces of e.g. behind the newly built Flink's construction store and Andy's Lekland where several burial mounds and a small defensive wall (ancient castle) are still visible. Some graves are, however, excavated. There are still traces of sea bays with bare rocks and lakeside plants (reeds).

In the 1930s and 1940s, the military built bunkers here as part of the defense, the so-called sausage line. On the hill opposite K-Rauta there is a preserved one. In the mid-1940s, Arninge was an alternative to a new location for the Roslagen Anti-Aircraft Corps.

Residential construction began in the 2010s in the area. Ullna strand and Hägerneholm are called two emerging residential areas. From 2015 onwards, Statistics Sweden has defined a new urban area for these settlements with the name Arninge.
