= Harald Fleetwood (1879–1960) =

Swedish courtier and heraldist (1879–1960)

Baron Harald Fleetwood R-RJohO KNO1kl RVO1kl
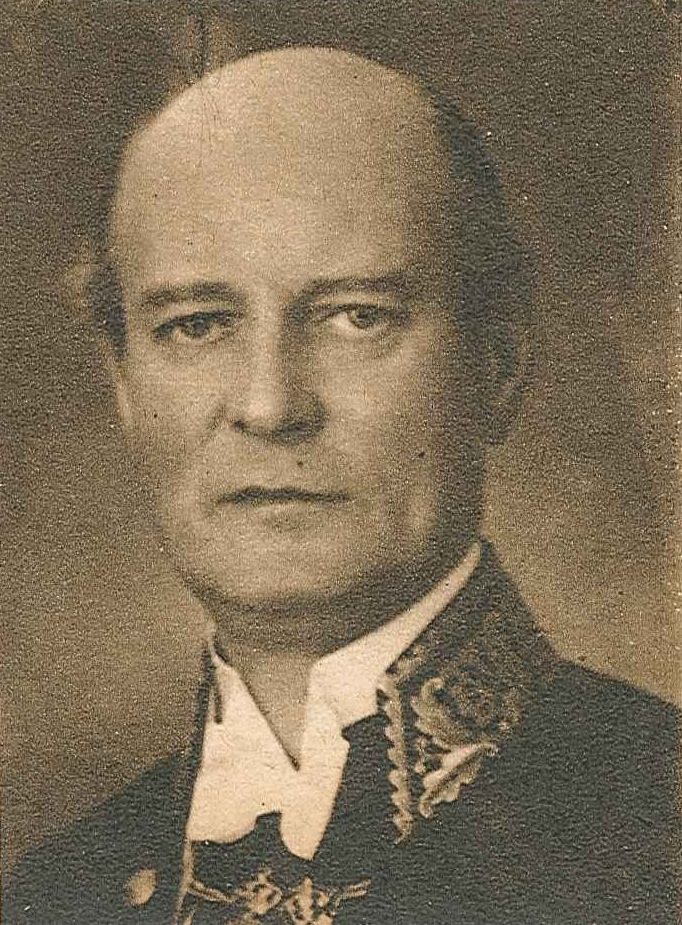
- Photograph from a 1942 (or earlier) Christmas issue of Vecko-Journalen, by unknown.

National Herald of Sweden
- In office 1931–1953
- Preceded by: Adam Lewenhaupt
- Succeeded by: none

Personal details
- Born: Harald Gustaf Fleetwood; 22 July 1879 Gothenburg Kristine Parish, Västergötland, Sweden
- Died: 5 August 1960 (aged 81) Saltsjöbaden Parish, Södermanland, Sweden
- Relatives: Fleetwood family

Harald Gustaf Fleetwood (22 July 1879 – 5 August 1960) was a Swedish heraldist and courtier, serving as the last National Herald between 1931 and 1953.

== Biography ==
Harald Fleetwood was born on 22 July 1879 in Gothenburg to Harder Georg Fleetwood, wholesale merchant and genealogist, and Amalia Björck, daughter of Gustaf Daniel Björck, bishop of Gothenburg. As a member of the Swedish branch of the Fleetwood family, his interest in heraldry and genealogy was acquired by his father. After graduating in 1901, he worked as an administrative assistant at the Museum of Cultural History in Lund between 1903 and 1906, and later continued his studies at the University of Cologne the following year.

He took office as secretary of the Royal Theatre between 1910–1919 and was a National Heraldry Office staff member in 1910 and onwards. He was also supplementary assistant of the National Archives, chamberlain and master of ceremonies in 1914, 1922 and 1930 respectively. In 1931 and 1933, he succeeded as National Herald and was member of the Royal Society for Publication of Manuscripts on Scandinavian History respectively.

He was a member of Concordia Catholica and buried on 13 August 1960 at the Catholic Cemetery, Northern Burial Grounds in Stockholm.

== Honours ==
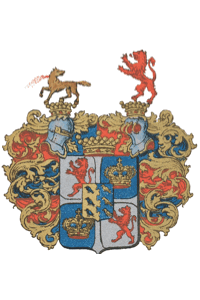
Baronial family arms of the Swedish branch of Fleetwood, as introduced to the House of Nobility.

=== National ===
- Sweden: Recipient of the King Gustaf V's 90th Jubilee Commemorative Medal (1948)
- Sweden: Commander 1st Class of the Order of the Polar Star (8 September 1939)
- Sweden: Recipient of the King Gustaf V's 70th Jubilee Commemorative Medal (1928)
- Sweden: Knight of the Order of the Polar Star (1928)
- Sweden: Knight 1st Class of the Order of Vasa (1923)
- Johanniter Order: Knight of Justice of the Order of Saint John in Sweden (between 1921 and 1925)

=== Foreign ===
- Holy See: Commander of the Order of Saint Gregory the Great (between 1947 and 1950)
- Knights of Malta: Knight of the Sovereign Military Order of Malta (between 1935 and 1940)
- Denmark: Commander 1st Class of the Order of the Dannebrog (between 1935 and 1940)
- Finland: Commander 1st Class of the Order of the White Rose of Finland (between 1935 and 1940)
- Norway: Commander with Star of the Order of Saint Olav (between 1935 and 1940)
- Belgium: Grand Officer of the Order of the Crown (between 1931 and 1935)
- France: Officier of the Legion of Honour (between 1931 and 1935)
- Spain: Commander 2nd Class of the Order of Civil Merit (between 1928 and 1931)
- Belgium: Commander of the Order of Leopold II (between 1925 and 1928)
- Denmark: Commander of the Order of the Dannebrog (between 1921 and 1925)
- Johanniter Order: Knight of the Order of Saint John (between 1918 and 1921)
