= National Archives of Sweden =

Coordinates: 59.3267°N 18.0228°E

- Riksarkivet

Agency overview
- Formed: 1618
- Jurisdiction: Government of Sweden
- Headquarters: Stockholm, Sweden
- Minister responsible: Parisa Liljestrand, Ministry of Culture
- Website: riksarkivet.se

The National Archives of Sweden (Swedish: Riksarkivet, RA) is the official archive of the Swedish government and is responsible for the management of records from Sweden's public authorities. Although the archives functions primarily as the government archive, it also preserves some documents from private individuals and non-public organizations. The mission of the archives is to collect and preserve records for future generations.

== Organization ==
The National Archives of Sweden is a state administrative authority, organized under the Ministry of Culture. The head of The National Archives, known as the Riksarkivarie in Swedish, works alongside staff responsible for strategic issues, and overall coordination and development. The position is currently held by Karin Åström Iko. Daniel Forsman has been appointed as her successor and will assume office in March 2026.

== History ==
The National Archives of Sweden is one of the oldest public authorities in Sweden, with roots that can be traced back to the Middle Ages. Beginning under King Gustav Vasa, an archive was created from previously collected older documents, some documents that were received, and documents drawn up in the Royal Office. On October 18, 1618 Axel Oxenstierna, the Lord High Chancellor (Rikskansler) of the Privy Council, issued a Chancellor's Order to appoint a special secretary, along with two writers, to be responsible for the archive, thus creating the National Archives as an institution. Over time, the archive became less important for the activities of the Chancellor, and more valuable for historical researchers. However, it was not until 1878 that the National Archives was established as an independent authority.

In a fire in 1419, not only the Tre Kronor castle in Stockholm, but the entire city was affected, including the town hall and the city archives which were completely destroyed. In 1697 a fire at the Tre Kronor castle in Stockholm destroyed a large portion of the Archives, resulting in a severe loss of items and documents from the Middle Ages. Out of 24,500 books and 1,400 manuscripts, only 6,000 books and 400 manuscripts could be salvaged, respectively. One of Sweden's most famous books, The Silver Bible (Silverbibeln), or Codex Argenteus, was purportedly thrown out the castle window to save it from the flames.

The National Archives was originally limited to the Royal Office, but over time the National Archives has subsumed responsibility for archives of other central and local authorities.

=== Regional Archives ===
In order to preserve documents from regional and local governments, regional archives were created in seven cities from 1899 to 1935. The Archives of Vadstena was the first regional archive to open in 1899. Regional archives in Lund and Uppsala both opened in 1903, Visby in 1905, Gothenburg in 1911, Östersund in 1928, and finally in Härnösand in 1935. The Regional Archives (Landsarkiven) were merged with the National Archives (Riksarkivet) in 2010 under a joint authority.

=== Military Archives ===
The Military Archives (Swedish: Krigsarkivet) were created in 1805. Formerly an independent authority, The Military Archives were incorporated into the National Archives in 1995. The archive stores a unique and comprehensive collections of maps, including historical maps of Sweden, hand-written foreign topographical maps, and city fortification plans.

=== National Herald Board ===
The National Herald Board was closed in 1953, and the state's heraldic operations continued as a department under the National Archives. The department deals with questions about coat of arms design, flags and emblems and continuously produces new heraldic images for newly formed governmental bodies, counties, etc. The head of the National Herald Board held the title of National Herald, but in the new organization the title instead became State Herald (Statsheraldiker).

In 2007, the Swedish military altered the image of the heraldic lion depicted on the Nordic Battlegroup's coat of arms, removing the lion's penis to promote a more gender neutral image following protests from female soldiers. The creator of the image at the National Archives, Vladimir A. Sagerlund, made the news in Sweden over his staunch disapproval of the change.

== Holdings ==
The oldest document in the National Archives (listed in 2005) is a parchment from a missal, written in England in the late 10th century. The document came to Sweden via the British Christian missionary in Norway. Under King Gustav Vasa in the 16th century, archiving expanded and national registry and chamber books, land records, and diplomatic treaties were collected in the National Archives. Scrolls in Cyrillic writing from Novgorod were preserved in memory of the Swedish occupation from 1611 to 1617. There is a wide variety of materials available, including documents from the ministry, parliament, and central authorities. Documentation of government decisions from the 1840s to 1980s are available to researchers. Around 100,000 maps and drawings of state civilian buildings from 1697 to 1993 are preserved in the archive.

Although the primary focus of the National Archives is government records, there are also some personal archives, which were in the past obtained via confiscations and seizures, and more recently as donations. Personal collections include feudal archives from the 17th and 18th century, such as the Skokloster collection, Sjöholms, Stafsund and Ericsberg archives, and other archives of statesmen and cultural personalities. There are also some archives of non-governmental associations and businesses, as well as news archives.

In 2015 the archival holdings amounted to approximately 750 kilometers of shelving - comprising mainly parchment and paper. The digital media holdings included 130 million digital images. The amount of documents increases continuously because of the delivery of documents from the Cabinet Office and other central agencies.

=== Novgorod Occupation Archives ===
The "Novgorod occupation archives" (Swedish: Ockupationsarkivet från Novgorod) is the name used since the 1960s for a unique collection of documents in the National Archives. They are written in Russian by Russian administrators of the city of Veliky Novgorod during the years 1611–1617 when the Swedish army occupied the city. The documents include both originals and copies that were intended to be sent to Moscow. When the Swedish army withdrew from the city, the commander Jacob De la Gardie collected these documents as useful evidence for the peace negotiations and brought them back to his quarters in Estonia. Later the collection was sent to Stockholm, where its importance as a source of Russian history was recognized in the mid-19th century. They were first catalogued in 1964 by Russian historian Sergei Dmitrievsky. An improved catalogue was printed and published in 2005. The documents (which comprise 30,000 pages) were initially microfilmed, and the monochrome microfilm later digitized. This digital archive is available online. The collection consists of two series. Series 1 has 141 books and series 2 has 368 scrolls.

=== Digital Collections and Access ===
The National Archives is subject to open government, which means that the holdings in general are available to the public - including researchers and research-related individuals. The exception is made for confidential documents or certain perishable older material. Many of the oldest documents are, however, reproduced on microfilm or as digital images.

In 2017, the Swedish Parliament (Riksdag) awarded the Swedish National Archives 10 million SEK in order to make its digital collections available to the public free of charge. The subscription charge for the digital collections was removed on February 1, 2018, and the Archives has announced further plans to move towards open and free access. There are currently 180 million pages digitized, of which 65.5 million are accessible through the digital reading room (SVAR). The National Archives is also responsible for the development and administration of Sweden's national portal for open data and public sector information, and future plans will focus on making the digital collections accessible as open, linkable, and machine-readable data that will be integrated into the open data from the public sector.

=== Newspapers ===
In 2018, the research foundation Acadia donation 30 million SEK to digitize all of the copyright-free Swedish newspapers preserved by the Royal Library (KB), estimated at 1,250 titles. Newspapers older than 115 years are free from copyright and when the project is expected to complete in 2022, the digitized newspapers will extend up to the year 1906. The Royal Library and the National Archives have collaborated on digitization since 2010, and the digitization will take place at the National Archives Unit for Digitalization Media Conversion Center (MKC).

== Regulations ==
The National Archives regulations RA-FS and RA-MS are legal rules for government agencies and other groups that store public records from government archives. The regulations dictate how the documents should be created, organized, reported, deleted, stored, and submitted to the repository.

== Photos ==
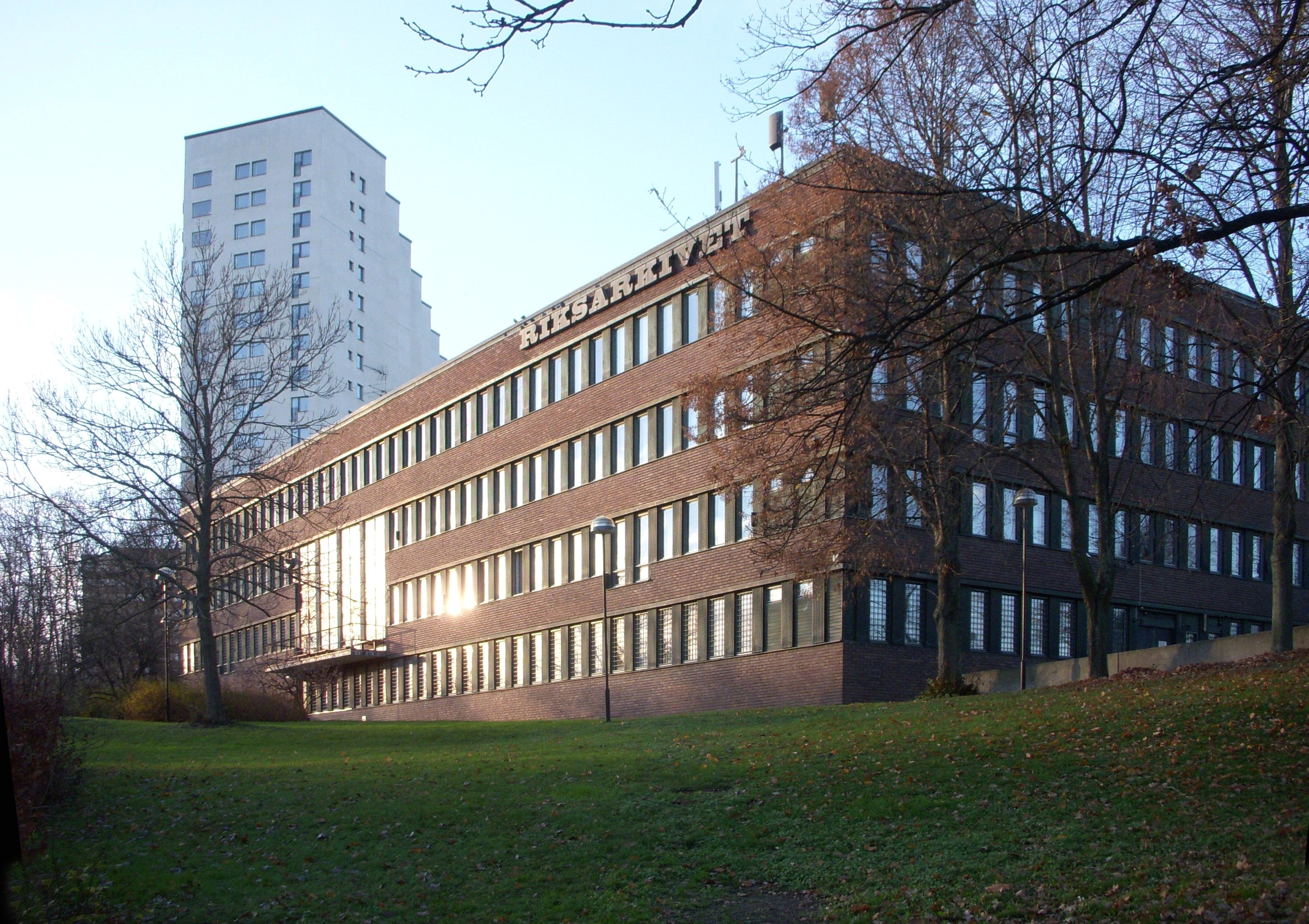
Main building of the Swedish National Archives in Stockholm

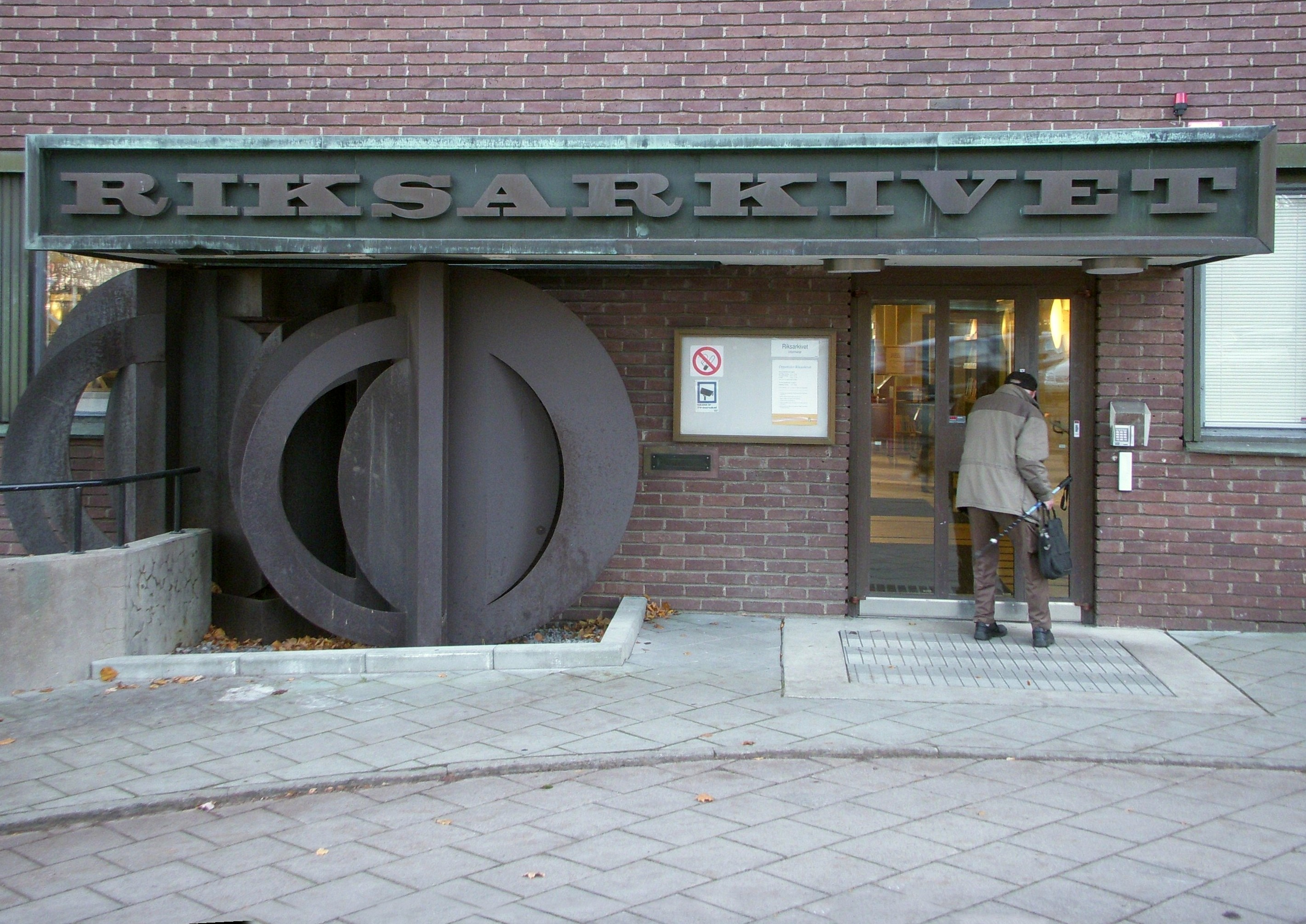
Entrance to the main building in Stockholm

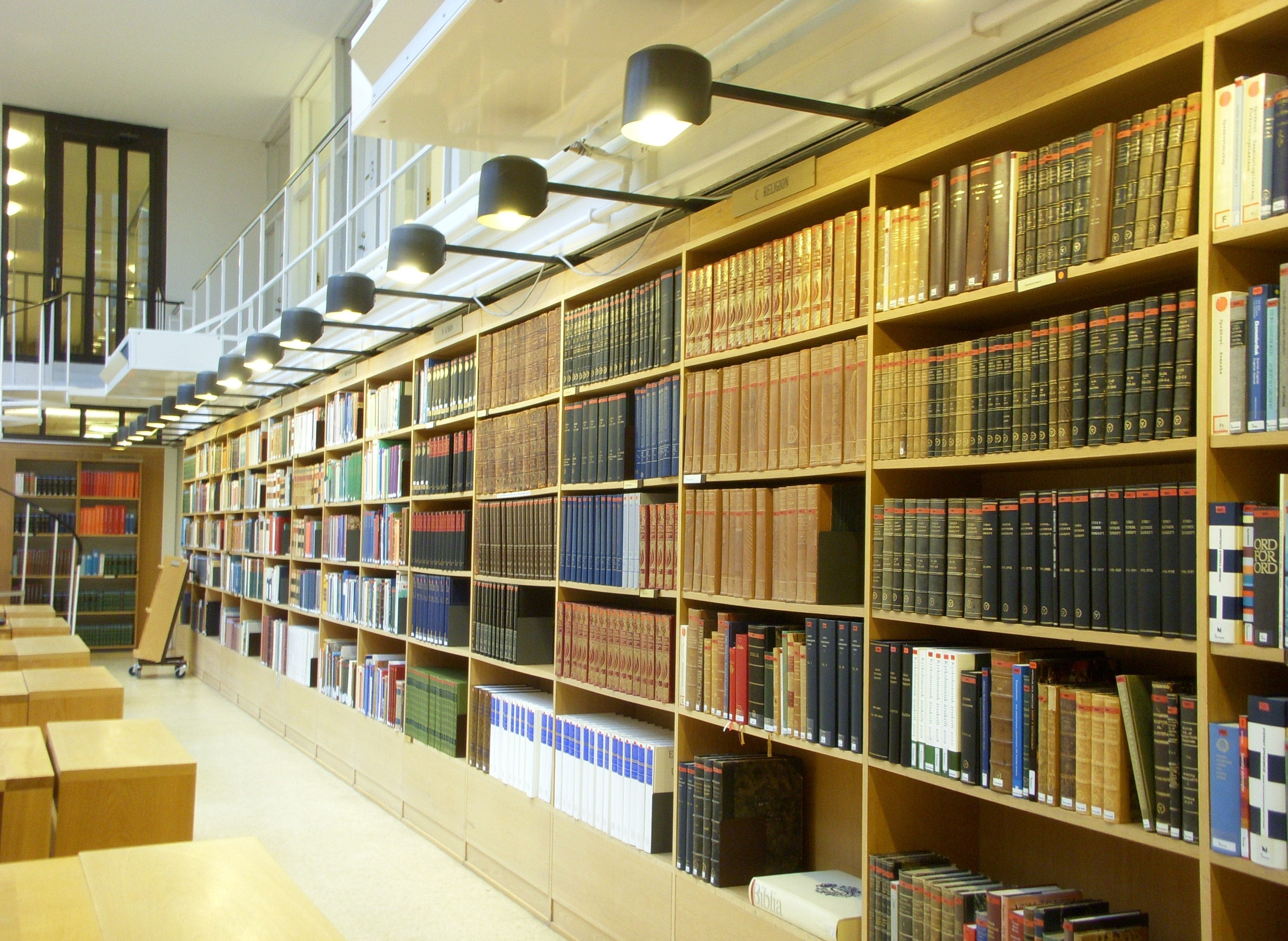
Research room in the main building in Stockholm

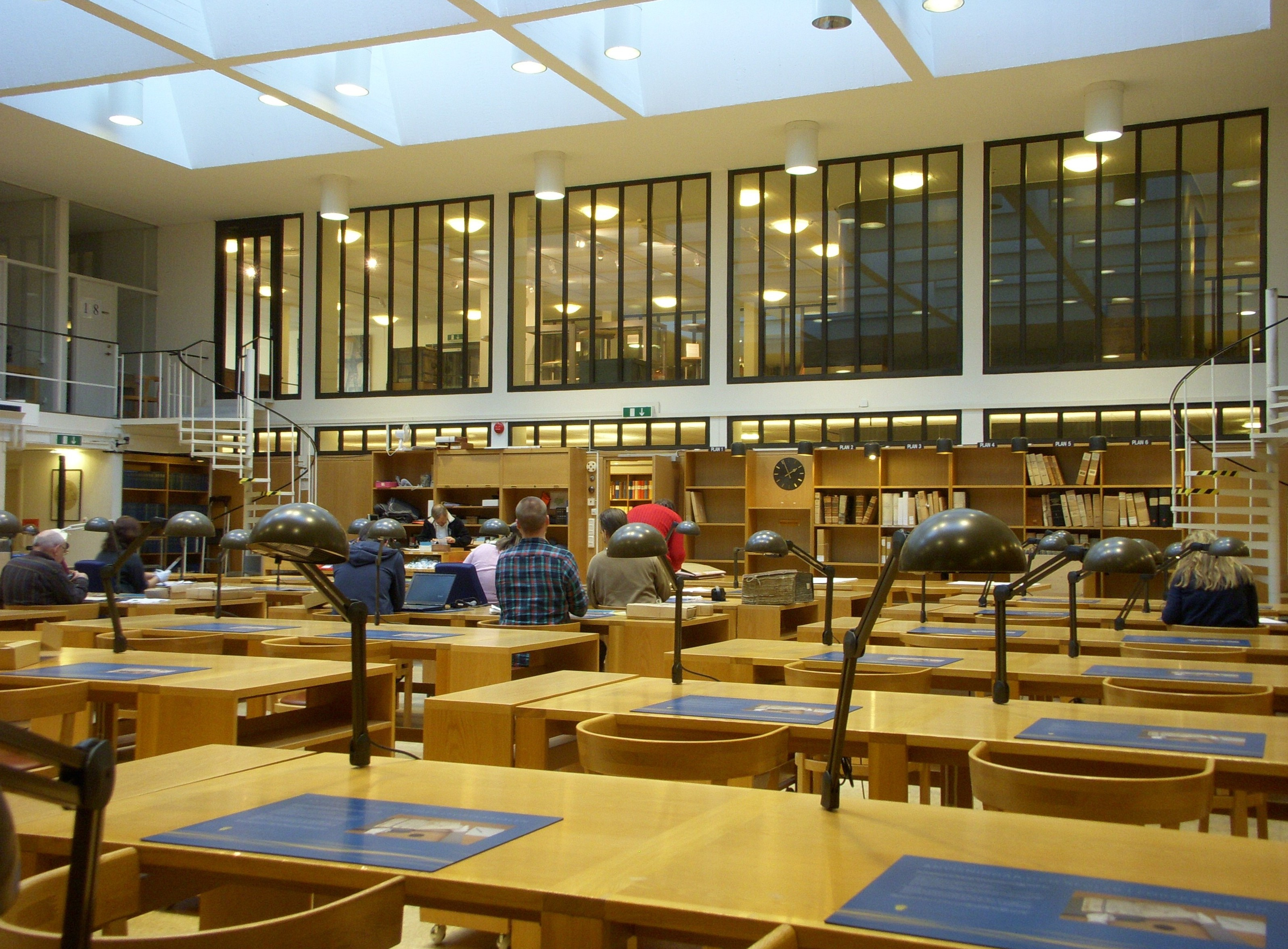
Research room in the main building in Stockholm

== See also ==
- List of national archives
- Gamla Riksarkivet
- Swedish heraldry
