= List of English flags =

This is a list of English flags, including symbolic national and sub-national flags, standards and banners used exclusively in England. The College of Arms is the authority on the flying of flags in England and maintains the only official register of flags. It was established in 1484 and as part of the Royal Household operates under the authority of The Crown. A separate private body called the Flag Institute, financed by its own membership, also maintains a registry of United Kingdom flags that it styles 'the UK Flag Registry', though this has no official status under English law.

Certain classes of flag enjoy a special status within English planning law and can be flown without needing planning permission as advertisements. These include any country's national flag, civil ensign or civil air ensign; the flag of the Commonwealth, the United Nations or any other international organisation of which the United Kingdom is a member; a flag of any island, county, district, borough, burgh, parish, city, town or village within the United Kingdom; the flag of the Black Country, East Anglia, Wessex, any Part of Lincolnshire, any Riding of Yorkshire or any historic county within the United Kingdom; the flag of St David; the flag of St Patrick; the flag of any administrative area within any country outside the United Kingdom; any flag of His Majesty's Armed Forces; the Armed Forces Day flag; and the flags of the National Health Service. The flag of the European Union previously held this special status but this was revoked and instead granted to the flags of the NHS on 24 March 2021, owing to heightened advocacy for the latter institution brought about by the COVID-19 pandemic and following the United Kingdom's departure from the European Union on 31 January 2020. The flag of the Council of Europe, identical to the flag of the European Union, is allowed to be flown however.

== National flag ==
Flag	Date	Use	Description
	1417–Present	Flag of England (also known as the St George's Cross)	A centred red cross on a white background, 3:5.
	1417–Present	Flag of England (also known as the St George's Cross)	A vertical centred red cross on a white background.

== Royal banner ==
Flag	Date	Use	Description
	1042–1066	Former Royal Banner of England (Attributed)	A golden cross with fleur-de-lis ends over a blue field, surrounded by five golden martlets. This former Royal Banner was used by St Edward the Confessor, one of the last Anglo-Saxon English kings.
	circa 1200	Present Royal Banner of England	Three gold lions (or leopards) passant on a red field. The Royal Banner of England is based on the Royal arms of England. The banner is neither a national flag or a royal standard, and only represents the ruling monarch exclusively in England. The Banner of England is included within the current Royal Standard, along with heraldic devices from the other constituent parts of the United Kingdom.

== Royal standards ==
Flag	Date	Use	Description
		Standard of the Duchy of Lancaster	The Royal Banner of England, with a three-point label, each containing three fleurs-de-lis
	1305	Standard of the Lord Warden of the Cinque Ports	A banner of the Lord's coat of arms, featuring three lions passant guardant conjoined to three hulls, all in gold

== Church ==
Flag	Date	Use	Description
	1417–Present	Flag of England (also known as the St George's Cross)	A centred red cross on a white background, 3:5. Churches belonging to the Church of England which have a pole may fly St George's Cross. A desirable variant is for the church to fly the flag with the arms of the diocese in the canton (left-hand upper corner).
		Flag of Westminster Abbey	Tudor arms between Tudor roses, above arms attributed to Edward the Confessor
		Flag of the Church of St Margaret, Westminster Abbey	A blue flag defaced in the centre with a gold dragon's head pierced by a cross, and a gold crowned portcullis in the canton.
	2014	Flag of Exeter Cathedral	The coat of arms of Exeter Cathedral on a field of blue.
		Flag of Southwark Cathedral	A banner of the Cathedral's coat of arms.
		Flag of Worcester Cathedral	The Cross of Saint George defaced with the coat of arms of Worcester Cathedral in the canton.
	2013	Flag of the Church of St James the Great, Birlingham	The Cross of Saint George impaled with a blue field defaced with three gold scallop shells of Saint James (two on the left and one on the right).
		Flag of St James Church, Quedgeley	Three gold scallop shells of Saint James (two above and one below) on a field of red.
		Flag of Saint Aldhelm	A white cross on a red field.
	2021	Flag of Saint Augustine of Canterbury	A white cross on a black field with a gold bishop's pallium topped by a small gold cross in the canton.
		Flag of Saint Edmund the Martyr	A red Saint George's Cross on a white field, defaced in the centre with a blue shield bearing two crossed gold arrows passing through a gold crown.
		Flag of Saint Peter, Westminster Abbey	Two crossed gold keys beneath a gold ring on a field of red. The symbols represent the two Patron Saints of the Abbey: the ring of Saint Edward the Confessor (founder of the Abbey), and the keys of Saint Peter.
		Flag of Saint Richard of Chichester	A white cross on a red field with a white chalice in each quarter.

=== Dioceses of the Church of England ===
Flag	Date	Use	Description
		Flag of the Diocese of Bath and Wells	Cross of St. George with the heraldic shield of the Diocese of Bath and Wells in the canton.
		Flag of the Diocese of Birmingham	Cross of St. George with the heraldic shield of the Diocese of Birmingham in the canton.
		Flag of the Diocese of Blackburn	Cross of St. George with the heraldic shield of the Diocese of Blackburn in the canton.
		Flag of the Diocese of Bradford	Cross of St. George with the heraldic shield of the Diocese of Bradford in the canton.
		Flag of the Diocese of Bristol	Cross of St. George with the heraldic shield of the Diocese of Bristol in the canton.
		Flag of the Diocese of Canterbury	Cross of St. George with the heraldic shield of the Diocese of Canterbury in the canton.
		Flag of the Diocese of Carlisle	Cross of St. George with the heraldic shield of the Diocese of Carlisle in the canton.
		Flag of the Diocese of Chelmsford	Cross of St. George with the heraldic shield of the Diocese of Chelmsford in the canton.
		Flag of the Diocese of Chester	Cross of St. George with the heraldic shield of the Diocese of Chester in the canton.
		Flag of the Diocese of Chichester	Cross of St. George with the heraldic shield of the Diocese of Chichester in the canton.
		Flag of the Diocese of Coventry	A banner of the Diocese's coat of arms.
		Flag of the Diocese of Derby	Cross of St. George with the heraldic shield of the Diocese of Derby in the canton.
		Flag of the Diocese of Durham	A banner of the Diocese's coat of arms.
		Flag of the Diocese of Ely	Cross of St. George with the heraldic shield of the Diocese of Ely in the canton.
		Flag of the Diocese of Exeter	Cross of St. George with the heraldic shield of the Diocese of Exeter in the canton.
		Flag of the Diocese of Gibraltar in Europe	Cross of St. George with the heraldic shield of the Diocese of Gibraltar in Europe in the canton.
		Flag of the Diocese of Gloucester	Cross of St. George with the heraldic shield of the Diocese of Gloucester in the canton.
		Flag of the Diocese of Guildford	Cross of St. George with the heraldic shield of the Diocese of Guildford in the canton.
		Flag of the Diocese of Hereford	Cross of St. George with the heraldic shield of the Diocese of Hereford in the canton.
		Flag of the Diocese of Leeds	Cross of St. George with the heraldic shield of the Diocese of Leeds in the canton.
		Flag of the Diocese of Leicester	Cross of St. George with the heraldic shield of the Diocese of Leicester in the canton.
		Flag of the Diocese of Lichfield	Cross of St. George with the heraldic shield of the Diocese of Lichfield in the canton.
		Flag of the Diocese of Lincoln	Cross of St. George with the heraldic shield of the Diocese of Lincoln in the canton.
		Flag of the Diocese of London	Cross of St. George with the heraldic shield of the Diocese of London in the canton.
		Flag of the Diocese of Manchester	Cross of St. George with the heraldic shield of the Diocese of Manchester in the canton.
		Flag of the Diocese of Newcastle	Cross of St. George with the heraldic shield of the Diocese of Newcastle in the canton.
		Flag of the Diocese of Norwich	Cross of St. George with the heraldic shield of the Diocese of Norwich in the canton.
		Flag of the Diocese of Oxford	Cross of St. George with the heraldic shield of the Diocese of Oxford in the canton.
		Flag of the Diocese of Portsmouth	Cross of St. George with the heraldic shield of the Diocese of Portsmouth in the canton.
		Flag of the Diocese of Rochester	Cross of St. George with the heraldic shield of the Diocese of Rochester in the canton.
		Flag of the Diocese of Salisbury	Cross of St. George with the heraldic shield of the Diocese of Salisbury in the canton.
		Flag of the Diocese of Sheffield	Cross of St. George with the heraldic shield of the Diocese of Sheffield in the canton.
		Flag of the Diocese of Southwark	Cross of St. George with the heraldic shield of the Diocese of Southwark in the canton.
		Flag of the Diocese of Southwell and Nottingham	Cross of St. George with the heraldic shield of the Diocese of Southwell and Nottingham in the canton.
		Flag of the Diocese of St Albans	Cross of St. George with the heraldic shield of the Diocese of St Albans in the canton.
		Flag of the Diocese of Truro	Cross of St. George with the heraldic shield of the Diocese of Truro in the canton.
		Flag of the Diocese of Winchester	Cross of St. George with the heraldic shield of the Diocese of Winchester in the canton.
		Flag of the Diocese of Worcester	Cross of St. George with the heraldic shield of the Diocese of Worcester in the canton.
		Flag of the Diocese of York	A banner of the Diocese's coat of arms.

== Regional flags ==
Flags of the former heptarchy of Anglo-Saxon kingdoms are registered as provincial flags:

Flag	Date	Represents	Description
	1900s	Kingdom of East Anglia (Note: Registered by the Flag Institute, a UK vexillology organisation that documents, guides and promotes the design, research and use of flags, but does not hold official status or authority.); East Anglia and surrounding areas	The arms ascribed to the Wuffingas dynasty. Three crowns on a blue shield, superimposed on a St George's Cross, 3:5.
	Ancient	Kingdom of Essex; Historic county flag of Essex	The flag of Essex is ancient in origin and features three Saxon seax (cutlasses) on a red field.
	1605	Kingdom of Kent; Historic county of Kent	The flag of Kent has a red field with a white horse in the centre, 3:5.
	13th century	Kingdom of Mercia; The Midlands	The Flag of Mercia, gold saltire on a blue field (Cross of St Alban), still flown on Tamworth Castle and a lighter version in St Albans.
	Ancient	Kingdom of Northumbria (Note: Designed by the College of Arms, the only legal body to grant official arms.); North England	Eight alternating stripes of gold and burgundy (Note: Historic: gold and purple; alternative: gold and red; registered: gold and burgundy)
	Ancient	Kingdom of Sussex	Six gold martlets on a blue field. Officially adopted on 20 May 2011, 3:5.
	1974	Kingdom of Wessex; Areas of England once covered by the kingdom	A gold wyvern on a red field. Registered 20 May 2011. Designed in 1974 by William Crampton.

== Historic counties ==
All 39 of the historic counties have flags registered with the Flag Institute, with Leicestershire being the last county to declare its flag, as of 16 July 2021. Some flags are traditional, meaning their designs have long been associated with the county (or in some cases, such as Kent and Sussex, an ancient kingdom), while other flags are based on the County Council arms or are winners of recent design competitions. The dates indicate the flag's date of first appearance, description, or in more recent examples, its registration with the Flag Institute.

Flag	Date	Use	Description
	Traditional; 12 April 1951	Flag of Bedfordshire^{reg} ^{coa}	Traditional county flag. The red and yellow colours come from the Beauchamps family coat of arms. The vertical black stripe with three shells, or escallops, comes from the arms of the Dukes of Bedford. The wavy lines represent the River Great Ouse. A slightly updated version was registered with the Flag Institute on 14 September 2014 after Bedfordshire County Council was disbanded and replaced by two unitary authorities.
	Traditional; 2 March 2017	Flag of Berkshire^{reg}	Traditional badge: a stag beneath Herne the Hunter's oak.
	Traditional; 20 May 2011	Flag of Buckinghamshire^{reg}	Traditional county flag. A field party per pale of black and red with a white swan, an emblem dating back to Anglo-Saxon times when Buckinghamshire was known for breeding swans for the king.
	1 February 2015	Flag of Cambridgeshire^{reg}	The three gold crowns represent East Anglia, with wavy light blue lines representing the river Cam in the colours of Cambridge University on a dark blue background.
	3 May 1938	Flag of Cheshire	Three golden sheaves of wheat and a golden blade on a blue background. The design has been associated with the Earldom of Chester since the 12th century, and has been used in the coat of arms of Chester since at least 1560.
	19th century	Flag of Cornwall	St Pirran's Cross, a white cross on a black field. The first definitive reference to it is in an 1838 work entitled ‘The Parochial History of Cornwall’ by Davies Gilbert.
	19 September 1950	Flag of Cumberland	Design based on the arms of the former Cumberland County Council. The pattern symbolises the coastline and famous lakes with the blue and white wavy lines, whilst the green upper half with Grass-of-Parnassus flowers recalls the marshy up-lands and fertile plains of the county.
	22 September 2006	Flag of Derbyshire^{reg}	A green cross with a white border on a sky blue field, with a gold Tudor rose in the centre, 3:5. The green symbolises Derbyshire’s lush verdant countryside. The cross indicates Derbyshire’s geography at the centre of the country. At the centre of the cross is a Tudor rose, whose usage in the county can be traced back to at least the late 16th century.
	23 July 2006	Flag of Devon, alias St Petroc's Cross^{reg}	A white cross with a black border on a green field, 3:5.
	16 September 2008	Flag of Dorset – The Dorset Cross, aka St Wite's Cross^{reg}	A white cross with a red border on a gold field, 3:5.
	21 November 2013	Flag of County Durham	A gold and blue horizontal bicolour with St Cuthbert's Cross countercharged upon it, 3:5.
	Ancient	Flag of Essex^{reg}	A red field with three white, gold hilted seax (Saxon swords). The three white seaxes (short Saxon swords) with gold pommels on a red field were the arms ascribed to the ancient kingdom of the East Saxons, or Essex, by Richard Verstegan in his 1605 work “A Restitution of Decayed Intelligence”.
	March 2008	Flag of Gloucestershire – The Severn Cross^{reg}	A mid-blue cross, outlined in cream, against an apple green background – the winning entry in a competition to commemorate the county's millennium. The green is representative of the rural county, the blue, the River Severn and the yellow, Cotswold Stone.
	12 March 2019	Flag of Hampshire^{reg}	A gold Saxon crown above a Tudor rose over a field of red and gold representing the former Saxon kingdom of Wessex, used in the county for several centuries.
	2 November 2019	Flag of Herefordshire^{reg}	On a dark red background, a white bull's head above three wavy lines, ordered white-blue-white. The red reflects the famed red earth of the county, while the bull’s head is from the famed Hereford breed.
	19 November 2008	Flag of Hertfordshire^{reg} ^{coa}	Against eight blue and white wavy lines, representing the county's rivers, a gold shield bearing a resting deer or hart.
	25 June 2009	Flag of Huntingdonshire^{reg}	On a green background, a gold, ribboned hunting horn – a flag displayed on the crest of the district council (and former county council) arms
	1605	Flag of Kent^{reg}	A red field with a white horse in the centre, 3:5. As with Essex, the emblem of this early English kingdom was first recorded in print in the 1605 work “A Restitution Of Decayed Intelligence” by Richard Verstegan.
	Modern form since 20 November 2008	Flag of Lancashire^{reg}	The Red Rose of Lancashire on a yellow field (originally a white field). The royal badge of a red rose was first used by Edmund Crouchback (1245-1296) the first Earl of Lancaster.
	16 July 2021	Flag of Leicestershire^{reg}	A red and white dancetté background, taken from the arms of Simon de Montfort, 6th Earl of Leicester; the Cinquefoil of the de Beaumont Earls of Leicester; and the running fox from the county's crest, used on many of the county organisations' emblems.
	24 October 2005	Flag of Lincolnshire^{reg}	A red cross with yellow trimming on a blue and green field, and a yellow fleur de lys in the middle of the cross.
	1909	Flag of Middlesex^{reg}	A red field with three white, gold-hilted Saxon swords or seax under a gold Saxon crown.
	11 September 2014	Flag of Norfolk^{reg}	Ermine bend from top left to bottom right on a gold and black field. The design is a banner of the arms attributed to Ralph (Ranulph) de Gael (de Guader), first Earl of Norfolk (1071-1075).
	11 September 2014	Flag of Northamptonshire^{reg}	A gold cross with a black border on a maroon field with a rose in the centre. The link with the rose dates back to at least the 17th century, while the gold cross is edged in black, recalling the county’s leather boot and shoe industry.
	7th century (modern form 1951)	Flag of Northumberland^{reg} ^{coa}	Historical flag readopted in 1951 and used officially by the county council, and later released by the council and registered as the flag of the historic county. Eight yellow rectangles on a red field; note that the canton (top corner nearest the flagpole) should be gold.
	20 May 2011	Flag of Nottinghamshire^{reg}	The inescutcheon represents Robin Hood, a silhouette of James Woodford’s bronze statue of Robin Hood, which stands close to Nottingham Castle.
	2017 on	Flag of Oxfordshire	The arms of the pre-1974 County Council: blue with a red ox head on a double bend wavy, between a wheatsheaf and an oak. (Registered by the Flag Institute)
	17 November 2015	Flag of Rutland^{reg} ^{coa}	A green field semée of acorns with a golden horseshoe in the centre, the traditional emblem of Rutland since at least 1784.
	March 2012	Flag of Shropshire^{reg}	The leopards' faces, fondly referred to as "loggerheads" locally, are a traditional emblem for Shropshire and have historically evolved from the loggerheads on the Shrewsbury town arms. The erminois aspect differentiates the county flag from that of its county town.
	4 July 2013	Flag of Somerset^{reg}	A red dragon rampant on a gold field, from a longstanding local badge; the winning entry in a competition.
	28 March 2016	Flag of Staffordshire^{reg}	A red chevron on a gold field, with a gold Stafford knot, the county's longstanding symbol. All elements are taken from the de Stafford coat of arms. Designed by the Staffordshire Heritage Group and chosen by the Flag Institute over the county council's own flag after a public vote.
	9 October 2017	Flag of Suffolk^{reg}	Derived from the arms attributed to Saint Edmund the Martyr.
	11 September 2014	Flag of Surrey^{reg}	Chequey Or and azure; a traditional design derived from a personal coat of arms first recorded in the 11th century.
	20 May 2011	Flag of Sussex^{reg}	Six gold martlets on blue are the traditional emblem of Sussex. This flag is for public use by the entire shire county of Sussex and its people.
	15 August 2016	Flag of Warwickshire^{reg}	The traditional bear and ragged staff badge, shown white on red; the badge is from that of the Earls of Warwick.
	30 September 2011	Flag of Westmorland^{reg}	A golden heraldic apple tree on white and red bars. The two red bars on a white background are taken from the arms of the de Lancaster family who were Barons of Kendal. On this was placed a heraldically stylised gold apple tree from the thirteenth century seal of the borough of Appleby, the county town.
	5 June 2007	Flag of Wiltshire^{reg}	Alternating stripes of green and white represent the grassy downs of the county and their chalk underlay. The colours can represent hope, joy and safety (green) and peace (white). In the centre, the male great bustard is depicted in gold on a solid green circle to represent the open grassland. The circle is bordered in six sections alternating green and white, representing the stone circles of Stonehenge and Avebury in the county.
	8 April 2013	Flag of Worcestershire^{reg}	Black pears appear in the arms of the City of Worcester, and as such have long been considered a county badge, reportedly dating back to the Battle of Agincourt. The county flag was established by a competition in 2013.
	1965 or earlier	Flag of Yorkshire^{reg}	The White Rose of York (the traditional county emblem) on a blue field.

== Ceremonial counties ==
The counties and areas for the purposes of the lieutenancies, also referred to as the lieutenancy areas of England and informally known as ceremonial counties, are 48 areas of England to which lords-lieutenant are appointed. Legally, the areas in England, as well as in Wales and Scotland, are defined by the Lieutenancies Act 1997 as "counties and areas for the purposes of the lieutenancies in Great Britain", in contrast to the areas used for local government. They are also informally known as "geographic counties", to distinguish them from other types of counties of England.

Flag	Date	Use	Description
	Traditional; 12 April 1951	Flag of Bedfordshire^{reg} ^{coa}	The red and yellow colours come from the Beauchamps family coat of arms. The vertical black stripe with three shells, or escallops, comes from the arms of the Dukes of Bedford. The wavy lines represent the River Great Ouse. A slightly updated version was registered with the Flag Institute on 14 September 2014 after Bedfordshire County Council was disbanded and replaced by two unitary authorities.
	Traditional; 2 March 2017	Flag of Berkshire^{reg}	Traditional badge: a stag beneath Herne the Hunter's oak.
	Date registered	Flag of Bristol	No registered official ceremonial county flag.
	Traditional; 20 May 2011	Flag of Buckinghamshire^{reg}	A field party per pale of black and red with a white swan.
	1 February 2015	Flag of Cambridgeshire^{reg}	The three gold crowns represent East Anglia, with wavy light blue lines representing the river Cam in the colours of Cambridge University on a dark blue background.
	3 May 1938	Flag of Cheshire	Three golden sheaves of wheat and a golden blade on a blue background. The design has been associated with the Earldom of Chester since the 12th century, and has been used in the coat of arms of Chester since at least 1560.
	1381	Flag of the City of London (Ceremonial county and city flag)	A red cross on a white field, with a red sword in the canton. The City of London (excluding Greater London) is England's smallest ceremonial county and measures approximately 1 square mile (2.6 km2). The City of London is officially not part of Greater London or its 32 boroughs.
	Traditional	Flag of Cornwall – St Pirran's Cross	A white cross on a black field.
	5 September 2025	Flag of Cumbria	Gold and Green zig-zags at the bottom representing the mountainous landscape with a dark blue background and a crown representing the ancient kingdom of Rheged and the highest peak in England.
	22 September 2006	Flag of Derbyshire^{reg}	A green cross with a white border on a sky blue field, with a gold Tudor rose in the centre, 3:5.
	23 July 2006	Flag of Devon, alias St Petroc's Cross^{reg}	A white cross with a black border on a green field, 3:5.
	16 September 2008	Flag of Dorset – The Dorset Cross, aka St Wite's Cross^{reg}	A white cross with a red border on a gold field, 3:5.
	21 November 2013	Flag of Durham	A gold and blue horizontal bicolour with St Cuthbert's Cross countercharged upon it, 3:5.
	18 April 2013	Flag of East Riding of Yorkshire (Ceremonial county)	A Yorkshire white rose, displayed in the East Riding style with one sepal at the top, set against a bi-colour of blue at the hoist, representing the sea and the historic maritime activities of the East Riding and green in the fly symbolising the locality's rich agricultural land. Additionally, the blue hoist colour signifies the East Riding's connection to the whole of Yorkshire whilst the green is placed towards the fly to represent its position in the east of the county.
	Date registered	Flag of East Sussex	No registered official ceremonial county flag, although it shares a historic county flag with West Sussex.
	Ancient	Flag of Essex^{reg}	A red field with three white, gold hilted seax (Saxon swords).
	March 2008	Flag of Gloucestershire – The Severn Cross^{reg}	A mid-blue cross, outlined in cream, against an apple green background – the winning entry in a competition to commemorate the county's millennium.
	Date registered	Flag of Greater London	No registered official ceremonial county flag.
	Date registered	Flag of Greater Manchester	Unofficial ceremonial county flag.
	12 March 2019	Flag of Hampshire^{reg}	A gold Saxon crown above a Tudor rose over a field of red and gold representing the former Saxon kingdom of Wessex.
	2 November 2019	Flag of Herefordshire^{reg}	On a dark red background, a white bull's head above three wavy lines, ordered white-blue-white.
	19 November 2008	Flag of Hertfordshire^{reg} ^{coa}	Against eight blue and white wavy lines, representing the county's rivers, a gold shield bearing a resting deer or hart.
	January 2009	Flag of the Isle of Wight (Ceremonial county and Island) ^{reg}	A white lozenge with an upper indent or "pile" on a light blue background, over six wavy stripes of blue and white. The Isle of Wight became administered by its own county council in 1890, but was formally part of Hampshire up until the local government reforms of 1974 when it became a full ceremonial county with its own Lord Lieutenant.
	1605	Flag of Kent^{reg}	A red field with a white horse in the centre, 3:5.
	Modern form since 20 November 2008	Flag of Lancashire^{reg}	The Red Rose of Lancashire on a yellow field (originally a white field).
	16 July 2021	Flag of Leicestershire^{reg}	A red and white dancetté background, taken from the arms of Simon de Montfort, 6th Earl of Leicester; the Cinquefoil of the de Beaumont Earls of Leicester; and the running fox from the county's crest, used on many of the county organisations' emblems.
	24 October 2005	Flag of Lincolnshire^{reg}	A red cross with yellow trimming on a blue and green field, and a yellow fleur de lys in the middle of the cross.
	Date registered	Flag of Merseyside	No registered official ceremonial county flag.
	11 September 2014	Flag of Norfolk^{reg}	Ermine bend from top left to bottom right on a gold and black field.
	Date registered	Flag of North Yorkshire	No registered official ceremonial county flag.
	11 September 2014	Flag of Northamptonshire^{reg}	A gold cross with a black border on a maroon field with a rose in the centre.
	7th century (modern form 1951)	Flag of Northumberland^{reg} ^{coa}	Historical flag readopted in 1951 and used officially by the county council, and later released by the council and registered as the flag of the historic county. Eight yellow rectangles on a red field; note that the canton (top corner nearest the flagpole) should be gold.
	20 May 2011	Flag of Nottinghamshire^{reg}	The inescutcheon represents Robin Hood.
	2017 on	Flag of Oxfordshire	The arms of the pre-1974 County Council: blue with a red ox head on a double bend wavy, between a wheatsheaf and an oak. (Registered by the Flag Institute)
	17 November 2015	Flag of Rutland^{reg} ^{coa}	A green field semée of acorns with a golden horseshoe in the centre
	March 2012	Flag of Shropshire^{reg}	The leopards' faces, fondly referred to as "loggerheads" locally, are a traditional emblem for Shropshire and have historically evolved from the loggerheads on the Shrewsbury town arms. The erminois aspect differentiates the county flag from that of its county town.
	4 July 2013	Flag of Somerset^{reg}	A red dragon rampant on a gold field, from a longstanding local badge; the winning entry in a competition.
	Date registered	Flag of South Yorkshire	No registered official ceremonial county flag.
	28 March 2016	Flag of Staffordshire^{reg}	A red chevron on a gold field, with a gold Stafford knot, the county's longstanding symbol. All elements are taken from the de Stafford coat of arms. Designed by the Staffordshire Heritage Group and chosen by the Flag Institute over the county council's own flag after a public vote.
	9 October 2017	Flag of Suffolk^{reg}	Derived from the arms attributed to Saint Edmund the Martyr.
	11 September 2014	Flag of Surrey^{reg}	Chequey Or and azure; a traditional design derived from a personal coat of arms first recorded in the 11th century.
	Date registered	Flag of Tyne and Wear	No registered official ceremonial county flag.
	15 August 2016	Flag of Warwickshire^{reg}	The traditional bear and ragged staff badge, shown white on red; the badge is from that of the Earls of Warwick.
	Date registered	Flag of West Midlands	No registered official ceremonial county flag.
	Date registered	Flag of West Sussex	No registered official ceremonial county flag, although it shares a historic county flag with East Sussex.
	Date registered	Flag of West Yorkshire	No registered official ceremonial county flag.
	5 June 2007	Flag of Wiltshire^{reg}	Alternating stripes of green and white represent the grassy downs of the county and their chalk underlay. The colours can represent hope, joy and safety (green) and peace (white). In the centre, the male great bustard is depicted in gold on a solid green circle to represent the open grassland. The circle is bordered in six sections alternating green and white, representing the stone circles of Stonehenge and Avebury in the county. The six portions also represent the six surrounding counties of Gloucestershire, Oxfordshire, Berkshire, Hampshire, Dorset and Somerset.
	8 April 2013	Flag of Worcestershire^{reg}	Black pears appear in the arms of the City of Worcester, and as such have long been considered a county badge, reportedly dating back to the Battle of Agincourt. The county flag was established by a competition in 2013.

== Islands ==
Flag	Date	Use	Description
	14 April 2010	Flag of the Isle of Portland^{reg}	The colours represent the landscape of the area: Portland stone, grass and the sea. The white tower represents the castles and the naval coronet shows the long connection with the Royal Navy.
	2019	Flag of the Isle of Purbeck^{reg} An island in name only; not geographically an island.	Symbols include a curving wave, an ammonite and fish. The island's flag day is 26 November.
	January 2009	Flag of the Isle of Wight ^{reg}	A white lozenge with an upper indent or "pile" on a light blue background, over six wavy stripes of blue and white. The Isle of Wight became administered by its own county council in 1890, but was formally part of Hampshire up until the local government reforms of 1974 when it became a full ceremonial county with its own Lord Lieutenant.
	1954–1969, 2010–present	Flag of Lundy	A blue flag with a white letter "L" on the hoist side.

== Local government areas ==
Heraldic bearings are granted to individuals and corporations by the Lord Lyon in Scotland or by the College of Arms in England, Northern Ireland and Wales on behalf of the sovereign as the fount of all honours. Local authority flags come within this category when based on the arms granted to that authority, and such a flag is the authority's personal property, representing that authority rather than its area.

Flag	Date	Use	Description
		Former Bedfordshire Council banner	Red and gold quarters split horizontally by blue and white waves and vertically with a black band containing three white shells. The red and gold quarters are from the arms of the Beauchamps, the leading family in the county after the Norman Conquest. The waves signify the River Great Ouse, and the shells are from the arms of the Russell Family, commemorating their services to the state and to the county.
		Berkshire's banner of arms	Two lions passant (referencing Berkshire's Royal and Norman connections) and a Saxon Crown (referencing Berkshire's formative Saxon history) on a white background.
		Flag of Cambridgeshire Council	Local authority flag. Gold with a red bordure based on the Scottish tressure. The blue wavy pallets represent the many rivers of the county, while the straight pallets are for the drains and dykes that run through the Fenlands.
		Flag of the former Cheshire Council	Local authority flag. A trio of golden wheatsheaves on blue which have been associated with the Earldom of Chester since the late 12th century.
		Flag of the former Cleveland County Council	Local authority flag.
		Flag of Cumbria Council	On the green border are Parnassus flowers (representing Cumberland) interspersed with white roses (Yorkshire) superimposed with red roses (Lancashire). The centre of the shield is made up of segments of blue, white, yellow and green divided by wavy vertical lines and zig-zag horizontal lines. This depicts the new County and from left to right the vertical lines of segments show: blue and white for the sea, blue and yellow (gold) for the lakes and agriculture, green and white for mountains and lakes and green and yellow (gold) for mountains and agriculture.
		Flag of Dorset Council	Three red lions passant (referencing Dorset's Royal and Norman connections) and a fleur-de-lys on a white background. Banner of the Dorset Council Arms.
		Flag of Durham County Council	Local authority flag. A yellow cross on a blue field with lions rampant in each quarter, the centre of the cross is broken with a white rose of York (to represent the area of Yorkshire in Teesdale administered by the council) and black diamonds on each arm. Flag modified from the arms of the Bishopric of Durham
		Flag of East Riding of Yorkshire Council	Local authority flag based on the coat of arms.
	1975	Flag of East Sussex Council	The banner of arms was granted to East Sussex County Council by the College of Arms in 1975.
	1965-1986	Former Flag of Greater London Council	The former flag of the Greater London Council (1965-1986), a local government body which merged Middlesex with parts of Surrey, Kent, Essex and Hertfordshire to form Greater London. The GLC replaced the earlier London County Council (1889-1965).
	2025-present	Flag of Greater London Authority	Banner of the arms of the former Greater London Council, granted to the Greater London Authority in 2025.
		Former Greater Manchester Council flag	Local authority flag. "Gules, ten Towers three two three two, all within a Bordure embattled Or".
		Flag of Hampshire Council	Hampshire County Council local authority flag. This is a corporate flag, not the ceremonial county flag of Hampshire.
		Flag of Herefordshire Council	Local authority flag. The red field represents the county's red earth. Across this runs a white and blue wave for the River Wye. In chief is a gold lion from the arms of the City of Hereford, and in base is a Herefordshire Bull's head.
	November 2008	Flag of Hertfordshire^{coa}	Against eight blue and white wavy lines, representing the county's rivers, a gold shield bearing a resting deer or hart. (Also used as a county flag.)
	1938	Flag of Isle of Wight Council	County council flag. Features a representation of Carisbrooke Castle against a surrounding blue field and three gold anchors represent the island's status and maritime history.
		Flag of Lancashire County Council	A banner of the council's coat of arms.
		Flag of Leicestershire Council	The flag is divided into four quarters. The first quarter is a cinquefol, or five within a red circle, the second quarter is charged a white lion with two tails on a red ground, the third quarter shows an ermine plume on a red ground and the fourth shows a black maunch.
	1 April 1974 to 31 March 1986	Former Merseyside Council flag	The waves represent the River Mersey; the six golden mural crowns represent the six County Boroughs—Birkenhead, Bootle, Liverpool, Southport, St Helens, and Wallasey—that Merseyside was created from..
		Flag of Norfolk Council	The top part of the flag shows a lion from the Royal arms of England together with ostrich plumes and coronet referring to the Prince of Wales. This is a very special honour for the County Council, the King, in the Royal Licence, specifically instructs on the design of the arms to be granted "in commemoration of our long residence in Norfolk". This of course refers to Sandringham. The lower part of the flag comprises the arms attributed to Ralph de Gael or Guader, first Earl of Norfolk circa 1069. The ermine may well refer to Brittany as Ralph was Lord of Gael in that Duchy.
	7th century (modern form 1951)	Flag of Northumberland	Historical flag readopted in 1951 and used officially by the county council, and later released by the council and registered as the flag of the historic county. Eight yellow rectangles on a red field, note that the canton (top corner nearest the flagpole) should be gold.
		Flag of Nottinghamshire Council	Local authority flag. The wave is for River Trent and the oak tree for Sherwood Forest.
		Flag of Rutland Council	Local authority flag. A green background strewn with golden acorns, surrounding a central golden horseshoe.
		Flag of Somerset Council	Local authority flag. A red dragon on a yellow field, bearing a blue mace – a banner of the county arms.
		Former South Yorkshire Council	Flag based on the council's arms.
		Flag of Staffordshire Council	Local authority flag. All the devices on the flag come from arms of various Earls of Stafford. The red chevron on gold was the arms of the de Staffords. It is charged with the family's famous Stafford knot badge. The lion represents the authority of the council.
		Flag of Suffolk Council	Local authority flag. Coat of arms of Suffolk on a gold background. The main charge in the arms is the sun rising over the sea. Suffolk is the most easterly county in England and thus the first to see the sun rise. The open crowns and crossed arrows refer to Bury St Edmunds and have been widely used in the arms of Suffolk towns and districts.
		Flag of Surrey Council	Local authority flag. Divided into halves, blue and black, with two gold keys representing the Chertsey Abbey, a woolpack on blue and a sprig of oak on black. (a banner of the modern coat of arms of Surrey County Council).
		Former West Midlands Council flag	Local authority flag. The flag has two dancetty barrulets interlaced to form a W and M representing the initials of "West Midlands".
	1889-1974	Former West Sussex Council flag	Blue and gold flag with six golden martlets. Old 1889-1974 West Sussex County Council flag.
	2008–Present	West Sussex Council flag	A blue banner with 7 light blue wavy lines with the crowned coat of arms in the centre in white.
		Flag of Wiltshire Council	A banner of the council's coat of arms.

== Police constabulary flags ==
Flag	Date	Use	Description
	1829	Flag of the Greater London Metropolitan Police	The Badge of the Metropolitan Police on a blue background, with white squares at the edge

== Cities ==
This is a list of officially recognised flags for various cities in England. Where listed as 'official', they have been registered by the Flag Institute charity or another official source. This list may be incomplete, please add official flags with sources showing the official flag design.

Flag	Date	Use	Ceremonial County	Description
Official community design	2015	Flag of Birmingham (City and Metropolitan borough)	West Midlands	Golden vertical zig-zag offset to hoist dividing blue and red, with a bulls head in the centre. Updated in 2015 from the 1977 banner of arms.
Official design	2018	Flag of Coventry (City and metropolitan borough).	West Midlands	Silhouette of Lady Godiva on a white field with two stripes in the traditional shade of Coventry Blue. Updated in 2018 from the 1345 arms flag depicting an Elephant.
	1615 (Arms)	Flag of Durham (City and civil parish)	County Durham	A red cross outlined in white on a black field.
	1620 (Arms)	Flag of Plymouth (City and unitary authority)	Devon	Arms of Plymouth City Council set on a red field.
	1194, 1622, 1686 (Arms)	Flag (or Banner of arms) of Portsmouth (City and unitary authority)	Hampshire	A crescent of gold on a shade of azure, with a blazing star of eight points. Portsmouth's original 1194 arms are based on those used by King Richard I and William de Longchamp, who granted Portsmouth its town charter in 1194. Portsmouth's arms predate the College of Arms, but were confirmed by Heraldic visitations in 1622 (by John Philipot) and in 1686 (by Henry St George, the younger). The Portsmouth arms are officially owned by Portsmouth City Council.
	2012	Flag of Preston (City and non-metropolitan district)	Lancashire	A Paschal Lamb couchant Argent supporting a Cross-Staff Or taken from the coat of arms of c.1613 on a white cross, enlaid with a blue cross, on a blue field.
Recognised design	2017	Flag of Southampton (City and unitary authority)	Hampshire	An anchor and Tudor Rose on a red and white field. Updated in 2017 from the arms flag of 1575.

== Towns ==
Flag	Date	Use	Description
	2014	Flag of Appleby-in-Westmorland^{reg} (Town and civil parish, Cumbria)	A gold apple tree on a blue field.
	2020	Flag of Bexhill-on-Sea^{reg} (Town and civil parish, East Sussex)	A red saltire on a counter-changed field of green and white.
	2017	Flag of Bloxwich^{reg} (Town and civil parish, West Midlands)	A counter-changed black and green cross on a white field with a rampant black lion in the canton and a green tree in the hoist.
	2009	Flag of Calne^{reg} (Town and civil parish, Wiltshire)	
	2016	Flag of Caterham^{reg} (Town, Surrey)	
	2016	Flag of Heathfield^{reg} (Town, East Sussex)	A flag divided from top-left to bottom-right by a white line, with a white cuckoo on black in the hoist, and a white tower (defaced with a green key) on green in the fly.
	2011	Flag of Kingswinford^{reg} (Town, West Midlands)	
	2013	Flag of Newbury^{reg} (Town, Berkshire)	
	2009	Flag of Newton Abbot (Town and civil parish, Devon)	A stylised image of St Leonard's Tower in the centre of a modified flag of Devon. The green represents the moors, the black the granite and the white the clay of the surrounding area. The cross is also used to represent a major crossroads in the town which converged on the clock tower. The arms of the cross represent the routes to Exeter and London, Bovey Tracey and the moors, Totnes and Plymouth, and Torquay and Brixham.
	2012	Flag of Penrith^{reg} (Town and civil parish, Cumbria)	A red saltire on white with blue knot/flowers in each quarter.
	2008	Flag of Petersfield^{reg} (Town and civil parish, Hampshire)	
	2020	Flag of Poole^{reg} (Town, Dorset)	
	2012	Flag of St Annes-on-the-Sea^{reg} (Town, Lancashire)	
	2017	Flag of Thame (Town and civil parish, Oxfordshire)	The flag results from a competition held in the town. It incorporates Thame Town Council’s colours with part of the town’s emblem on the left hand side, and three waves – which signify the countryside, the Phoenix Trail and the River Thame – on the right hand side.
	2019	Flag of Wadhurst^{reg} (Town and civil parish, East Sussex)	A golden-orange "W" shape on a green field, with three white six-pointed estoiles between the arms of the "W".
	2014	Flag of Willenhall^{reg} (Town and civil parish, West Midlands)	

== Villages ==
Flag	Date	Use	Description
	2016	Flag of Cromford^{reg} (Village and civil parish, Derbyshire)	
	2014	Flag of Evenley^{reg} (Village and civil parish, Northamptonshire)	
	2012	Flag of Flore^{reg} (Village and civil parish, Northamptonshire)	
	2016	Flag of Four Elms^{reg} (Village, Kent)	
	2014	Flag of Hampton Poyle^{reg} (Village, Oxfordshire)	
	2014	Flag of Horningsea^{reg} (Village, Cambridgeshire)	
	2019	Flag of Marden^{reg} (Village and civil parish, Herefordshire)	
	2014	Flag of Nenthead^{reg} (Village, Cumbria)	
	2014	Flag of Pewsey^{reg} (Village and civil parish, Wiltshire)	
	2013	Flag of Staining^{reg} (Village and civil parish, Lancashire)	
	2013	Flag of Wing^{reg} (Village and civil parish, Buckinghamshire)	
	2015	Flag of Wreay^{reg} (Village, Cumbria)	
	2009	Flag of Wroxton^{reg} (Village and civil parish, Oxfordshire)	

== University flags ==
Flag	Date	Use	Description
		Flag of the University of Bristol	
		Flag of the University of Cambridge	
		Flag of the University of East Anglia	
		Flag of the University of Hull	The Cross of Saint George defaced in the centre with the university's coat of arms.
		Flag of the University of Leicester	
		Flag of the University of London	
		Flag of the University of Oxford	An open book with the inscription Dominus Illuminatio Mea (Latin for "The Lord is my light"), surrounded by three golden crowns (two above and one below) on a blue field.
		Flag of the University of Roehampton	
		Flag of the University of Warwick	

== Other flags ==
Flag	Date	Use	Description
	1998	Flag of the Campaign for an English Parliament	
	1984	Flag of English Heritage	

== Historical flags ==
=== Royal standards ===
Flag	Date	Use	Description
	1042–1066	Royal Banner of King Edward the Confessor	A golden cross with fleur-de-lis ends over a blue field, surrounded by five golden martlets. This former Royal Banner was used by St Edward the Confessor, one of the last Anglo-Saxon English kings.
	1066	Banner of King Harold II	The reconstruction of the "Fighting Man Banner" mentioned by William of Poitiers. Was the military standard or personal banner of Harold Godwinson who led the Anglo-Saxon army in the Battle of Hastings (1066) against the Norman invaders.
	1198–1340	Royal Banner of King Richard I	Gules three lions passant guardant in pale Or armed and langued Azure, meaning three gold lions with blue tongues and claws, walking and facing the observer, arranged in a column on a red background. It forms the first and fourth quarters of the Royal Standard of the United Kingdom.
	1340–1395; 1399–1406	Royal Banner of King Edward III	The Coat of Arms of England quartered with the Royal Standard of France, the fleurs-de-lis representing Edward III's claim to the French throne.
	1395–1399	Royal Banner of King Richard II	The Coat of Arms of England impaled with attributed arms of King Edward The Confessor (symbolising mystical union).
	1406–1422; 1461–1470; 1471–1554; 1558–1603	Royal Banner of King Henry IV	The French quartering has been altered to three fleurs-de-lis.
	1422–1461; 1470–1471	Royal Banner of King Henry VI	The Coat of Arms of France impaled with the Coat of Arms of England, symbolising the dual monarchy of England and France.
	1554–1558	Royal Banner of Queen Mary I and King Philip	The Coat of Arms of Habsburg Spain impaled with the Coat of Arms of England.
	1603–1689, 1702–1707	Royal Standard of the House of Stuart, used first by James VI and I	A banner of the Royal Coat of Arms of James I, first and fourth quarters representing England and the English claim to the French throne, second quarter representing Scotland, third quarter representing Ireland. This was the last royal banner of the Kingdom of England.
	1689–1694	Royal Standard of King William III and II and Queen Mary II	A banner of the joint Royal Coat of Arms of William III and Mary II, consisting of the Coat of Arms of England defaced with an inescutcheon for the House of Nassau (representing William) and impaled with another undefaced version of the same Coat of Arms (representing Mary).
	1694–1702	Royal Standard of King William III and II	A banner of the Royal Coat of Arms of William III, first and fourth quarters representing England and the English claim to the French throne, second quarter representing Scotland, third quarter representing Ireland, with an inescutcheon for the House of Nassau.

=== National flags and ensigns ===
Flag	Date	Use	Description
	Anglo-Saxon era	Reputedly to symbolise Anglo-Saxon England	In Historia Brittonum, two dragons appear. The red dragon symbolised the Welsh while a white dragon symbolised the Anglo-Saxons. A dragon also later appears twice in the death scene of King Harold II on the Bayeux Tapestry depicting the Battle of Hastings in 1066. The Modern White Dragon Flag of England is based on a legend in Geoffrey of Monmouth's "History of the Kings of Britain".
	1620–1707	English Red Ensign	Ensign of the red squadron with the Flag of England in the canton
	1620–1702	English White Ensign	Ensign of the white squadron with the Flag of England in the canton
	1702–1707	English White Ensign	Ensign of the white squadron with the Flag of England in the canton with large cross of St George placed upon a white background
	1620–1707	English Blue Ensign	Ensign of the blue squadron with the Flag of England in the canton
	1606–1801	First Union Jack/Flag of the United Kingdom of Great Britain	The first Union Flag (also known as the King's Colours) with the Cross of St George placed upon the Flag of Scotland

=== County flags ===
Flag	Date	Use	Description
	pre–2008	Unofficial flag of Lancashire	The Red Rose of Lancashire on a white field. It was denied registration by the Flag Institute, due to being almost identical to the already registered flag of the town of Montrose, Angus.

== See also ==
- List of British flags
- List of Northern Irish flags
- List of Scottish flags
- List of Welsh flags
- List of Cornish flags
- Raven banner
