= Flag of Wiltshire =

Flags of English county

Wiltshire
- Bustard Flag
- Proportion: 3:5
- Adopted: 1 December 2009
- Designed by: Mike Prior

There are three flag designs associated with the English county of Wiltshire. Like the proposed flags of many other counties, two of the three have no official status as they were not designed by the College of Arms. One of the designs, the "Bustard Flag", was approved by a full meeting of the Wiltshire Council on 1 December 2009, as a county flag and subsequently registered with the Flag Institute for the entire county. Its adoption followed the reintroduction of the great bustard to Wiltshire. The flag has received criticism from vexillologists and heraldists for its cluttered design and lack of clarity from a distance.

== The Bustard Flag ==
=== Design and Symbolism ===
The Coat of Arms of Wiltshire County Council

The flag features eight wavy stripes, which also alternate between green and white, symbolising Wiltshire’s pasture-lands and chalk downs. These stripes were derived from the horizontal stripes on the escutcheon of the now obsolete Coat of Arms of Wiltshire County Council, as the council was abolished on 1 April 2009 and replaced with the unitary authority, Wiltshire Council. The coat of arms was officially granted on 5 April 1937. A silhouette of a male great bustard (Otis tarda), representing the bird reintroduced to Wiltshire, is centred on a green central disk, representing Wiltshire's open grassland. The silhouette is larger than the disk, overlapping with the disk's rim and the flag’s stripes. Although registered as gold, the actual colour of the great bustard silhouette is alpine. The rim of the disk is divided into six alternating green and white sections, representing both the county’s historic stone circles, such as Stonehenge and Avebury, and the six surrounding ceremonial counties: Berkshire, Dorset, Gloucestershire, Hampshire, Oxfordshire, and Somerset. The disk’s rim sections are enclosed by a thin outer green line and a thin inner white line. The flag's dimensions follow a 3:5 proportion.

The great bustard had been extinct in England since 1832, but the Wiltshire-based charity, the Great Bustard Group (GBG), imported chicks from Russia between 2004 and 2012, and then eggs from Spain between 2014 and 2019, releasing the birds onto Salisbury Plain. In the summer of 2026, there were around 50 great bustards in south Wiltshire.

=== History ===
In 2006, the Bustard Flag was created by Mike Prior and digitally designed by his daughter, Helen Pocock, while they were working at their family print business. Mike Prior attempted to popularise the Bustard Flag by contacting notable figures of Wiltshire, including Alexander Thynn, 7th Marquess of Bath. The marquess raised the flag in Mike Prior’s garden on 24 September 2006. Mike Prior also contacted the local authorities. This resulted in Jane Scott, Baroness Scott of Bybrook, then leader of the now-abolished Wiltshire County Council, raising the flag at County Hall, Trowbridge, on 5 June 2007.

Without consulting the populace, Wiltshire Council formally adopted the Bustard Flag at a full meeting on 1 December 2009. The flag was subsequently registered with the Flag Institute. The flag only represents the area of the unitary authority of Wiltshire, rather than the ceremonial county of Wiltshire; therefore, it does not represent the Borough of Swindon, which became a unitary authority on 1 April 1997.

Mike Prior admitted that ‘there is no method or authority to get it accepted as the county flag of Wiltshire, that is all done by public acceptance’. Accordingly, Mike Prior continued to campaign for public acceptance of the Bustard Flag after Wiltshire Council’s formal adoption of the flag. During the 2011 Glastonbury Festival, Mike Prior offered to refund half the cost of an individual's £200 ticket if the attendee managed to get the flag on TV coverage of the event. The flag appeared on TV coverage of the Pyramid Stage during multiple sets.

=== Criticism ===
The Bustard Flag has faced criticism from vexillologists and heraldists for its irregular design and intricate details. The silhouette is too large to be contained by the disk, and along with the thin inner and outer border lines on the disk’s rim, is not discernible from a distance. The stripes' wavy nature becomes indistinguishable from horizontal stripes when the flag is flying.

== The Wiltshire Flag War ==
Proposed White Horse Flag

The raising of the Bustard Flag at County Hall, Trowbridge, on 5 June 2007, by the then leader of Wiltshire Council, Jane Scott, Baroness Scott of Bybrook, was a symbolic endorsement of the Bustard Flag. This led to heightened criticism of the flag and renewed attention was received for the proposed ‘White Horse Flag’ designed by Chrys Fear, who was a student from Wiltshire, who asserted that the white horse symbol, as found in the context of hillside chalk carvings across the county – most famously the Westbury White Horse and the Cherhill White Horse – was an image of greater cultural connection to Wiltshire. Fear's design incorporated the sketch of the Cherhill White Horse found in William Plenderleath's The White Horses of the West of England, published in 1885, set against a green field.

Fear's design was never formally submitted to Wiltshire County Council or its successor, Wiltshire Council, for review or approval. He campaigned for the flag's popular adoption by local people and emphasised its free, public, and uncopyrighted status. However, the campaign dissipated after Wiltshire Council, without consultation with the Moonrakers, formally adopted the Bustard Flag on 1 December 2009 as the flag for the area under its governance and subsequently registered it with the Flag Institute.

== The Banner of Arms of the Wiltshire County Council ==
The Banner of Arms of the Wiltshire County Council

The Banner of Arms of the Wiltshire County Council represented the council, which was abolished on 1 April 2009, thereby rendering the banner of arms obsolete. Wiltshire County Council was the only entity legally permitted to use it. A banner of arms is derived from the escutcheon of a coat of arms; however, on the Banner of Arms of Wiltshire County Council, the dragon badge of Wessex is cast on a green field rather than the white field of the canton in the escutcheon of the Coat of Arms of Wiltshire County Council. Therefore, the banner of arms is heraldically inaccurate.

== See also ==
- List of English flags
- Flag of Berkshire
- Flag of Dorset
- Flag of Gloucestershire
- Flag of Hampshire
- Flag of Oxfordshire
- Flag of Somerset
