= Flag of Worcestershire =

Flag of English county

Worcestershire
- Proportion: 16:9
- Adopted: 8 April 2013
- Designed by: Elaine Truby

The Worcestershire flag is the flag of the county of Worcestershire. It was registered with the Flag Institute on 8 April 2013 as the winning entry of a BBC Hereford & Worcester competition. It was first flown in a ceremony at Worcester Cathedral on the same day.

Its design features three black pears, a common symbol of the county, arranged as they are on the coat of arms of Worcester. The shield that bears these is on top of wavy green and blue lines.

== Design ==
Designed by Elaine Truby, the flag features the county's famed black pear (black worcester pear) – a symbol reported to have been used by Worcestershire units at the Battle of Agincourt. Additionally a pear tree is seen on the local council's arms. Three of these pears are seen on a shield charged against a wavy green and blue background. These latter colours symbolise the verdant flood plain of the River Severn as it runs through the county. The dark green hue is that worn by the county's cricket team.

=== Colours ===
Scheme	Blue	White	Green	Black
Refs				
Pantone (paper)	2985 C	Safe	355 C	Black
HEX	#5bc2e7	#FFFFFF	#009639	#000000
CMYK	61, 16, 0, 9	0, 0, 0, 0	100, 0, 62, 41	0, 0, 0, 100
RGB	90, 195, 232	255, 255, 255	0, 150, 57	0, 0, 0

== History ==
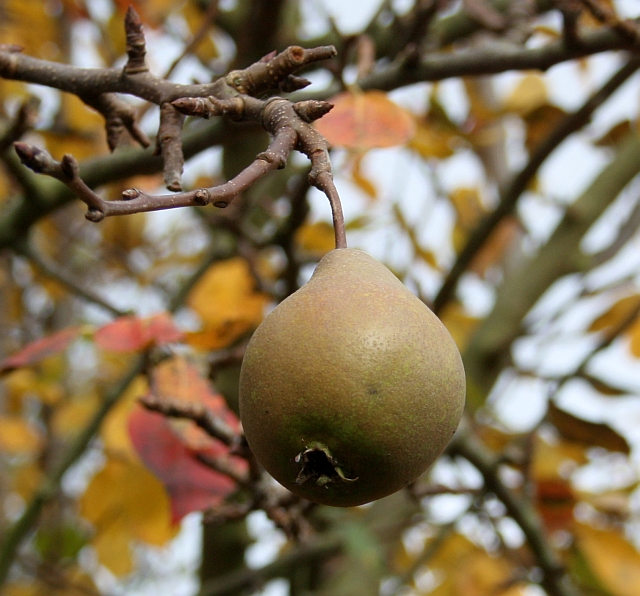
A Worcester black pear, used as a symbol for Worcestershire.

=== Black pear ===
A Black Worcester pear or pear tree has long been used as a symbol for Worcestershire. Pears formed part of the provisions of the troops at Agincourt in 1415, where Worcestershire bowmen carried banners depicting a pear tree laden with fruit. Michael Drayton's poem of the battle, notes “Wor’ster a pear tree laden with its fruit”. On Queen Elizabeth I's visit to the city of Worcester in August 1575, the city authorities ordered a black pear fruit-laden tree to be transplanted to the Foregate from Whystone Farm, in her honour. So admiring was she of the good management that had allowed the fruit to remain unplucked that she granted an augmentation of honour of a canton charged with "three pears sable" to be added to the city's coat of arms, and they remain on the arms of Worcester today. Though the arms appear similar to the modern flag, the pears are separated horizontally by a fess. The fessless design, however, was used on local currency used in the day.

Up until amalgamation with the Warwickshire Yeomanry in 1956, the Worcestershire Yeomanry used an image of the pear blossom for badges. It is still used on the County Council and County Cricket Club badge.

Specific varieties of pear are seldom mentioned in heraldic blazons, although "Warden pears" are blazoned as canting arms for the family of Warden. Pears feature in the canting arms of the families of Parincheff and Periton.

=== 2013 competition ===
The flag was created after a competition was launched in 2013 by radio station BBC Hereford & Worcester, to create an official flag for the county after it was discovered Worcestershire didn't have one.

The finalists were the following flags:

Design 1

Design 2

Design 3 (winner)

Design 4

Though each finalist flag made use of the black pear design, only the winner made use of the arrangement used on the Worcester coat of arms. Local MP Mark Garnier said of the winner:

The flag looks brilliant and I think it represents Worcestershire perfectly. I congratulate Mrs Truby on winning the BBC competition and making such a significant contribution to our county’s identity.

== Other flags ==
=== Armorial banner ===
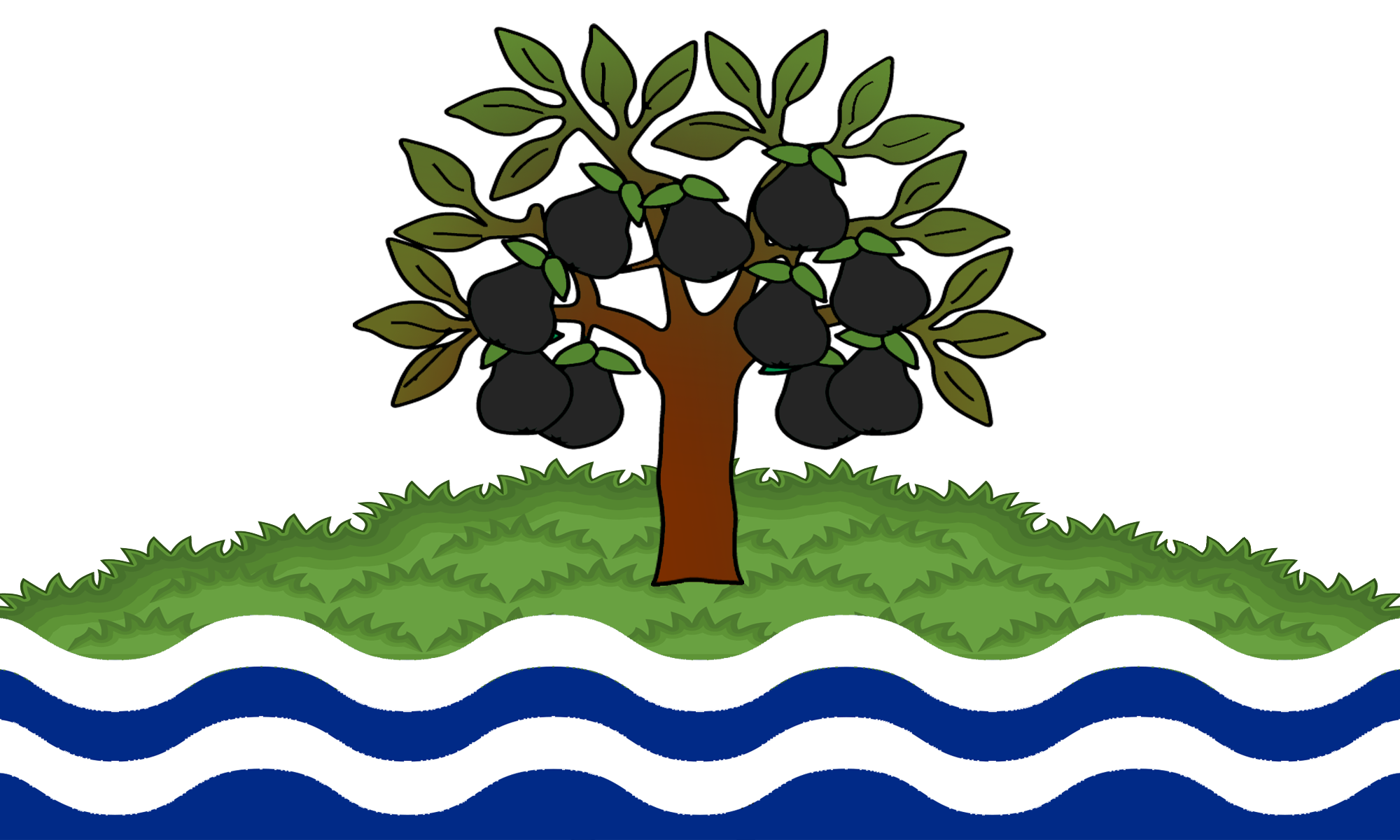
Armorial banner of Worcestershire County Council

An alternate flag offered for sale commercially is a banner of the arms of Worcestershire County Council and as such is the property of the council and only represents it, not the wider county. In the absence of an adopted flag at the time, this council flag had been flown alongside the Union Flag above the Department for Communities and Local Government.
