= Flag of Leicestershire =

Flag of English county

Leicestershire
- Proportion: 3:5
- Adopted: 16 July 2021
- Designed by: Jason Saber

The flag of Leicestershire is the flag of the historic county of Leicestershire, England. It was registered with the Flag Institute on 16 July 2021. Leicestershire was the last English county to have a registered flag.

== Flag design ==
Jason Saber's original proposal

The flag combines three of the county's symbols: the red and white dancetté background, taken from the arms of Simon de Montfort, 6th Earl of Leicester; the cinquefoil of the de Beaumont Earls of Leicester; and the running fox from the county's crest, used on many of the county organisations' emblems.

It was designed by Jason Saber and adopted at the request of all seven of Leicestershire's Members of Parliament. It was the final English county flag to be adopted, and was first flown officially for Historic County Flag Day 2021 in Parliament Square, London.

=== Colours ===
The Pantone colours for the flag are:

Scheme	Red	White	Black
Pantone (paper)	485 C	Safe	Black
HEX	#da291c	#FFFFFF	#000000
CMYK	0, 81, 87, 15	0, 0, 0, 0	0, 0, 0, 100
RGB	218, 41, 28	255, 255, 255	0, 0, 0

== History ==
Armorial banner of Leicestershire County Council

The jagged design of red and white ultimately comes from an arms of Simon de Montfort, who was the 6th Earl of Leicester. (This is just one of several arms used to represent him.) This became a symbol of the county, being used on the arms of the Leicestershire County Council. In “A Complete Guide To Heraldry” by A.C Fox-Davies, he writes of Amaury IV of Évreux, who was 6th in the line Montforts and had a zigzag coat of arms of argent and gules (white and red). Since Simon de Montfort the Younger used the zigzag arms alongside his fathers lion arms, they are believed to be the original arms of the Montforts.

The cinquefoil flower, was based on the arms of Robert De Beaumont, 4th Earl of Leicester, though may be older. It appears on the arms of several towns in Leicestershire. The fox has long been a symbol of Leicestershire, originating with the hunting traditions of the county, and is used on the emblems of many Leicestershire-based organisations.

=== Modern flag ===
In recent times prior to the registration of the flag, a banner of the coat of arms of Leicestershire County Council was often marketed as a county flag for Leicestershire, however legally speaking, this banner represents only the council, and flying it requires its permission. Following the registration of the flag of Herefordshire in 2019, Leicestershire became the only county without a flag.

A public competition was held to select a design for a flag for Leicestershire from six finalists in November 2020. However, no flag design was adopted as a result of the competition, because the fox and cinquefoil design was disqualified as it was available commercially prior to the start of the contest.

2020 competition finalists

Design A: Alexander Minshall

Design B: Ollie Hague

Design C: William Mansell

Design D: Connor Mehew

Design E: Jason Saber (disqualified)

Design F: Anna Milton Lewis

As the competition was abandoned, seven of Leicestershire's MPs wrote to the Flag Institute requesting the fox and cinquefoil design be registered.

== Gallery ==
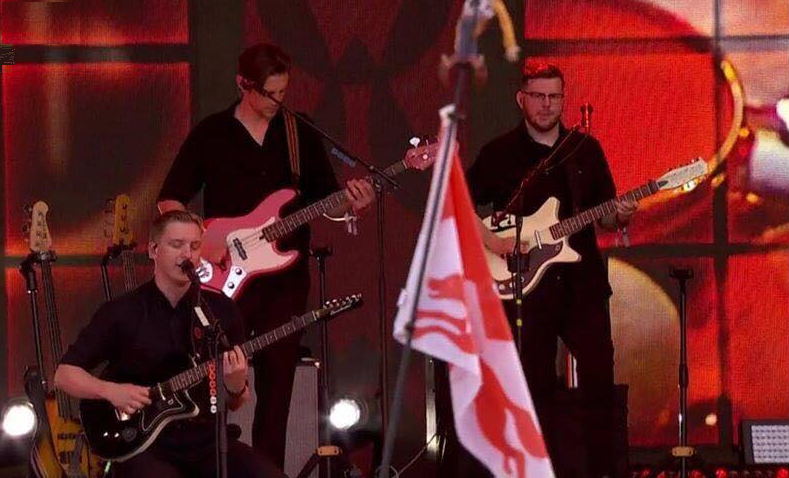
The Fox and Cinqefoil proposal at the Glastonbury Festival

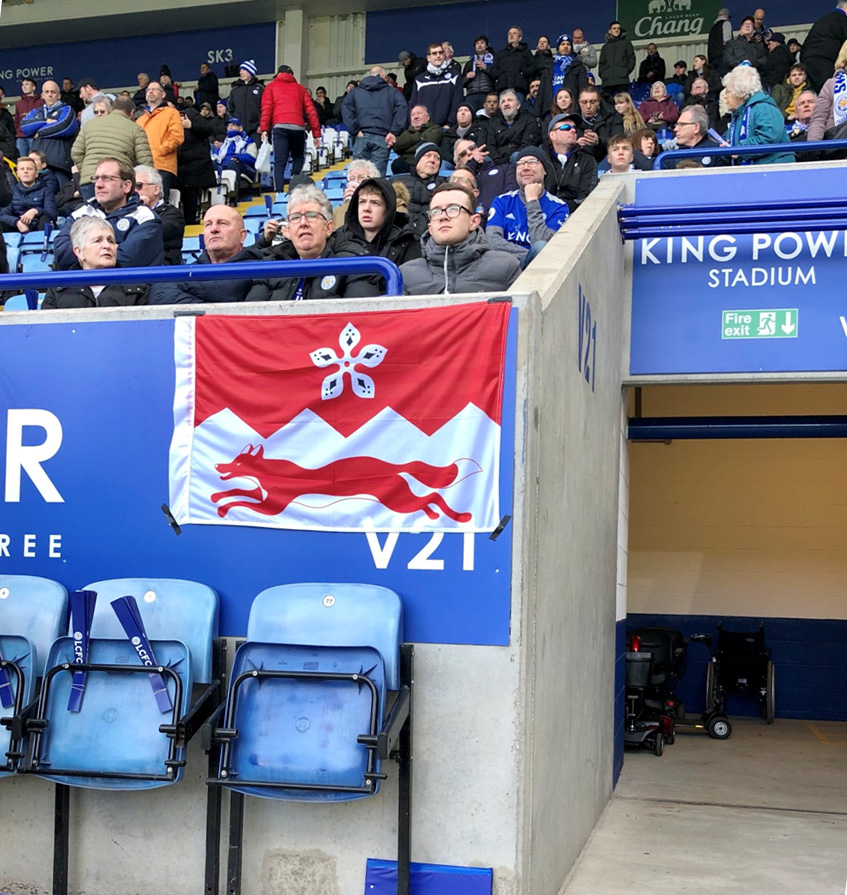
The Fox and Cinqefoil proposal on display by Leicester City fans at the King Power Stadium
