= Ermine (tincture) =

Style of tincture in heraldry

Some of the many variations of ermine spots found in heraldry over the centuries

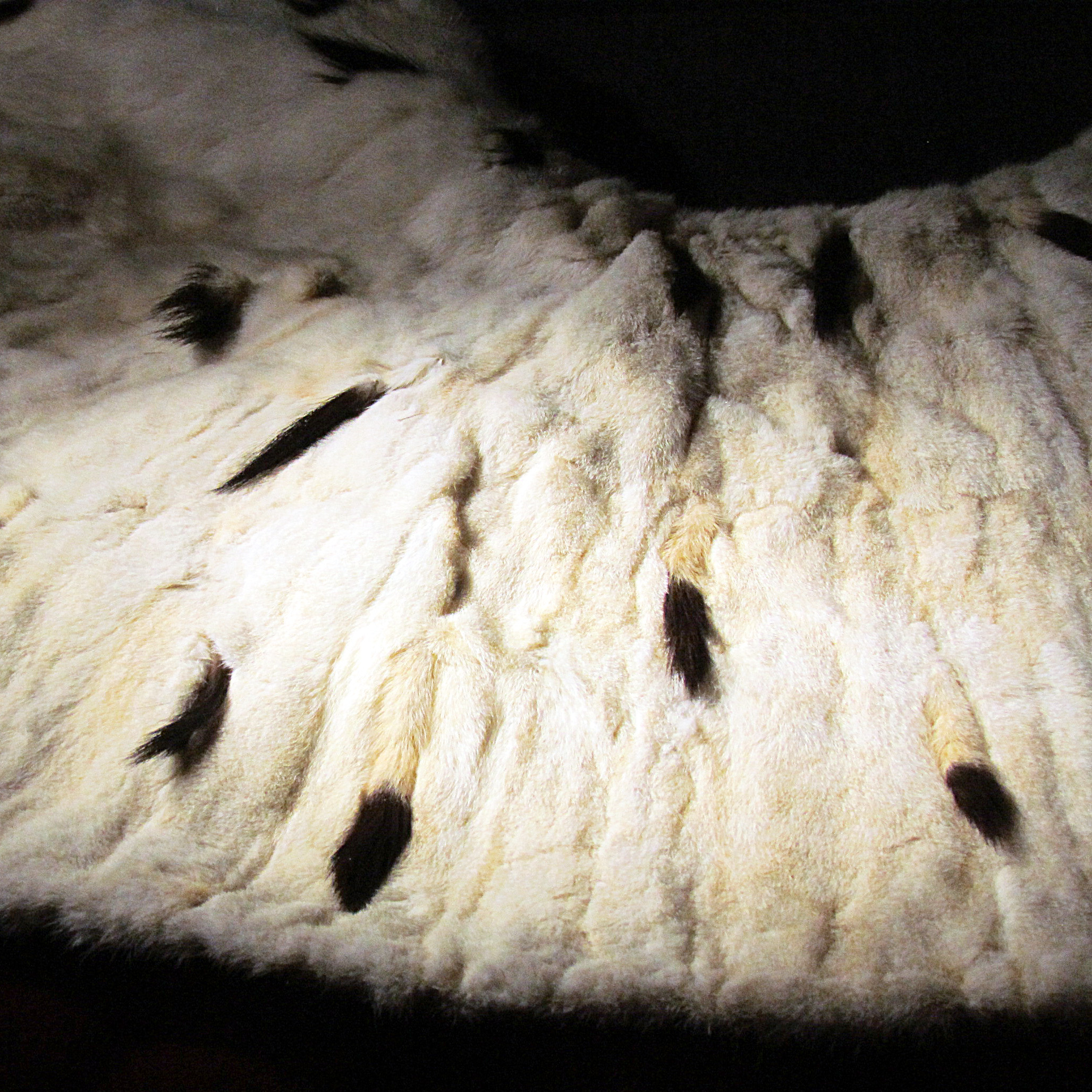
Ermine fur, from the robes of Peter I of Serbia

Ermine (/ˈɜːrmɪn/) in heraldry is a fur, a type of tincture, consisting of a white background with a pattern of black shapes representing the winter coat of the stoat (a species of weasel with white fur and a black-tipped tail). The linings of medieval coronation cloaks and some other garments, usually reserved for use by high-ranking peers and royalty, were made by sewing many ermine furs together to produce a luxurious white fur with patterns of hanging black-tipped tails. Due largely to the association of the ermine fur with the linings of coronation cloaks, crowns and peerage caps, the heraldic tincture of ermine was usually reserved to similar applications in heraldry (i.e., the linings of crowns and chapeaux and of the royal canopy). In heraldry it has become especially associated with the Duchy of Brittany and Breton heraldry.

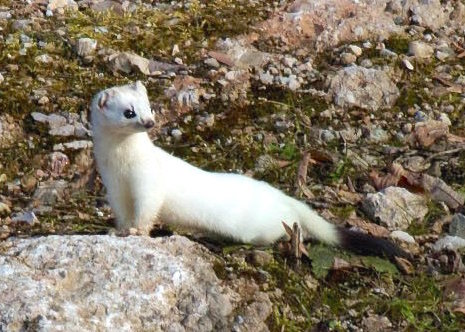
A stoat in winter fur

== Ermine spots ==
The coat of arms of the former Duchy of Brittany, blazoned "Ermine"

The ermine spot, the conventional heraldic representation of the tail, has had a wide variety of shapes over the centuries; its most usual representation has three tufts at the end (bottom), converges to a point at the root (top), and is attached by three studs. When "ermine" is specified as the tincture of the field (or occasionally of a charge), the spots are part of the tincture itself, rather than a semé or pattern of charges. The ermine spot (so specified), however, may also be used singly as a mobile charge, or as a mark of distinction signifying the absence of a blood relationship.

On a bend ermine, the tails follow the line of the bend. In the arms of William John Uncles, the field ermine is cut into bendlike strips by the three bendlets azure, so the ermine tails are (unusually) depicted bendwise.

== Variations ==
Though ermine and vair were the two furs used in early armoury, other variations of these developed later. Both in continental heraldry and British, the fur pattern was used in varying colours as a blazon atop other tinctures (e.g., "d'Or, semé d'hermines de sable" for black ermine spots on a gold field).

British heraldry created three names for specific variants, rather than blazoning them longhand. Ermines is the reverse of ermine – a field sable semé of ermine-spots argent; it is sometimes called counter-ermine (cf. French contre-hermine and German Gegenhermelin). Erminois is ermine with a field or (gold) instead of argent (silver), and pean is the reverse of erminois (i.e., or spots on a field sable); the term is derived from Middle French pene, 'feather.'

Erminites is alleged to be the "same as ermine, except that the two lateral hairs of each spot are red." James Parker mentions it, as does Pimbley, though by the former's admission this is of doubtful existence. Arthur Charles Fox-Davies describes it as a "silly [invention] of former heraldic writers, not of former heralds."

Ermine

Ermines (counter-ermine)

Erminois

Pean

Gules ermined argent

== See also ==
- Flag of Brittany
- Flag of Leicestershire
- Flag of Norfolk
- Flag of Shropshire
- Coat of arms of Australia
- Coat of arms of the University of Cambridge
- Ó Donnagáin coat of arms
- Chudleigh coat of arms

== Bibliography ==
- Fox-Davies, A. C. (1904). The Art of Heraldry: An Encyclopædia of Armory. (1968 edition) New York: Benjamin Blom, Inc. LCCN 68-56481
- Fox-Davies, A. C. (1909). A Complete Guide to Heraldry. (2004 edition) Whitefish, MT: Kessenger Publishing. ISBN 1-4179-0630-8 LCCN 09-23803
