= Flag of Rutland =

Flag of English county

Rutland
- Proportion: 3:5
- Adopted: 17 November 2015

The flag of Rutland is the flag of the English county of Rutland. It was registered with the Flag Institute on 17 November 2015.

The horseshoe has been a symbol of Rutland for centuries, due to a tradition dating back to the Norman Conquest of visiting royals and other persons of rank and status to gift a horseshoe to the Lord. The collected horseshoes are on display on the inside walls of Oakham Castle. The acorns are a reference to oak trees, in turn a reference to the town of Oakham, while the green and yellow has long been codified as the colours for emblems of Rutland.

== History ==
=== Horseshoe ===
Horseshoes have long been used as a symbol for Oakham. Since the Norman Conquest, it became a tradition for anyone of rank who visited the Lord of the Manor of Oakham to bring a horseshoe as a gift. As such, the walls of Oakham Castle are lined with 230 horseshoes, accumulated over the centuries. The castle's constructor, Walchelin de Ferriers, was the great-grandson of Henry de Ferrers, the first Lord of Oakham, and his family coat of arms was a shield bearing six horseshoes, and William de Ferrers, 5th Earl of Derby would later use an arms with a border of eight horseshoes.

Due to the famous horseshoe-giving tradition and its appearance in local heraldry, Rutlandshire (as it was then) became associated with the horseshoe as a symbol. John Speed's 1610 map of Rutlandshire featured a green shield with a horseshoe on it symbolising Oakham in the corner of an inset map of the town. A more official early use of it as an emblem was in 1784, when Thomas Conder used the design of a horseshoe on a shield in his "A New Map of the Counties of Leicester & Rutland, Drawn from the Latest Authorities".

=== Modern flag ===
Coat of arms of Rutland County Council

By the nineteenth century, the symbol of a horseshoe on a shield had been codified as gold on green by most sources. A gold horseshoe appears in the corner of a Grandfather Clock given to new Oakham Workhouse in 1837. Following widespread use, the Rutland County Council began using the system unofficially, while the local police force began wearing horseshoe badges in 1908.

The modern flag is a banner of the arms of Rutland County Council, which were granted to the council in 1950. The description of Rutland's coat of arms is "vert, semée of acorns, a horseshoe or" (i.e. a green ground, on which are strewn acorns, with a horseshoe, in gold). Though the acorns are generally understood to be a reference to the town name of Oakham, some also say that it is a reference to the smallness of the county.

When Rutland regained its status as a county in April 1997, a banner of the arms was raised to demonstrate the restoration of status.

== Design ==
The horseshoe has traditionally been the symbol of Oakham since William the Conqueror gave the 125-square-mile (320 km^{2}) estate to Henry de Ferrers, whose family name suggests a connection with iron-working or the farrier occupation. One of his privileges was to claim the forfeit of a horseshoe from anyone of rank visiting his lordship in Oakham. A unique collection of horseshoes presented by royalty and peers of the realm passing through the manor, hangs on the walls of the Hall in Oakham Castle.

The horseshoe is depicted as asymmetric with three nails on one side and four on the other, which reflects the standard British practice of affixing horseshoes with seven nails.

The thirteen acorns exemplify the former forest, which at one time covered much of the county. It can also be interpreted as representing "smallness and importance" and the oaks suggested by the name of Oakham. The green field represents the county's agriculture, especially its rich pastureland.

The orientation of the horseshoe is in accordance with tradition in the county, and the horseshoes in the Castle are hung this way up. The flag is displayed in a 3:5 ratio.

=== Colours ===
Scheme	Green	Yellow
Refs		
Pantone (paper)	355 C	116 C
HEX	#009639	#ffcd00
CMYK	100, 0, 62, 41	0, 20, 100, 0
RGB	0, 150, 57	255, 205, 0

== See also ==
- Flag of Huntingdonshire
