= Flag of Derbyshire =

Flag of English county

Derbyshire
- Proportion: 3:5
- Adopted: 2006
- Design: Green cross on blue background with gold Tudor Rose in the centre
- Designed by: Martin Enright

The flag of Derbyshire is the flag of the English county of Derbyshire. Created in 2006, the flag has subsequently been registered at the Flag Institute and added to their UK Flags Register.

== History ==
The creation of the flag came about as a result of a feature on Andy Whittaker's breakfast show on BBC Radio Derby in 2006. Jeremy Smith, a listener who had noticed the prominent use of Saint Piran's Flag while visiting Cornwall wanted to know whether Derbyshire had an equivalent symbol. As no flag to represent the county existed, a campaign to design one with the aid of listeners' suggestions was launched. The finished flag, designed by Martin Enright from Derby, was unveiled on 22 September 2006. Ceremonies to mark the first unfurling of the flag were held on the day at various locations around the county, including Derby, Ripley, Ashbourne and Buxton.

== Design ==
The flag features a green cross on a blue background. These colours were chosen to represent Derbyshire's green countryside and its rivers and reservoirs, respectively. In the centre of the flag is a Tudor rose, which has been the county badge since the 15th century. The rose is gold in colour rather than the more usual red and white, partly to differentiate from the emblems of Yorkshire and Lancashire; it is also supposed to symbolise quality.

== Contenders ==
Image	Title	Note
	Design 1	The winning design.
	Design 2	The green stripes represent Derbyshire's lush countryside, while the blue stripe symbolises the rivers that flow through the county. The gold stag's head is a homage to the name of Derby (the Vikings who settled the area in the 10th century named the town "Djura-by", which translated into Old English as "Deoraby" - "village of the deer"), and three stag's heads also appear on the coat of arms of Derbyshire County Council.
	Design 3	This design also employs the Tudor rose, albeit in its standard colours of red and white. The blue is for Derbyshire's rivers and reservoirs, and the green for its countryside.
