= Flag of Bedfordshire =

Flag of English county

Bedfordshire
- Proportion: 3:5
- Adopted: September 2014; 12 years ago
- Designed by: College of Arms

The Bedfordshire flag is the flag of the English county of Bedfordshire. It is based on the banner of the arms of the former Bedfordshire County Council, which was granted the arms in 1951 by the College of Arms. This design was adopted as the flag of the historic county in September 2014, with the support of the High Sheriff of the county.

When flying, the top corner, nearest the flagpole, should be gold.

== History ==
Coat of arms of the former Bedfordshire County Council

Bedfordshire County Council had its coat of arms created in 1951 as part of the Festival of Britain celebrations. The coat of arms became the symbol of the county, being placed on many public buildings and signs. The council used the banner of arms as a flag until it was abolished in 2009.

In 2014, the Friends of Bedfordshire Society began a successful campaign to have a slightly modified version of the former council's banner of arms registered with the Flag Institute as the flag of the county. The minor modification was to transpose the blue and white wavy lines on the left side of the banner, preventing blue from touching red and white from touching yellow on the adopted flag, in line with the heraldic rule of tincture. The adopted design also has a lighter shade of blue than the banner of arms, to better contrast the parts of the design. The campaign to see the flag registered was supported by the High Sheriff of the county.

== Design ==
Arms of the Duke of Bedford

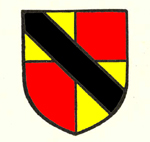
Arms of the Beauchamps, Barons of Bedford

The design of the flag is a composite of several symbols significant to the county. In heraldic terms the design is Quarterly Or and Gules a Fess wavy barry way of four Argent and Azure surmounted by a Pale Sable charged with three Escallops of the third.

The yellow and red quadrants (Quarterly Or and Gules) are taken from the arms of the Beauchamp family, powerful in the county after the Norman conquest of England and constructors of Bedford Castle. The blue and white wavy lines (a Fess wavy barry way of four Argent and Azure) are symbolic of the Great Ouse, which flows through the county, including the county town of Bedford. The three vertically arranged shells (or scallops) on a black panel (a Pale Sable charged with three Escallops) are taken from the coat of arms of the Dukes of Bedford.

== Colours ==
The Pantone colours for the flag are:

- Yellow 109
- Red 485
- Blue 300
- White
- Black

== Usage ==
The flag is flown by town and parish councils across Bedfordshire annually on Bedfordshire Day, 28 November.
