= Flag of Shropshire =

Flag of English county

Shropshire
- Proportion: 3:5
- Adopted: March 2012
- Design: Erminois, three piles issuant two from chief and one from base each bearing a leopard's head.
- Designed by: John Yates

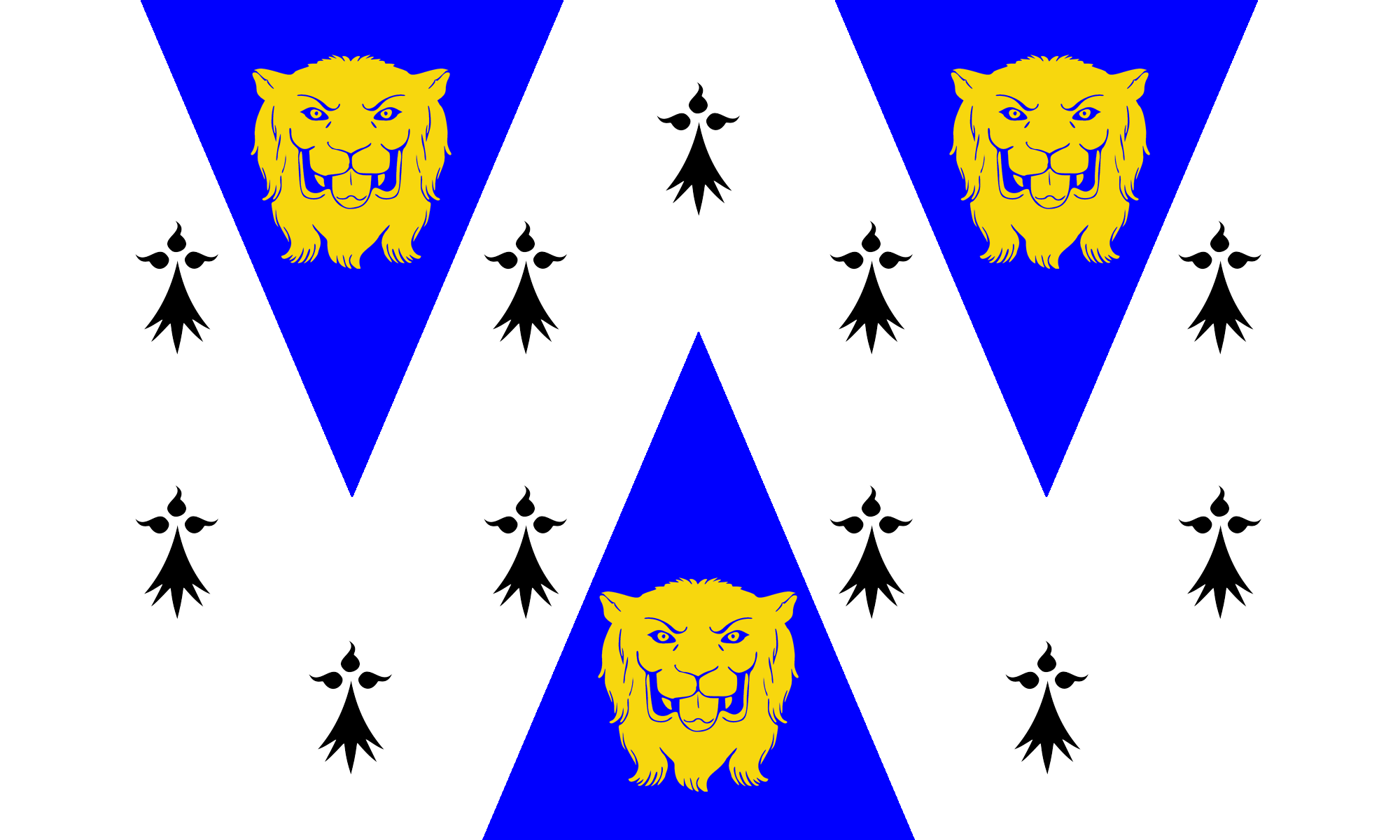
Variant banner of arms

The Shropshire flag is the county flag of Shropshire. It was registered with the Flag Institute in March 2012 and officially became the county's flag on 19 April 2013. The flag has an ermine yellow field, with three piles bearing the faces of leopards. It was based on the banner of arms of Shropshire County Council, itself based on the flag of Shrewsbury, which was first recorded in the 17th century.

== History ==
The flag is a banner of the arms of the former Shropshire (or Salop) County Council which were awarded in 1895. The "gold" erminois aspect differentiates the county arms/flag from those of its county town.

=== Leopard symbolism ===
The leopards' faces, referred to as "loggerheads" locally, are a traditional emblem for Shropshire and several of its towns. It is believed that the loggerheads derive from the Royal Arms of England and that the blue and yellow colours represent those of Roger de Montgomery, Earl of Shrewsbury. Loggerheads also appeared on the Shrewsbury town arms, themselves first recorded in 1623, solidifying their connections to the local area. The name is thought to have originated from the practice of carving such a design on the head of the log used as a battering ram. It is unclear whence the feline heads originated, though some speculate they were based on the three lions on the Coat of arms of England.

The species of the animal whose face is depicted is also debated - whether they are leopards, as it traditionally held, or lions. The idea that they're leopards originates with a late 17th century document, which describe the animals on the Shrewsbury arms as leopards, which seems to be the main source. It is not uncommon for feline representations in heraldry to be ambiguous.

Although based on the town arms of Shrewsbury, the county council arms differ by moving the leopards’ faces from a shield to specifically appear on three “piles” (triangles), two pointing down and one up, forming an erminois “w” shape in the negative space. This is known in heraldry terminology a “fess dancetty”. These arms were awarded to the county council on June 18th 1896, shortly after its foundation and, according to the Flag Institute, were designed College of Arms, although there exists no record of why they opted for this change

=== Modern flag ===
The flag (with the short-lived "white" ermine pattern instead of the erminois) was flown above the Department for Communities and Local Government in April 2011 as part of a scheme to promote traditional English counties.

On 23 July 2019, the flag of Shropshire was flown among others in Parliament Square in celebration of Historic County Flags Day.

== Design ==
Erminois, three blue piles issuant two from chief and one from base each bearing a yellow leopard's head, all on a field of yellow. The design is classed as "Traditional" by the Flag Institute, as it is based on the banner of arms of the Shropshire county council, granted in 1895. The symbol of lions is based on the town coat of arms of Shrewsbury.

=== Colours ===
The colours of the Shropshire flag are:

Scheme	Blue	Yellow	Black
Pantone (Paper)	Reflex Blue C	Yellow C	Black
Web colours	#001489	#FEDD00	#000000
RGB	0, 20, 137	254, 221, 0	0, 0, 0
CMYK	100%, 85%, 0%, 46%	0%, 13%, 100%, 0%	0%, 0%, 0%, 100%
