= Flag of Northumberland =

Flag of English county

- Northumberland
- Proportion: 5:8
- Adopted: 1951; 75 years ago
- Design: Paly of eight Or and Gules per fess embattled all counterchanged
- Designed by: College of Arms

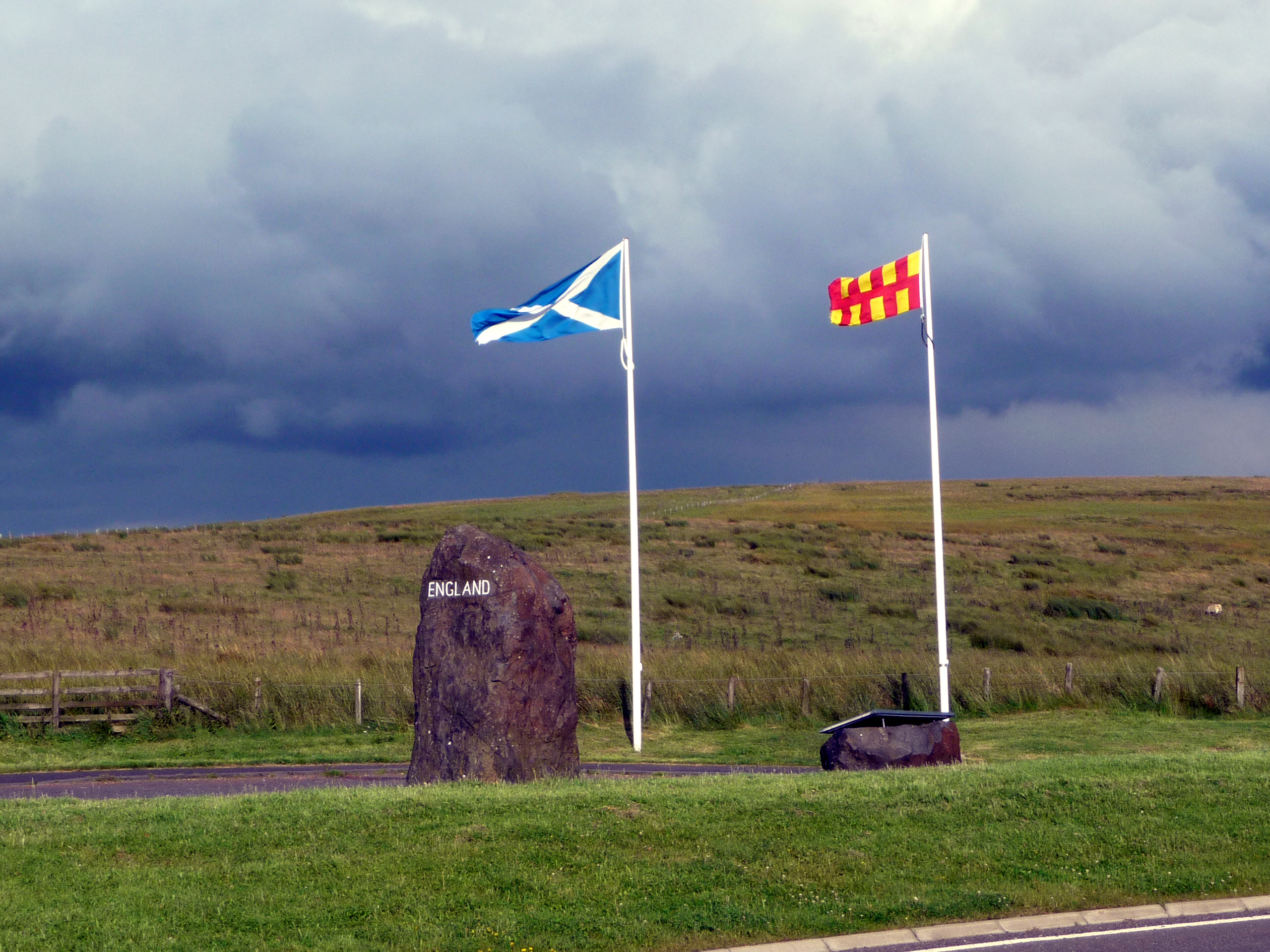
Scottish and Northumberland flags at Carter Bar

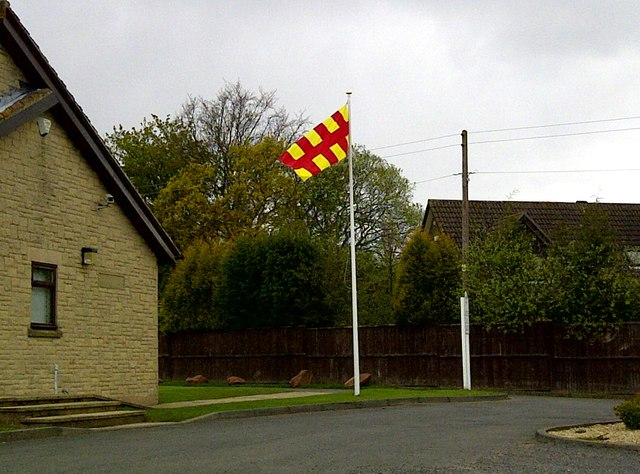
The flag flying in Newton-on-the-Moor

The flag of Northumberland is the banner of arms of Northumberland County Council. It is also used to represent Northumberland in general, and unofficially to represent the area within the historic boundaries of the county.

The design is the same as the coat of arms of the county council, granted in 1951; the heraldic blazon, or description, of the arms is Paly of eight Or and Gules per fess embattled all counterchanged. It is based on the arms medieval heralds attributed to the Kingdom of Bernicia based on a brief description by the historian Bede of a flag used on the tomb of St Oswald in the 7th century. The flag should be flown so that the top corner nearest the hoist is gold.

In November 1995, the county council agreed to allow the flag to be flown anywhere in the county. In 2000, a spokesman for the county council stated that the "flag should only be rightfully flown within the present administrative County of Northumberland".

The Flag Institute, a vexillological charity, has included the flag in its "Flag Registry" and considers it to represent the area within the historic county boundaries, which includes northern Tyne and Wear.

== Design ==
The flag is in a 5:8 ratio, and shows a pattern of offset pallettes - a sequence of pales, in red and yellow. It is based on the arms medieval heralds attributed to the Kingdom of Bernicia based on a brief description by the historian Bede of a flag used on the tomb of St Oswald in the 7th century. The depiction of the stripes on the arms the flag is based on is unique in that each red bar is outlined separately, which is supposed to represent the interlocking stones in Hadrian’s Wall. This detail is not generally included on the flag.

=== Colours ===
The Pantone colours for the flag are:

Scheme	Red	Yellow
Pantone (paper)	485 C	109 C
HEX	#DA291C	#f7d417
CMYK	0, 81, 87, 15	0, 14, 91, 3
RGB	217, 41, 28	247, 213, 22

== History ==
=== Origins ===
What was to become Northumbria started as two kingdoms, Deira in the south and Bernicia in the north. Conflict in the first half of the seventh century ended with the murder of the last king of Deira in 651, and Northumbria was thereafter unified under Bernician kings, firstly Oswald of Northumbria. The Venerable Bede described Oswald’s baner as a "banner made of gold and purple", likely leading to the alternating bars design to be associated with Bernicia. Reportedly the same colours were flown by Henry Percy, first Earl of Northumberland. The stripes were published in 1675 by Sir Winston Churchill (ancestor of the 20th century British Prime Minister) as the emblem of the Kingdom of Northumberland in “Divi Britannici”.

=== Modern use ===
The Northumberland County Council were formally awarded a coat of arms with this design on the shield in 1951, though they had informally used a modified version of these attributed arms of Bernicia prior to this, and it remained a symbol that represented the county as a whole. The county council released the flag for use by the public on 15 November 1995, and it was registered to the Flag Institute upon its creation of the county flag registry. In 2011 Northumberland’s flag flew at the Headquarters of the Department of Communities and Local Government in London, alongside flags of the other counties of England. The Leader of Northumberland County Council said:

The Northumberland flag has perhaps the longest history of any flag in the country and is still flown locally with great pride today. Northumberland is one of England’s most rural and northerly counties so we are delighted that the flag is being flown down in London. This is an imaginative way of celebrating the unique and rich heritage of both our country and county.

Northumberland’s flag flies at two border crossings between Northumberland and Scotland; Carter Bar and Berwick-upon-Tweed.
