= Flag of Norfolk =

Flag of English county

Norfolk
- Proportion: 3:5
- Adopted: 11 September 2014
- Design: A vertical bi-colour of gold and black, with a white bend dexter bearing nine alternating black ermine spots between pairs and singles.
- Designed by: Traditional

The flag of the English county of Norfolk consists of a vertical bi-colour of gold and black, with a white bend bearing nine black ermine spots alternating between pairs and singles. It was officially registered on 11 September 2014 as a traditional county flag, following a campaign by Norfolk resident Dominic Victor Maverick Smith.

== Design and symbolism ==
The flag's design is the banner of arms attributed to the first Earl of Norfolk, Ralph de Gael. This 12th-century design has been associated with the county ever since, appearing on maps and books and forming the basis of the county council arms awarded in 1904. It is thought that the ermine bend (the diagonal stripe from top left to bottom right) found in the design may be a reference to Brittany, where Ralph was Lord of Gaël; the dukes of Brittany bore a shield of plain ermine, and accordingly ermine figures in much Breton heraldry, including the regional flag. This ermine pattern has had differing designs but for the registration a precise form was chosen in consultation with the Flag Institute and a flag bearing this design was commissioned by the Association of British Counties. This pattern was duly registered.

=== Colours ===
The colours of the flag are:

Scheme	Yellow	Black	White
Pantone	Gold 123C	Black	White
RGB	255-199-44	0-0-0	255-255-255
Web colors	#ffc72c	#000000	#FFFFFF
CMYK	0-22-83-0	0-0-0-100	0-0-0-0

== History ==
The design is a banner of the arms attributed to Ralph de Gael, first Earl of Norfolk. The arms were awarded to the local council in 1904 by the College Of Arms, on behalf of King Edward VII. This became a common symbol of the county in general, though its official use was limited to the council, leading to it being the obvious design for a county flag. It is thought that the ermine bendon the arms may have been a nod to Brittany, a place where ermine is a common local emblem and where Ralph was Lord of Gael.

The De Gael arms appeared on John Speed's 1610 map of Norfolk and were later featured at a 1929 medieval pageant. The design has been used by an emblem for local organisations such as historical societies and sports clubs, including the Norfolk Broads Yacht Club. Various local groups expressed their enthusiasm, and as such Dominic Smith, in consultation with the Flag Institute, standardised the flag and it was duly registered, and flown on Historic County Flags Day on July 23rd, 2014 by the Association of British Counties.
