= Flag of Suffolk =

Flag of English county

Suffolk
- Proportion: 3:5
- Adopted: 9 October 2017
- Designed by: Traditional

The Suffolk flag is the registered flag of the county of Suffolk, England. It was registered with the Flag Institute on 9 October 2017. The Flag Institute registered the design after Suffolk County Council displayed the flag on the first "Suffolk Day", and after a number of requests by organisations in the county.

== Design ==
The design is the Saint Edmund's medieval banner of arms. It is two gold arrows passing through a gold crown or with heraldic description as Azure two Arrows in saltire, points downwards, enfiled with an ancient Crown Or.

=== Colours ===
The colours of the flag are:

Scheme	Blue	Yellow	Gold
Pantone (paper)	300 C	116 C	125 C
HEX	#005eb8	#FFCD00	#b58500
CMYK	100, 49, 0, 28	0, 20, 100, 0	0, 27, 100, 29
RGB	0, 94, 184	255, 205, 0	181, 132, 0

== History ==
=== Origin ===
Edmund, the Anglo-Saxon king of East Anglia, is strongly connected with Suffolk with his burial site located in the county at Bury St Edmunds. It can be seen across the county; incorporated into the county and several town coat of arms as well as association badges or logos and sporting bodies. Edmund was reportedly murdered by the Danes in 870, and in a meeting with them, he refused to share his kingdom, and he was bound to a tree, shot with arrows and then decapitated. This is the widely held story of the origin of the arrows in his emblem.

Several sites have been claimed to be the site of the event, but the most promising is Abbey Hill, just outside Hoxne.

A tree claimed to be the one on which Edmund died on the hill collapsed in the nineteenth century, where its age was determined to be appropriate, and several iron points were discovered in the trunk. A monument with the arms was put at the site.

=== Modern use ===
Following its hoisting by the County Council, to celebrate the yearly Suffolk Day on 21 June 2017, a campaign was initiated to register the armorial banner of Saint Edmund. It was supported by twenty-one county based organisations and in light of this local support as well as the emblem's extensive use across the county, the flag was registered by the Flag Institute.
