= Flag of Northamptonshire =

Flag of English county

Northamptonshire
- Proportion: 3:5
- Adopted: 11 September 2014
- Design: Gold cross fimbriated in black on a maroon background with a rose in the centre
- Designed by: Brady Ells and Ian Chadwick

The Northamptonshire flag is used to represent the historic county of Northamptonshire, England. It was registered by the Flag Institute on 11 September, 2014.

== Design ==
The flag is a gold cross, fimbriated in black on a maroon field, with a maroon rose in the centre.

=== Colours ===
The colours on the flag are:

| Scheme | Black | Maroon | Gold | Maroon | Green |
|---|---|---|---|---|---|
| Pantone (paper) | Black | 201 C | 123 C | 222 C | 354 C |
| HEX | #000000 | #9d2235 | #ffc72c | #6c1d45 | #00b140 |
| CMYK | 0, 0, 0, 100 | 0, 78, 66, 38 | 0, 22, 83, 0 | 0, 73, 36, 58 | 100, 0, 64, 31 |
| RGB | 0, 0, 0 | 158, 35, 54 | 255, 199, 43 | 107, 29, 69 | 0, 177, 64 |

== History ==
The red rose is a common symbol of Northamptonshire, with the county's nickname being "The Red Rose of the Shires". It was apparently first used to represent Northamptonshire in 1665 by the magistrates in the court of quarter sessions, chosen since Elizabeth Woodville, wife of Edward IV, was born in Grafton Regis. It was used for centuries as a symbol of Northamptonshire by locally based organisations, including the local council, who used it prior to and following their official awarding of arms in 1939.

=== 2014 competition ===
The flag was designed by Brady Ells and Ian Chadwick. It was the winning design of a shortlist of four put forward for a public vote. The cross represents the county's location as a crossroads in England, the colours were inspired by the county's cricket team and county town's football team, and the black border represents the county's leather industry. A rose, designed by Emma Rayif, was selected for the centre, as it has long been a symbol for the county. The rose design was created based on research into roses used in the past to represent the county, and the final design included elements of these historic depictions. The shortlist of designs was:

Design 1

Design 2

Design 3

Design 4 (winner)

The rose was deliberately designed to be unique to Northamptonshire, as the flag of Hampshire features a similar Tudor rose. Emma Rayif altered the design so as to adopt the maroon colour used by the local cricket club and the cinquefoil shape from the council emblem. It also points upwards, to represent the "North" in Northamptonshire, and contrast it with the down-pointing rose of the Hampshire flag. The winning design was unveiled at a ceremony in County Hall on September 11th 2014 and was registered by the Flag Institute. The ceremony was attended by local dignitaries like the Lord Lieutenant, David Laing.

== Use ==
The flag was unveiled at a special ceremony at the Northamptonshire County Hall by Northamptonshire County Council. It was raised above the building on 25 October 2014 to coincide with the newly created County Day, held on St Crispin's Day.
