= Flag of Cambridgeshire =

English county flag

Cambridgeshire
- Proportion: 3:5
- Adopted: 1 February 2015
- Designed by: Brady Ells

The Cambridgeshire Flag is the flag of the traditional English county of Cambridgeshire. It was registered with the Flag Institute on 1 February 2015, after being voted the winner of a design competition.

== Design ==
The background is the same shade of blue as the shield from the regional flag of East Anglia, of which Cambridgeshire is part. The pattern of three gold Saxon crowns arranged two-above-and-one-below is also taken from the East Anglian flag. The two wavy lines (the shade of which is Cambridge Blue, the colour of the University of Cambridge) represent the River Cam.

| Colours scheme | Royal Blue | Yellow | Cambridge Blue |
|---|---|---|---|
| RGB | R: 0, G: 51, B: 160 | R: 255, G: 210, B: 0 | R: 163, G: 193, B: 173 |
| Hexadecimal | #0033A0 | #FFD200 | #A3C1AD |
| CMYK | C: 100%, M: 68%, Y: 0%, K: 37% | C: 0%, M: 18%, Y: 100%, K: 0% | C: 16%, M: 0%, Y: 10%, K: 24% |
| Pantone | 286 C | 123 C | 558 C |

== Competition ==
The competition was organised by adventurer and flag enthusiast Andy Strangeway from Yorkshire, in conjunction with the Flag Institute. It launched in May 2014.

Overall, 17 entries were submitted. A final shortlist of six designs was selected by a judging panel, and put to a public vote on 23 November 2014, with voting remaining open until 31 December.

The winning design was announced on 1 February 2015. The designer was Brady Ells of Sussex.

=== Contenders ===
Design A

The wavy light blue stripe symbolises the River Cam, with the vertical dark blue stripe representing the various bridges that span the river. Together, these serve as a homage to the origins of the county's name ("Cam-Bridge-Shire"). The three gold crowns come from the traditional flag of East Anglia.

Design B

The winning design.

Design C

The three gold crowns on red reference the Isle of Ely, where they appear on the arms of the Diocese, as well as on the arms of the former administrative county council. The wavy blue line symbolises the River Cam. The three fleur-de-lis represent the city of Cambridge (the arms of the city council features a single fleur-de-lis).

Design D

Purple and gold are the county colours of Cambridgeshire. The two crowns symbolise the coronet of Ely, with the Wake knot in between them serving as a homage to folk hero Hereward the Wake. The book stands for the University of Cambridge, the coat of arms of which features a book in the centre.

Design E

The blue field symbolises Cambridgeshire's various waterways, while the yellow stripes represent the county's rich farmlands. The Fen Tiger serves as both a homage to the Cambridgeshire Regiment, which was nicknamed the "Fen Tigers", as well as more generally to the people of the Fens, which covers a large part of the county.

Design F

The blue stripe symbolises Cambridgeshire's numerous rivers and waterways, while the two green stripes stand for its vast agricultural land. The yellow border evokes the enlightenment and wealth generated from the county's universities, industry, and scientific and technological endeavours. The fleur-de-lis represent the city of Cambridge.

== Flag of Cambridgeshire County Council ==
Flag of Cambridgeshire County Council

The flag of Cambridgeshire County Council is a banner of the council's coat of arms, which were granted on 1 November 1976. The three wavy blue lines represent the three main rivers of the area; the River Cam, the River Great Ouse and the River Nene. The two straight blue lines symbolise the numerous drainage ditches of the Fens. The surrounding red border and fleur-de-lis shapes are derived from the Royal arms of Scotland, as a homage to the fact that the Earldom of Huntingdon and Cambridge was held by successive Scottish kings in the 12th and early 13th centuries.

== See also ==
Similar emblems

- Flag of Munster
- Coat of arms of Sweden
- Coat of arms of the University of Oxford
