= Flag of Cheshire =

Flag of English county

Cheshire
- Proportion: 3:5
- Adopted: 10 April 2013
- Designed by: Historic

Coat of arms granted to the Cheshire County Council in 1976

The flag of the county of Cheshire in North West England is three golden sheaves of wheat and a golden blade on a blue background. It was registered by the Flag Institute on 10 April 2013, the design being a banner of arms of the former Cheshire County Council, granted on 3 May 1938.

== Design ==
The design is in a 3:5 ratio, and features three golden sheaves of wheat arranged around an upward-pointing sword, all in gold on a field of blue.

=== Colours ===
The colours on the flag of Cheshire are:

Scheme	Blue	Gold	Brown
Pantone (Paper)	286 C	109 C	112 C
Web colours	#0033A0	#FFD100	#9C8412
RGB	0, 51, 160	255, 209, 0	156, 132, 18
CMYK	100%, 68%, 0%, 37%	0%, 18%, 100%, 0%	0%, 15%, 88%, 39%

== History ==
The oldest ancestor of what would become the modern flag of Cheshire is the arms of Hugh of Cyfeiliog, 5th Earl of Chester in the late 12th century, depicting 6 golden sheaves of wheat. His son, Ranulf de Blondeville, 6th Earl of Chester, reduced this number to three. This design, with a dagger added to it, has been used in the coat of arms of Chester since at least 1560. The origin of the dagger in question is purportedly that the Earl held the lands of the County Palatinate "as freely by his sword as the King of England held by his crown".

A different coat of arms was granted to Cheshire in 1580 by Queen Elizabeth I, which depicted the de Blondeville sheaves of wheat on a blue field split in twain, with the other half occupied by three golden lions passant on a red field, the Coat of arms of England. Despite this, the assay office of Chester continued to use the de Blondeville coat of arms for several centuries. In 1938, the county council were granted arms much closer to the original coat of arms, with lions supporting the de Blondeville shield, including the dagger.

Throughout the twentieth century, the three sheaves of wheat and dagger design continued to be used as the insignia for various Cheshire-related organisations, such as emergency services, sports clubs, etc. Though the Cheshire County Council disbanded in 2009, the flag continued to be commercially available as a technically unofficial flag of Cheshire, and many Cheshire-based organisations, including the local sports clubs, History association and Civic societies all lobbied for its registration, which was made official with the Flag Institute in 2013.

== Use ==
The flag has been flown alongside the Union Flag above the Department for Communities and Local Government. Stockport County have had a Cheshire Flag Day to commemorate Stockport's roots in the historic county of Chester.

The wheat sheaves and blue background are incorporated into the logo for Cheshire West and Chester Council and the wheat sheaves are incorporated into the logo for Cheshire East Council. Additionally, the logo of Stockport County F.C. features the three golden sheaves of wheat and golden blade on a blue background as its escutcheon.

The coat of arms can be seen on the Eastgate Bridge in Chester.
