= Flag of Huntingdonshire =

Flag of English county

Huntingdonshire
- Proportion: 3:5
- Adopted: 25 June 2009
- Designed by: The Huntingdonshire Society

The flag of Huntingdonshire is the county flag for the historic county of Huntingdonshire in England. It was enrolled on the UK Flags Register by the Flag Institute on 25 June 2009.

== Origin ==
The Huntingdonshire Society's original proposal

The flag was first proposed by Rupert Barnes of the Huntingdonshire Society which promotes the traditional county status of Huntingdonshire. The Society's original design was published in June 2007.

In 2009, Graham Bartram, the Chief Vexillologist of the Flag Institute, proposed alterations to the design, which the Society accepted. This latter design was registered as the county flag.

== Design ==
The flag was not an entirely original design; it is contained in the arms which the College of Arms granted in 1937 to Huntingdonshire County Council and which are now borne by Huntingdonshire District Council. The full achievement of the Huntingdonshire arms features as a crest:

On a Wreath of Argent and Azure a Lion rampant Gules gorged with a Collar flory counter-flory Or and supporting a Staff proper flying therefrom a Banner Vert charged with a Hunting Horn stringed Or

This banner, in plain English a green flag with a gold, beribboned hunting horn, then formed the basis of the county flag design.

The hunting horn as a symbol for the town of Huntingdon or for Huntingdonshire appears also on older civic heraldry, for example the arms of the former Borough of Huntingdon and Godmanchester.

The flag's aspect ratio is 3:5.

The Pantone Colours for the flag are:

- Green 355,
- Yellow
