= Flag of Gloucestershire =

Flag of English county

Gloucestershire
- Severn Cross
- Proportion: 1:2
- Adopted: March 2008
- Design: Cross of mid-blue, outlined in cream, against an apple green background
- Designed by: Jeremy Bentall

The Gloucestershire County Council Banner of the Arms

The Gloucestershire flag, also known as the Severn Cross, was the winning entry in a competition held by the then High Sheriff of Gloucestershire, Jonathan Carr, to commemorate the 1000th anniversary of the county in March 2008. Prior to 2008, the banner of arms for Gloucestershire County Council was used as the de facto flag for the county. The new flag is coloured blue, cream and green, representing the River Severn, Cotswold stone and the Golden Valley, Stroud respectively.

== History ==
Prior to 2008, there was a flag of Gloucestershire available, but was actually the banner of arms for Gloucestershire County Council and therefore not the county flag. The new flag was registered in March 2008, and is named the Severn Cross.

The design was the winning entry in a 2008 competition, judged by High Sheriff of Gloucestershire, Jonathan Carr, in celebration of a millennium of the county's existence. In addition, Carr stated that many counties of the West Country had their own flags and this anniversary presented the opportunity to add Gloucestershire's flag. In addition, the winner would take home a prize of £250.

The competition had over 1000 entries, and the winning entry was designed by Jeremy Bentail, a mental health worker. The 80 best entries were then displayed at the Shire Hall. Once the winner had been chosen, the first thirty flags produced were flown by district councils and University of Gloucestershire.

== Design ==
The flag comprises a cross of mid-blue, outlined in cream, against an apple green background. The blue represents the River Severn, the green represents the Golden Valley, Stroud and the cream represents Cotswold stone.

== See also ==
- List of English flags
- List of British flags
