= Black Worcester pear =

Edible fruit cultivar

'Black Worcester' Pear
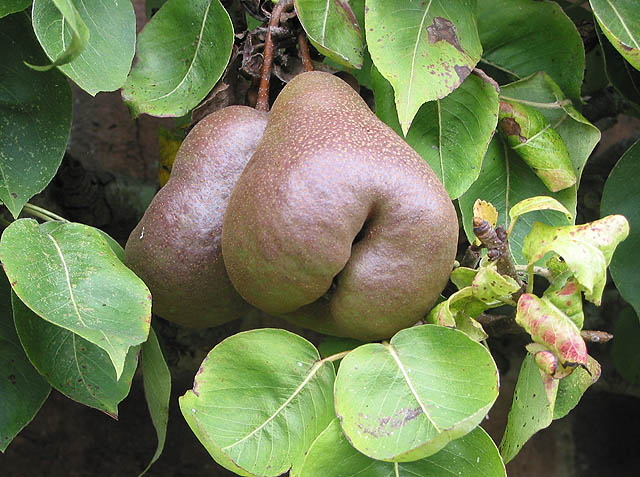
- 'Worcester Black' Pears at Westbury Court Garden. The dull, purple-like skin gives the fruit a black appearance and hence the name
- Genus: Pyrus
- Species: Pyrus communis
- Cultivar: 'Black Worcester'

The black Worcester pear (also known as Parkinson's Warden and the Worcester Black Pear) is a cultivar of the European pear (Pyrus communis). It may have come to the British Isles via the Romans and has been used in heraldry and around the city of Worcester. The dark fruit is mainly used for cooking or culinary uses.

== History ==
It is thought it may have come to the UK by the Romans and was first mentioned at the Cistercian built Abbey of Warden in Bedfordshire in the 13th century. It may also be linked to the French pear ‘de Livre’. 'Black Worcester' was recorded as being grown by monks at the Abbey as early as 1388. As a long keeping fruit, it formed an important part of the winter diet until root-crops were introduced. The fruit is larger than average and the flesh hard and coarse, but is reported to be excellent when stewed. It may also have been used to make perry.

In the 1990s and 2000s, Worcestershire County Council created a 'Fruit Trees for Worcestershire' scheme, in which several hundred young black pear trees were planted. The cultivar is a tentatively accepted name by the RHS.

== Heraldry ==
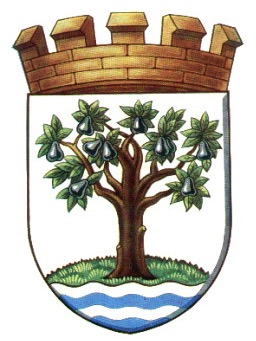
Arms of Worcestershire County Council, featuring a tree bearing black pears

Pears formed part of the provisions of the troops at Agincourt in 1415, where Worcestershire bowmen carried banners depicting a pear tree laden with fruit. Michael Drayton's poem of the battle, notes “Wor’ster a pear tree laden with its fruit”.

On Queen Elizabeth I's visit to the city of Worcester in August 1575, the city authorities ordered a black pear fruit-laden tree to be transplanted to the Foregate from Whystone Farm, in her honour. So admiring was she of the good management that had allowed the fruit to remain unplucked that she granted an augmentation of honour of a canton charged with "three pears sable" to be added to the city's coat of arms.

Up until amalgamation with the Warwickshire Yeomanry in 1956, the Worcestershire Yeomanry used an image of the pear blossom for badges. It is still used on the County Council and County Cricket Club badge.

Specific varieties of pear are seldom mentioned in heraldic blazons, although "Warden pears" are blazoned as canting arms for the family of Warden. Pears feature in the canting arms of the families of Parincheff and Periton.

== Warden Pear ==
The name of 'Warden pear' may refer to any one of a number of pear varieties that do not truly ripen and must therefore be cooked to be edible. They are used to make "Warden pies"; "I must have Saffron to colour the Warden Pies" (Shakespeare, The Winter's Tale iv.3). In Two Fifteenth-Century Cookery-Books, edited by Thomas Austin for the Early English Text Society (Original Series, Volume 91), a recipe is given (p. 51) for "Quyncis or Wardouns in past" Also known as 'Parkinson's Warden'.

== Description ==
The fruits are up to 78mm (3″) wide and 85mm long, and can weigh as much as 260g. The skin is a dark mahogany colour with russet freckles and small areas of rough skin. The flesh is a pale yellow or cream, tinged green under the skin.

They should be picked in October or early November, when it is crisp, hard and gritty then they can be stored until April. This does not require refrigeration, hence why they were so valuable in the past, as they could be used by troops when on long-distance travels. They are also sharp and bitter until cooked. There are many old recipes involving the black pears.

They have good disease resistance and some Scab resistance.
