= Flag of Plymouth =

Flag of English city

Plymouth
- Proportion: 1:2
- Design: White shield, containing a green diagonal cross separating four black towers, on a field of red

The flag of Plymouth is the flag of the port city and unitary authority of Plymouth in Devon, United Kingdom. It consists of a white shield, containing a green diagonal cross separating four black towers, on a field of red.

== Symbolism ==
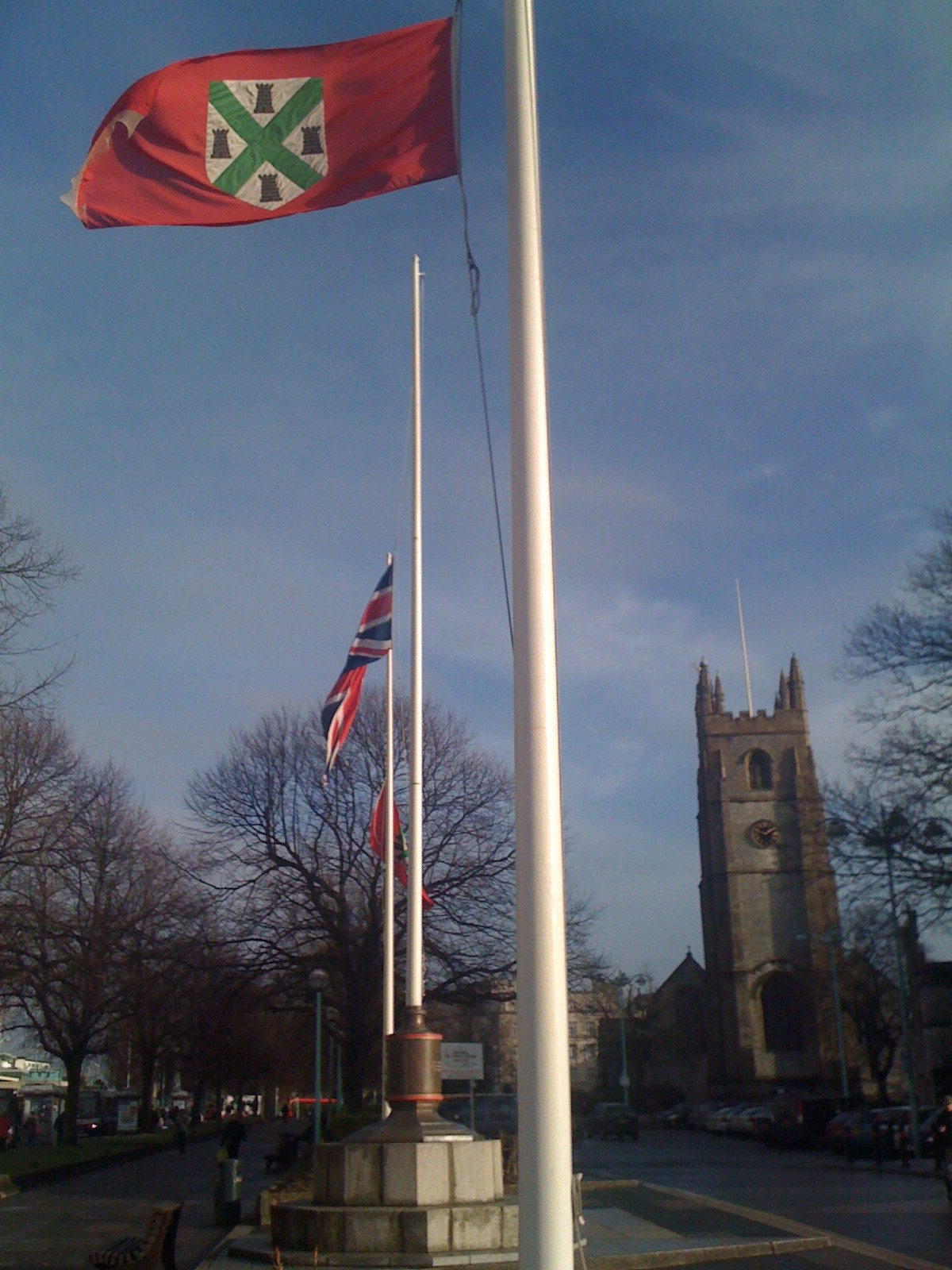
Plymouth flag alongside Union Jack at Plymouth Guildhall, with St Andrews Church visible in background

=== Towers ===
The four towers of the flag represent the four forts surrounding and defending the city dating back to the English Civil War era, and are visible on the city council's coat of arms.

The city's motto, turris fortissima est nomen jehova translates as the 'strongest tower is the name of Jehovah', and this refers to the city's successful resistance to the Royalist siege during that conflict.

=== Colours ===
The green, black and white colours of the shield appear to be traditional in the city, and the wider county of Devon, as they are used as part of several school uniforms in the city, the colours of Plymouth Argyle Football Club and Plymouth Albion RFC, and as the colours of the Flag of Devon.
