= Flag of Berkshire =

Flag of English county

Berkshire
- Proportion: 3:5
- Adopted: 2 March 2017; 9 years ago
- Designed by: Traditional

The Flag of Berkshire is the flag of the historic county of Berkshire in England. The flag was registered with the Flag Institute as the flag of the county in March 2017. The flag was adopted after the design was submitted by a number of county-based bodies as well as the Lord Lieutenant of the county. Prior to adoption, a banner of the arms of the former Berkshire County Council (abolished in 1998) had been occasionally used to represent the county.

== Design ==
The flag features a traditional symbol of the county, the stag and oak. This design's connection with the county dates from at least Michael Drayton's 1627 poem Battle of Agincourt, where he describes the men of Berkshire marching under the symbol of "a Stag, under an Oake that stood". The stag has twelve-point antlers (characteristic of "royal stag" red deer), a reference to the county's title as the "Royal County of Berkshire". The stag and oak together represent the county's forestry and deer herds. The Flag Institute considers the design to be "traditional".

== Previous proposals ==
Prior to the adoption in March 2017, there had been a number of proposals for a Berkshire flag. The majority of these designs also featuring the stag and oak.

In 2006, Berkshire historian David Nash Ford proposed a flag design, which featured the stag standing under an oak tree on a background of white and blue. The design, loosely based on the flag of Wales, incorporated the stag and oak in a circular form similar to that used by the Royal Berkshire Regiment. This feature is also part of the crests of a number of Berkshire organisations, such as Reading R.F.C., the Berkshire and Buckinghamshire Football Association, the Berkshire Cricket Board, the Berkshire Federation of Women's Institutes, and the Royal County of Berkshire Bowling Association. The blue and white bands are also from the county arms, but may also be inspired by the River Thames and the chalk hills of the Berkshire Downs, or the colours used by Berkshire archers during the Battle of Agincourt. They may also reflect the horizontal hoops of Reading Football Club's home kit.

A later proposal, created by Michael Garber, retained the locally-meaningful colours and symbols featured in the original design by Nash Ford. The Nash Ford design was deemed unsuitable as a flag because the gold charge on white breaks the rule of tincture, by which two lighter colours do not contrast well and thus the gold charge loses visibility from any distance. It has also been deemed as confusing because the curved form of the oak tree which resembles a letter "C", thereby leads some people to think it represents a county name also beginning with "C". The Garber proposal thus aims to retain all the design criteria of the original proposal in a more effective arrangement and was completed after extensive consultation with the Flag Institute.

Banner of the arms of the former Berkshire County Council

David Nash proposal

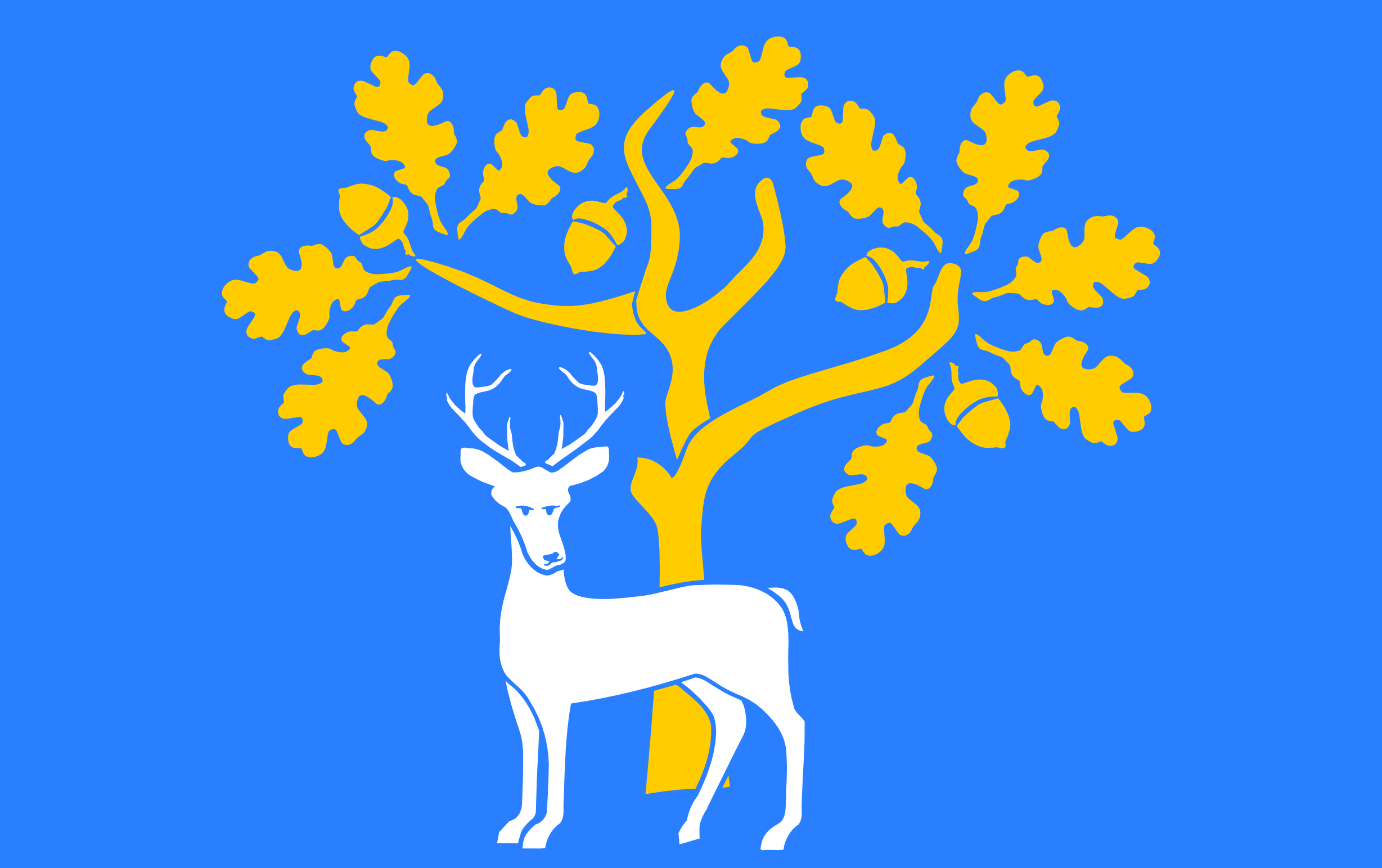
Michael Garber proposal
