= Flag of Herefordshire =

Flag of English county

- Proportion: 3:5
- Adopted: 2 November 2019
- Designed by: Jason Saber

The Herefordshire flag is flag of the English county of Herefordshire. It was registered with the Flag Institute on 2 November 2019.

== Design ==
The flag has a charge of a white bull's head, specifically a Hereford bull, on a red field about three wavy lines of alternating white and blue. The red field represents the red earth of Herefordshire and the red fur of Herefordshire cattle. The wavy stripes represent the River Wye.

=== Colours ===
The pantone colours for the flag are:

Scheme	Dark Red	White	Blue	Dark Red
Pantone (paper)	201 C	Safe	300 C	484 C
HEX	#9d2235	#FFFFFF	#005eb8	#9a3324
CMYK	0, 78, 66, 38	0, 0, 0, 0	100, 49, 0, 28	0, 67, 77, 40
RGB	158, 35, 54	255, 255, 255	0, 94, 184	153, 50, 35

== History ==
=== Origin ===
The Herefordshire bull has long been a symbol of the county, and has been used as the insignia for various Herefordshire-based organisations for centuries. The flag is based on the coat of arms awarded to Herefordshire Council in 1946, which used similar wavy lines, but with the bulls head below and a lion rampant above. The waves, referencing the river Wye, are a kind of canting arms referencing the "ford" part of the county's name.

=== 2019 competition ===
Banner of the arms of Herefordshire council

In absence of a registered flag, the banner of arms of Herefordshire Council was sometimes used, with it having been flown alongside the Union Flag above the Department for Communities and Local Government. It features a river running through a red background with a lion passant guardant (sometimes called a "leopard") above and the head of a bull below.

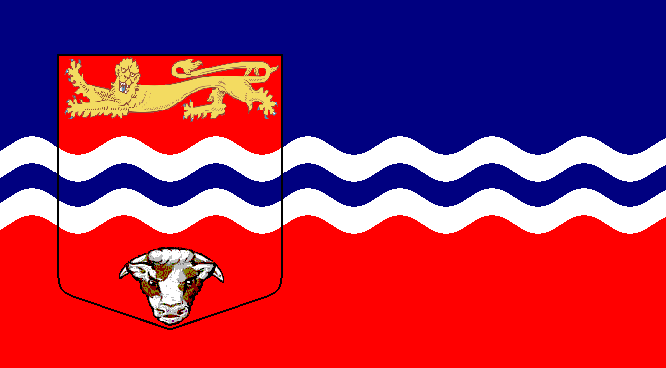
Unofficial Herefordshire flag, which gained popularity after being created by an unnamed university graduate

An alternative design for a flag has been popular, despite being created by a former student as an internet joke, and is sold at the Hereford Tourist Centre.

In January 2019, the Herefordshire Flag Committee, working in conjunction with the council and the Flag Institute, announced plans for an open competition to create a registered flag with a deadline for entries of 15 April. An assessment panel was due to create a shortlist by the end of June and the people of Herefordshire will have then voted in the summer. But due to the high volume of entries, the shortlisting process took longer than they were anticipating and the vote began in early September after the shortlisted entries were revealed. Everyone in the county aged five and over was allowed to vote. The winning design was revealed on 2 November. The finalists were the following designs:

Design A - Hereford bull and apples on a background of the county's red earth.

Design B - The apple surrounded by a design representing Herefordshire's black and white houses.

Design C - Hereford bull, the River Wye and deep red soil. (Winner)

Design D - Hereford bull, the River Wye, apples and hops.

Design E - Herefordshire's rolling hills and apples set against a background of ripening hay.

== See also ==
- Flag of St. Louis
