= Flag of Hampshire =

Flag of English county

Hampshire
- Proportion: 3:5
- Adopted: 12 March 2019; 7 years ago
- Designed by: Jason Saber and Brady Ells
- Proportion: 3:5
- Design: Council flag for formal occasions, with a royal crown
- Proportion: 3:5
- Design: Council flag flown daily

The Hampshire flag is the flag of the English county of Hampshire. It was registered with the Flag Institute on 12 March 2019.

== Design ==
The flag of Hampshire, conceived by Jason Saber and further refined by Brady Ells, retains the rose and crown pattern used in the county for several centuries in various guises. In 1992 the local county council received a formal grant of arms that included a gold royal crown on a red field, over a red rose on a gold field. Wishing to avoid using the restricted royal symbol of the crown on the council flag, Jason Saber replaced the "royal crown" with a specifically Saxon crown. This is also a reference to the county's association with the era of Alfred the Great and his capital of Winchester. Such a crown also appears in the full achievement of arms used by the council, symbolising exactly the same Alfredian legacy as intended in this flag. The red and white double Tudor rose is inspired by the double rose on the “Arthurian” table in the Great Hall in Winchester.

Notably, the bottom sepal of the rose on the Hampshire flag points down, the same way round as the Yorkshire Rose. This represents it being Southampton's shire, in contrast to the rose on the flag of Northamptonshire which points up, the same way as the Lancashire Rose does. However, the Council flags' rose point upwards.

=== Colours ===
The Pantone colours are:

Scheme	Red	Red	Orange	Gold	White	Grey	Green
Pantone (Paper)	485 C	484 C	137 C	116 C	White	422 C	356 C
Web colours	#DA291C	#9A3324	#FFA300	#FFCD00	#FFFFFF	#9EA2A2	#007A33
RGB	218, 41, 28	154, 51, 36	255, 163, 0	255, 205, 0	255, 255, 255	158, 162, 162	0, 122, 51
CMYK	0%, 81%, 87%, 15%	0%, 67%, 77%, 40%	0%, 36%, 100%, 0%	0%, 20%, 100%, 0%	0%, 0%, 0%, 0%	2%, 0%, 0%, 36%	100%, 0%, 58%, 52%

== History ==
Though it is unclear where the rose as a symbol for Hampshire comes from, there are several theories. Popularly, it is said that Henry V granted it for bravery to a Hampshire-based contingent at the Battle of Agincourt. This doesn’t really hold water, however, as there was no such contingent, or indeed any contingent associated with any specific county or region in the battle. Other theories include it being granted by John of Gaunt, or Edmund Crouchback, the latter of whom had property in the county. Henry III used a similar gold rose as a royal badge, borrowed from his wife Eleanor of Provence, and since he was born in Winchester castle, could’ve contributed to the symbols association with the county, as well as Edmund Crouchback having been his son and switching the colour to red to differentiate from Henry’s rose. The Hampshire history website states that a rose and crown appeared on the fourteenth century Statute of the Staple in Southampton.

The flag was officially added to the Flag Institute's registry of flags on 12 March 2019 after receiving support from Hampshire County Council, the Lord Lieutenant of Hampshire, and many local organisations.

As well as the red-yellow bicolour flag flown on formal occasions, the council also flies a blue banner with the council logo as "daily" flag.

The county day is 15 July, which is St Swithin's Day. St Swithin was an Anglo-Saxon bishop of Winchester.
