= Flag of Oxfordshire =

Flag of English county

Oxfordshire
- Proportion: 3:5
- Adopted: 9 October 2017; 9 years ago
- Designed by: College of Arms

The Oxfordshire flag is the flag of the historic county of Oxfordshire in England. It was registered with the Flag Institute on 9 October 2017.

== Design ==
Arms of Oxfordshire County Council, 1949-1976

Arms of Oxfordshire County Council, 1976-Present

Coats of arms of the Oxfordshire County Council, which the flag is based on

The flag originates as the coat of arms of the former County Council of Oxfordshire and was created in 1949. Following reorganisation of local government in 1974, the arms ceased to be used by any organisation but the design was later adapted as a flag and widely used across the county. The basic field colour is the dark blue long associated with the University of Oxford; against this two broad, white, wavy stripes symbolise the River Thames, and against this sits a red ox head, the combination of which alludes to the origin of the county town of Oxford. At the lower left and upper right corners, a golden oak tree and wheatsheaf or garb represent the county's woodland and agriculture.

== Previous proposals ==
=== St Frideswide Cross ===
A previous proposal for county flag was called the St Frideswide Cross, honouring a local saint. The green background represents the fields and woodlands of the county; the blue symbolises the River Thames. It was designed by Edward Keene and Michael Garber of the Oxfordshire Association, in conjunction with the Flag Institute's Graham Bartram. In March 2011, the standard was flown for a week alongside the Union Flag outside the Eland House headquarters in Victoria of the Department for Communities and Local Government.

=== Armorial banner ===
An alternative commercially available flag exists, based on a banner of the coat of arms of the Oxfordshire County Council.

=== Gallery ===
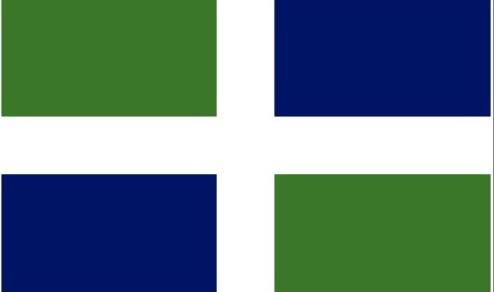
St Frideswide Cross

Banner of the County Council coat of arms
