= Flag of Somerset =

Flag of English county

Somerset
- Proportion: 3:5
- Adopted: July 2013
- Design: Or, a Dragon Rampant Gules
- Designed by: Ed Woods

The flag of Somerset is the flag of the English county of Somerset. A campaign had been running between 2006 and 2009 in support of a flag and subsequently the Association of British Counties had taken up the campaign. The Lord Lieutenant of Somerset, Elizabeth, Lady Gass, had shown her support as had David Heath MP and the local TV, radio and newspapers. The flag was adopted following a competition in July 2013. This symbol was mentioned in the book "The Once and Future King" by T. H. White, and is said to have been worn by Arthur during the first joust of Lancelot and Arthur.

== History ==
Late in 2005, enquiries were made as to the potential usage of Somerset County Council's logo as a flag of the county either in its current form or in a modified form without the mace (the symbol of the Council's authority). The response was that the people of Somerset could fly the Council's flag to show their support for both their council and county. This reaffirmed the position that the logo is the property of Somerset County Council and not the county at large. Strong support for a flag subsequently came from David Heath, Lady Gass, as well as coverage from the Western Daily Press, Somerset County Gazette, and BBC Somerset in addition to Orchard FM and Ivel FM.

In 2006, resident Ed Woods set up a website proposing a flag for the county. This version entailed a red wyvern on a yellow background with no mace. However, as of December 2009, the website ceased and the campaign was taken over by the Association of British Counties as part of a wider effort to recognise more county flags.

Early in 2013, the Somerset County Gazette reported that local law firm Pardoes had begun flying the county flag from their premises in Taunton. This prompted a response from long time Somerset campaigner Adam Thomas. In his letter, he pointed out the Somerset did not have a county flag, and that the one being flown was in fact the flag of Somerset County Council. As a direct result of this in May 2013, the Somerset County Gazette together with Pardoes, announced a county-wide competition for residents to design a new flag for Somerset, which was subsequently won by the design submitted by Ed Woods.

=== 2013 competition finalists ===
Winner

Joint second place

Joint second place

Third place

=== Naming of the dragon ===
On Somerset Day 2026, it was announced that the dragon had been given a name, as voted for by the listeners of BBC Radio Somerset. The competition was won by Gaby Stocker from Tatworth. The dragon shall now be known as Dunkery.

== Somerset County Council Armorial Banner ==
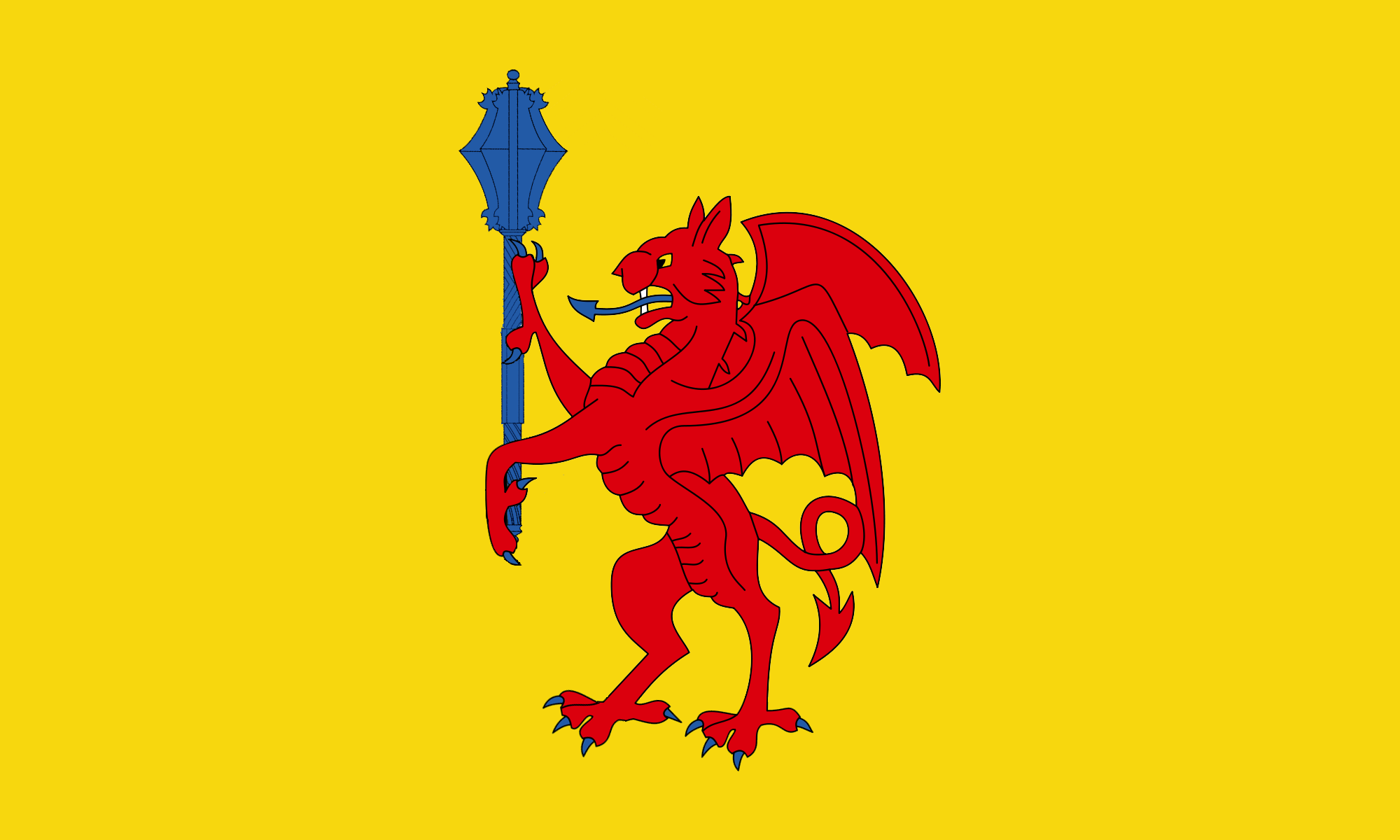
Somerset Council Armorial Banner

Commercial version

Somerset County Council was awarded its coat of arms by the College of Heralds in 1911. The blazon or heraldic description of Somerset County Council's coat of arms is "Or, a Dragon Rampant Gules holding in the claws a Mace erect Azure", meaning a red upright dragon on a gold background holding an upright blue mace. It has superficial similarities to the gold wyvern on a red background traditionally associated with Wessex (of which Somerset was part). With local government reorganisations, Somerset County Council no longer controls the whole of Somerset. This means that the coat of arms not only do not represent the whole county, but are not for public use. The logo that is based on the coat of arms is available for sale, but technically as it bears the mace it still represents the County Council. A commercial version of this armorial banner still currently exists, on a white background with 'Somerset' stenciled on the top of the flag.
