= Flag Institute =

Charitable organisation

- Flag of the Flag Institute since 2016
- Formation: 23 April 1971; 55 years ago
- Founder: William Crampton
- Type: Charitable incorporated organisation
- Registration no.: 1152496
- Purpose: Vexillology
- Location: London, England
- President: Malcolm Farrow
- Key people: John Hall (Chairman)
- Website: www.flaginstitute.org

The Flag Institute is a membership organisation and UK-registered educational charity devoted to the study and promotion of flags and flag flying. It documents flags in the UK and around the world, maintains a UK Flag Registry, and offers advice and guidance about flags and their design and usage. It is often consulted on these matters but holds no official status or authority.

== History and role ==
Original flag of the Flag Institute, used from 1971 to 2016

The Flag Institute was formed from the Flag Section of The Heraldry Society on St George's Day, 23 April 1971, by William Crampton, later president of FIAV, with E.M.C. Barraclough as its chairman. It is a membership-based vexillological organisation with over 400 members from all parts of the world, an adviser to the UK Parliamentary Flags and Heraldry Committee, and the provider of advice and information to individuals and organisations including UK Government departments, the BBC, ITN, and many publishers, museums and libraries.

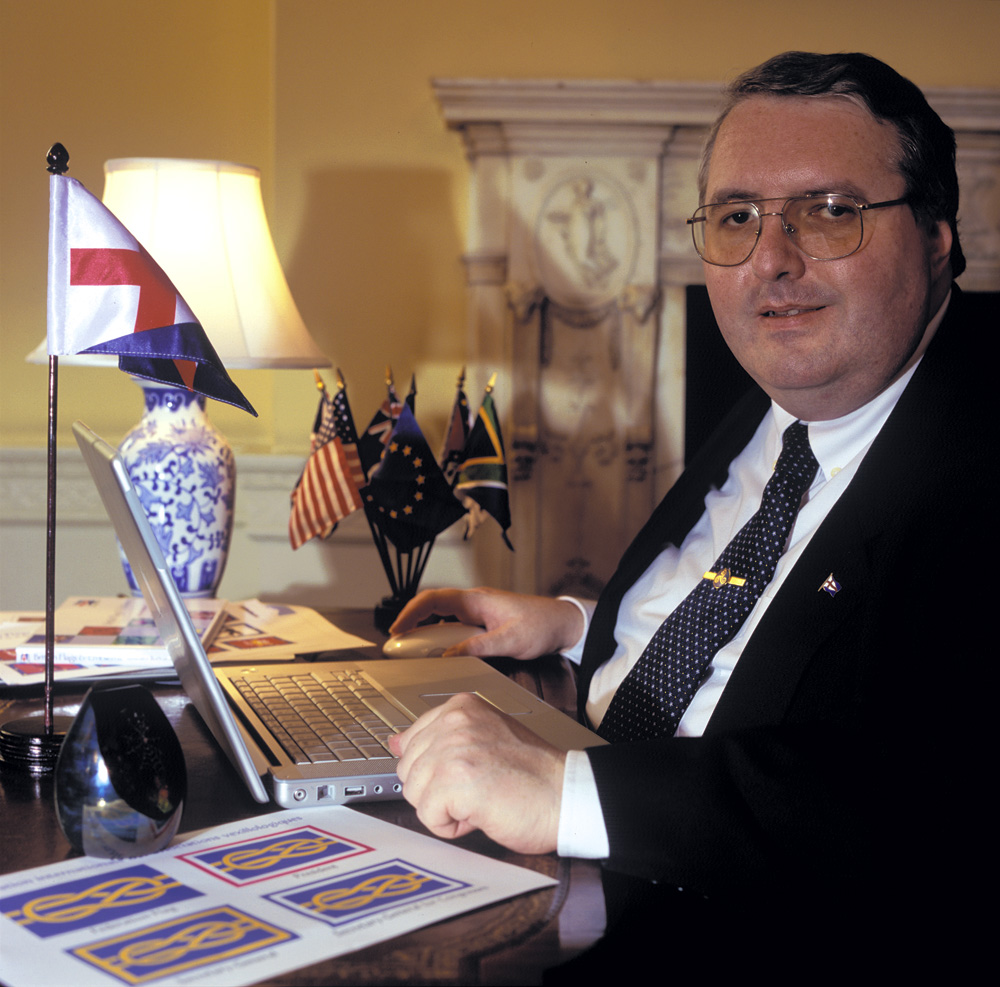
Graham Bartram. Chief Vexillologist and Trustee of the Flag Institute

The Flag Institute became a charity in 2013, following a postal vote of its members, and is governed by a board of five elected Trustees, who are advised by the President and a number of appointed Officers. It maintains the William Crampton Library, named in honour of its co-founder, and publishes a bi-annual journal, Flagmaster. It holds twice-yearly Conferences, open to members and non-members, in locations around the UK or on Zoom.

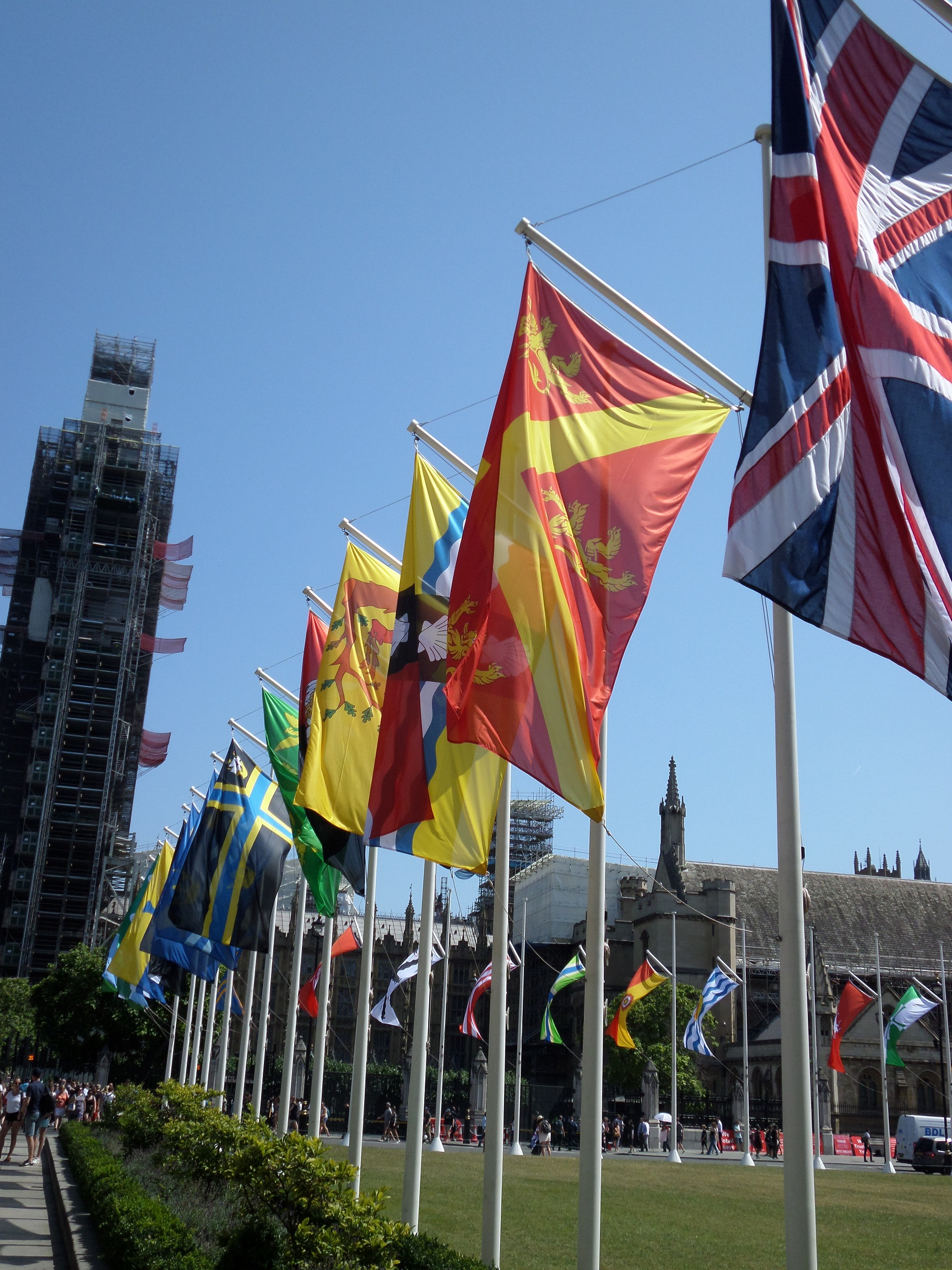
County flags in Parliament Square in 2019

In 2010 the Flag Institute and the UK Parliamentary Flags and Heraldry Committee campaigned successfully to ensure that the national flag of the United Kingdom would fly permanently from the flagpole of the Houses of Parliament. Previously the Union Flag had flown only when Parliament was in session, leaving the flagpole bare at other times.

== UK Flag Registry ==
The Flag Institute maintains and manages a UK Flag Registry recording the national, supranational, local and community flags flown in the UK and its Crown Dependencies and Overseas Territories.

Its officers have also been involved in several flag designs, including those for the badge and ensign of the UK Border Agency and the flag of the UK Supreme Court.

All Scottish flags must, by law, be authorised by Lord Lyon and recorded in the 'Public Register of All Arms and Bearings in Scotland' and he appointed the Flag Institute's Philip Tibbetts to the newly created role of Honorary Vexillologist to the Court of the Lord Lyon. The Earl Marshal and the College of Arms are legally responsible for flags in the rest of the UK. Both the College of Arms and the Court of Lord Lyon maintain the official register of flags for their respective country or countries. Flags and symbols relating to the UK Armed Forces are regulated by the Crown through the Ministry of Defence, which also governs flags flown at sea by British-registered vessels.

== Publications ==
In 2010 the Flag Institute, with the Parliamentary Flags and Heraldry Committee, published a guide to Britain's flag protocol, Flying Flags in the United Kingdom. A revised edition was published in 2020.
