= List of United Kingdom flags =

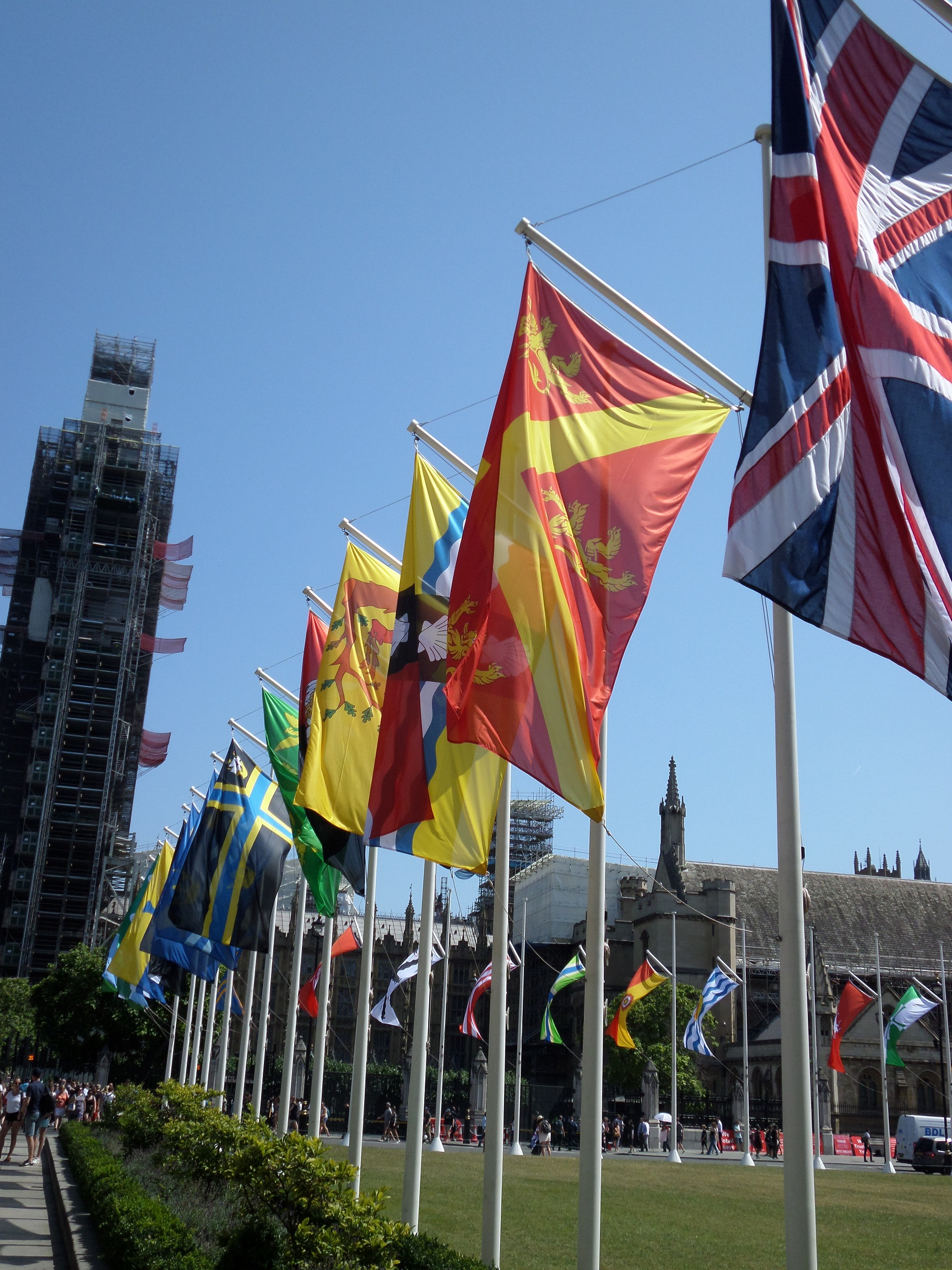
Union Flag and County flags flying in Parliament Square, London

This list includes flags that either have been in use or are currently used by the United Kingdom, the individual countries of the United Kingdom, the British Overseas Territories and the Crown Dependencies.

The College of Arms is the authority on the flying of flags in England, Wales and Northern Ireland and maintains the only official register of flags for these countries. It was established in 1484 and as part of the Royal Household operates under the authority of the Crown. The Lord Lyon King of Arms, established prior to 1399, holds a similar role within Scotland. A separate private body called the Flag Institute, an educational charity financed by its own membership, also maintains a registry of United Kingdom flags that it styles 'the UK Flag Registry', though this has no official status under British law.

== Flags recognised by planning law ==
Certain classes of flag enjoy a special status within English planning law and can be flown without needing the planning permission normally required for advertisements. These include any country’s national flag, civil ensign or civil air ensign; the flag of the Commonwealth, the United Nations or any other international organisation of which the United Kingdom is a member; a flag of any island, county, district, borough, burgh, parish, city, town or village within the United Kingdom; the flag of the Black Country, East Anglia, Wessex, any Part of Lincolnshire, any Riding of Yorkshire or any historic county within the United Kingdom; the flag of St David; the flag of St Patrick; the flag of any administrative area within any country outside the United Kingdom; any flag of the British Armed Forces; and the Armed Forces Day flag.

Since the United Kingdom left the European Union, flying the flag of the European Union now requires planning permission. However the United Kingdom remains a member of the Council of Europe, which uses the same flag.

Certain other flags may be flown without obtaining planning permission, providing they adhere to certain restrictions including location, size, and number of flags. These include "house flags" for companies or individuals occupying a building, or temporary events taking place in a building; sports club flags (excluding sponsorship logos); the rainbow flag; flags of certain award schemes (Eco-Schools, The King's Awards for Enterprise, Investors in People, Blue Flag Award for beaches, and Green Flag Award for parks and open spaces); and NHS flags.

== Current national flags ==
National and subnational flags of the United Kingdom.

=== United Kingdom ===
Flag	Date	Use	Description	Status
	1801–present	The Union Flag, also commonly known as the Union Jack. Used as the flag of the United Kingdom	A superimposition of the flags of England and Scotland with the Saint Patrick's Saltire (representing the Kingdom of Ireland).	National flag used by government and civilian population with the aspect ratios of either 1:2 or 3:5. A 1:2 ratio is the most common.
	1801–present	The Union Flag, also commonly known as the Union Jack. Used as the flag of the United Kingdom	A superimposition of the flags of England and Scotland with the Saint Patrick's Saltire (representing the Kingdom of Ireland).	Vertical national flag used by government and civilian population.

==== Countries of the United Kingdom ====
Flag	Date	Use	Description	Status
	c. 1348	Flag of England, also known as the St George's Cross	A red cross on a white field. (Argent a cross Gules)	National flag of England also used by the Church of England, sports teams representing England and ordinary citizens.
	1924–1972 unofficial since 1972	Flag of Northern Ireland, also known as the Ulster Banner	A red cross on a white field; in the centre, a crowned six-pointed star bearing the Red Hand of Ulster. (Argent a cross gules, overall on a six-pointed star of the field ensigned by an Imperial crown proper a Dexter hand couped at the wrist of the second)	Northern Ireland has no official nor universally accepted flag. The Ulster Banner portrayed here was the flag of the Government of Northern Ireland between 1953 and 1972. Since 1972 this flag has continued to be used for want of another distinctive flag, almost exclusively amongst the Unionist community. The flag is commonly used for sporting events and teams from Northern Ireland, most notably in the Commonwealth Games, the Northern Ireland national football team and events where Northern Irish competitors represent the province specifically such as snooker, darts and golf.
	c. 1542 (variants first appeared c. 1286)	Flag of Scotland, also known as the St Andrew's Cross, or the Saltire	A diagonal white cross on a blue field. (Azure a saltire Argent)	National flag used by Scottish Government and agencies, sports teams representing Scotland and by ordinary citizens.
	c. 1807 (variants first appeared c. 1485)	Flag of Wales, also known as the Red Dragon or Y Ddraig Goch	A Welsh Dragon on a horizontal bicolour of white over green. (Per fess Argent and Vert, a dragon passant Gules)	National flag used by the Welsh Government and agencies, sports teams representing Wales and by ordinary citizens.

The flags of England and of Scotland are ancient war flags which became by usage the national flags of the Kingdom of England (which included Wales) and of the Kingdom of Scotland respectively and continued in use until the Act of Union 1707. Thereafter, they were as de facto flags of those parts of the United Kingdom. The flag of Wales was formalised in 1959, but has ancient origins; the dragon was used as a battle-flag by countless Welsh rulers, the current flag being a redesign of the flag carried by Henry Tudor. The Flag of Northern Ireland is controversial. The coat of arms of the Government of Northern Ireland, a red cross on a white field, defaced with a Red Hand of Ulster within a six pointed star topped with a crown, became used as a local flag, though the end of the province's Government in 1973 ended its official status. This flag has continued to be the internationally recognisable de facto flag of Northern Ireland through its use by international sporting organisations (for example FIFA, UEFA, and the Commonwealth Games) to represent Northern Ireland, though locally it has the allegiance mainly of the Unionist community. The St Patrick's Saltire is also sometimes used by the UK government in London to represent Northern Ireland when a discrete Northern Ireland flag is required.

== Crown Dependencies ==
Flag	Date	Use	Description
	1993–present	Flag of Alderney	A red cross on a white field (St George's Cross) with an inescutcheon of the island's coat of arms. Alderney is an autonomous Crown Dependency and is part of the Bailiwick of Guernsey.
		Government ensign of Alderney	A Blue Ensign with the arms of Alderney.
	1936–1985	Flag of Guernsey	A red cross on a white field (St George's Cross).
	1985–present	Flag of Guernsey	A golden cross within a red cross on a white field (St George's Cross). Guernsey is an autonomous Crown Dependency and is part of the Bailiwick of Guernsey.
	1985–present	Civil ensign of Guernsey	A Red Ensign with a gold cross.
	1985–present	State ensign of Guernsey	A Blue Ensign with a gold cross.
	c.1950–1953	Flag of Herm	A dark blue field with the arms of Guernsey in the hoist and the words "HERM ISLAND" beneath it.
	c.1953–present	Flag of Herm	A red cross on a white field (St George's Cross) with the coat of arms of the island in the canton. Herm is an island which belongs to the Bailiwick of Guernsey.
	1931–present	Flag of the Isle of Man	A triskelion on a red field.
	1971–present	Civil ensign of the Isle of Man	A Red Ensign with a triskelion.
	before 1981	Flag of Jersey	A red saltire on a white field.
	1981–present	Flag of Jersey	A red saltire on a white field defaced with the island's badge.
	2010–present	Civil ensign of Jersey	A Red Ensign with a crowned coat of arms of Jersey in the hoist.
	1907–present	Government ensign of Jersey	A Blue Ensign with the arms of Jersey.
	2010–present	Storm flag of Jersey	A long white pennant with a red border along the top and bottom, and a crowned coat of arms of Jersey in the hoist.
	2019–present	Flag of Lihou	A green flag with a white stripe in the hoist, with the name "The Lihou Charitable Trust" in white on the green field, and a black and white Eurasian oystercatcher flying eastwards on the white stripe.
	1938–2020	Flag of Sark	A red cross on a white field (St George's Cross) with two lions (the arms of the Plantagenet Dukes of Normandy) in the canton overflowing the red cross. Strictly speaking, this was the personal flag of the Seigneur.
	2020–present	Flag of Sark	A red cross on a white field (St George's Cross) with two lions (the arms of the Plantagenet Dukes of Normandy) in the canton. Strictly speaking, this was the personal flag of the Seigneur. Sark is an autonomous Crown Dependency and is part of the Bailiwick of Guernsey.

=== Parishes of Guernsey ===
Flag	Date	Use	Description
		Flag of Castel	
		Flag of Forest	A white flag defaced in the centre with a dark green shield containing a gold Shield of the Trinity.
		Flag of Saint Andrew	
		Flag of Saint Martin	
		Flag of Saint Peter Port	A white flag with the shield of the parish in the centre, consisting of the coat of arms of Guernsey surrounded by a blue and silver ring bearing the name "ST PIERRE PORT GUERNSEY".
		Flag of Saint Pierre du Bois	A flag coloured two-thirds dark blue and one-third light blue (at the top), with a brown and green tree in the light blue section and a pair of crossed gold and silver keys (the Keys of Heaven) in the dark blue section.
		Flag of Saint Sampson	
		Flag of Saint Saviour	
		Flag of Torteval	A white flag with a red field in the canton containing a gold Norman cross. At the bottom of the flag are three blue waves, with a red ship with four white sails sailing eastwards on the top wave. Below the ship is a gold scroll bearing the name "TORTEVAL", and behind the ship is a green shoreline, above which a grey gull is flying downwards. Above the gull is a grey skyline.
		Flag of Vale	

=== Parishes of Jersey ===
Flag	Date	Use	Description
		Flag of Grouville	A white flag with a shield in the centre containing eight horizontal stripes of white and red.
		Flag of Saint Brelade	A silver fish on a blue field.
		Flag of Saint Clement	A golden anchor on a blue field.
		Flag of Saint Helier	Two crossed gold axes on a blue field.
		Flag of Saint John	A silver Maltese cross on a green field.
		Flag of Saint Lawrence	A black gridiron on a white field.
		Flag of Saint Martin	A red flag with a shield in the centre containing seven horizontal stripes of white and red (four white and three red).
		Flag of Saint Mary	A silver fleur-de-lis on a blue field.
		Flag of Saint Ouen	A gold Latin cross on a blue field.
		Flag of Saint Peter	Two crossed silver keys (the Keys of Heaven) on a red field.
		Flag of Saint Saviour	Three golden Holy Nails surrounded by a golden crown of thorns on a red field.
		Flag of Trinity	A silver and gold Shield of the Trinity with black text on a green field.

== British Overseas Territories ==
In 1999, the maritime flags of the British Overseas Territories were updated at the request of the Ministry of Defence. The white discs were removed from the field of the flags and each respective coat of arms was increased in size for ease of identification. As the MoD only had authority over sea flags, the governments of the Overseas Territories were free to continue using the flags with white discs on land. The Overseas Territories' governments did switch to the updated flags over a staggered period of time, however some old-style flags with white discs may still be seen. Such flags have generally been adopted by Order in Council. Civil (Red Ensign) flags are under the control of the United Kingdom Secretary of State for Transport and are split into two categories: Category 1 is to register ships of unlimited tonnage and type. Category 2 is to register commercial ships and yachts of up to 150 gross registered tons.

Flag	Date	Use	Description
	1990–present	Anguilla	A Blue Ensign defaced with the coat of arms of Anguilla.
	1960–present	Flag used in Akrotiri and Dhekelia	The Union Jack is used as no territory flag exists.
	2013–present	Ascension Island, a constituent part of Saint Helena, Ascension and Tristan da Cunha	A Blue Ensign defaced with the coat of arms of Ascension Island.
	1999–present	Bermuda	A Blue Ensign defaced with the coat of arms of Bermuda. Used as the government ensign.
	1999–present	Bermuda	A Red Ensign defaced with the coat of arms of Bermuda. Used on land and as the civil ensign.
	1963–present	British Antarctic Territory	A White Ensign less the cross of St George defaced with the coat of arms of the British Antarctic Territory
	1963–present	British Antarctic Territory	A Blue Ensign defaced with the coat of arms of the British Antarctic Territory
	1990–present	British Indian Ocean Territory	A Blue Ensign with white wavy lines, defaced with the coat of arms of the British Indian Ocean Territory.
	1960–present	British Virgin Islands	A Blue Ensign defaced with the coat of arms of the British Virgin Islands. Used on land and as the government ensign.
	1960–present	British Virgin Islands	A Red Ensign defaced with the coat of arms of the British Virgin Islands. Used on land and as the civil ensign.
	1999–present	Cayman Islands	A Blue Ensign defaced with the coat of arms of the Cayman Islands. Used on land and as the government ensign.
	1999–present	Cayman Islands	A Red Ensign defaced with the coat of arms of the Cayman Islands. Used on land and as the civil ensign.
	1999–present	Falkland Islands	A Blue Ensign defaced with the coat of arms of the Falkland Islands. Used on land and as the government ensign.
	1999–present	Falkland Islands	A Red Ensign defaced with the coat of arms of the Falkland Islands. Used on land and as the civil ensign.
	1982–present	Gibraltar	Two horizontal bands of white (top, double width) and red with a three-towered red castle in the centre of the white band; hanging from the castle gate is a gold key centred in the red band. This is the flag commonly used on land.
	1999–present	Gibraltar	A Blue Ensign defaced with the badge of Gibraltar in the fly. This is the ensign for vessels owned by the Government, or in Government service.
	1996–present	Gibraltar	A Red Ensign defaced with the badge of Gibraltar in the fly. Used as the civil ensign for locally registered vessel.
	1999–present	Montserrat	A Blue Ensign defaced with the coat of arms of Montserrat.
	1984–present	Pitcairn Islands	A Blue Ensign defaced with the coat of arms of the Pitcairn Islands.
	1984–present	Saint Helena, a constituent part of Saint Helena, Ascension and Tristan da Cunha	A Blue Ensign defaced with the coat of arms of Saint Helena.
	1985–present	South Georgia and the South Sandwich Islands	A Blue Ensign defaced with the coat of arms of South Georgia and the South Sandwich Islands.
	2002–present	Tristan da Cunha, a constituent part of Saint Helena, Ascension and Tristan da Cunha	A Blue Ensign defaced with the coat of arms of Tristan da Cunha.
	1968–present	Turks and Caicos Islands	A Blue Ensign defaced with the coat of arms of the Turks and Caicos Islands.
	1968–present	Turks and Caicos Islands	A Red Ensign defaced with the coat of arms of the Turks and Caicos Islands.

=== Governors' flags ===
Prior to 1999, all governors' flags had smaller discs and the outer green garland without the gold ring. Therefore, the dates given do not reflect this minor, consistent change.

Flag	Date	Use	Description
	1990–present	Personal flag of the governor of Anguilla	A Union Jack defaced with the coat of arms of Anguilla
	Before 2011	Personal flag of the governor of Bermuda	A Union Jack defaced with the coat of arms of Bermuda
	1962–present	Personal flag of the commissioner of the British Antarctic Territory	A Union Jack defaced with the coat of arms of the British Antarctic Territory
	1990–present	Flag of the commissioner of the British Indian Ocean Territory	A design based on the Blue Ensign with a Union Jack in the union and wavy white lines going horizontally along the field, defaced with the coat of arms of the British Indian Ocean Territory. This flag is also used as the de facto flag of the Territory.
	1971–present	Personal flag of the governor of the British Virgin Islands	A Union Jack defaced with the coat of arms of the British Virgin Islands
	1971–present	Personal flag of the governor of the Cayman Islands	A Union Jack defaced with the coat of arms of the Cayman Islands
	1948–present	Personal flag of the governor of the Falkland Islands	A Union Jack defaced with the coat of arms of the Falkland Islands
	Before 2011	Personal flag of the governor of Gibraltar	A Union Jack defaced with the coat of arms of Gibraltar
	Before 2011	Personal flag of the governor of Montserrat	A Union Jack defaced with the coat of arms of Montserrat
	Before 2011	Personal flag of the governor of Saint Helena	A Union Flag defaced with the coat of arms of Saint Helena
	1999–present	Personal flag of the commissioner for South Georgia and the South Sandwich Islands	A Union Jack defaced with the coat of arms of South Georgia and the South Sandwich Islands
	2002–present	Personal flag of the governor of Tristan da Cunha, also used by the Administrator of Tristan da Cunha	A Union Jack defaced with the coat of arms of Tristan da Cunha.
	Before 2011	Personal flag of the governor of the Turks and Caicos Islands	A Union Jack defaced with the coat of arms of the Turks and Caicos Islands

=== Municipal flags ===
Flag	Date	Use	Description
		Flag of Hamilton, Bermuda	
		Flag of St. George's, Bermuda	

== Ensigns ==
Flag	Date	Use	Description
	1801–present	Blue Ensign, used by some organisations or territories associated with the UK and also used by Royal Navy Reserve (not for some time) Captain of Merchant Navy Ship – e.g., RMS Queen Mary	A blue field, with a Union Jack in the canton
	1864–present	Government Service Ensign (previously the Transport Ensign or Admiralty Ensign)	A Blue Ensign defaced with a horizontal yellow anchor
	2025	Scottish Government Marine Directorate ensign	A Blue Ensign defaced with the badge showing an anchor and the letters M and D, surrounded by a wreath of thistles, all beneath the Crown of Scotland
	1801–present	Red Ensign, used by the Merchant Navy	A red field, with a Union Jack in the canton
	1801–present	Civil Jack	A Union Jack with a white border
		The Ensign of Trinity House	Red Ensign defaced with the shield of the coat of arms (a St George's Cross with a sailing ship in each quarter). The Master and Deputy Master each have their own flags.
		Royal National Lifeboat Institution	
	1994–present	Maritime Volunteer Service	
		Company of Watermen and Lightermen	
		Ensign of the Commissioners of Irish Lights, used by CIL vessels in Northern Ireland	The Blue Ensign defaced with the commissioners' badge in the fly.
	2006–present	Ship of the National Historic Fleet	
	2006–present	Registered vessel of the National Historic Ships UK	
	1931–present	Civil air ensign, used by civilian aircraft and at civil airports	A white-edged blue cross on a light blue field with the Union Jack in the canton.
		Dunkirk Jack, used by Member Ships of the Association of Dunkirk Little Ships, which consists of civilian vessels that participated in the Dunkirk evacuation.	The Cross of Saint George defaced with the arms of Dunkirk.
		Unofficial Cornish ensign (or St Piran's Ensign)	The Cornish flag defaced with a Union flag in the canton.
	2000–present	Another unofficial Cornish ensign flown by the ship Sweet Promise during the 'Brest 2000' festival.	The Cornish flag defaced with the Standard of the Duke of Cornwall in the canton.
	2003–present	Unofficial Devon Ensign (or St Petroc's Ensign)	The Devon flag defaced with a Union flag in the canton.
	2023–present	Unofficial Warwickshire ensign found within Etone College	St. George's Cross defaced with a Bear and Ragged Staff in the canton.

=== Naval Service ===
Flag	Date	Use	Description
	1801–present	White Ensign, Royal Navy, usually ships bearing the prefix HMS (but see blue ensign), and the Royal Yacht Squadron	A red cross on a white field with the Union Jack in the canton
	1968–present	Ensign of the Royal Fleet Auxiliary	A Blue Ensign defaced with a vertical yellow anchor
	1974–2008	Ensign of the Royal Maritime Auxiliary Service	A Blue Ensign defaced with a horizontal yellow anchor with two wavy yellow lines beneath
	1963–present	Ensign of the Royal Naval Auxiliary Service	A Blue Ensign defaced with the shield of the Royal Naval Auxiliary Service
		Combined Cadet Force Naval Section Ensign	RNR Blue Ensign with CCF Naval Section badge
	1942–present	Sea Cadet Corps Ensign	RNR Blue Ensign with SCC badge
		Flag of the Lord High Admiral of the United Kingdom	A fouled anchor on a crimson background.
		Flag of the Corps of His Majesty's Royal Marines	A dark blue field with unequal horizontal yellow, green, and red stripes, and the crest of the Royal Marines.
		Flag of the Commandant General Royal Marines	A dark blue field with a fouled anchor, lion, and crown.
		King's Colour for the Royal Navy	A White Ensign defaced in the centre of the cross with a garter of the Order of the Garter encircling the Royal Cypher of King Charles III and surmounted by a Tudor Crown.

=== Army ===
Flag	Date	Use	Description
		Non-ceremonial flag of the British Army	A red field defaced with the badge of the British Army.
	1838–present	Ensign of the Corps of Royal Engineers	A blue government ensign defaced with the crest of the coat of arms of the Board of Ordnance.
	1952–2022	Camp flag of the Royal Engineers	
	2022–present	Camp flag of the Royal Engineers	
		Ensign of the Royal Logistic Corps for use on vessels commanded by a commissioned officer.	A blue government ensign defaced with the British Army badge of a crown and lion in front of crossed swords.
		Ensign of the Royal Logistic Corps for use on vessels under command of a non-commissioned officer.	A blue government ensign defaced by British Army crossed swords.

=== Air Force ===
Flag	Date	Use	Description
	1921–present	Royal Air Force Ensign	An RAF light blue field with the Royal Air Force roundel in the fly with a Union Jack in the canton
	1945–1996	Royal Observer Corps Ensign	RAF Ensign with RAF roundel replaced by ROC badge
		Air Training Corps Ensign	RAF Ensign with RAF roundel replaced by ATC badge
		King's Colour for the Royal Air Force	An RAF light blue field with the Union Jack in the canton. In the centre a golden cypher of King Charles III topped by a crown in natural colours, in the lower fly-end the roundel of the RAF. The edge fringed in silver and blue.
	1966–1996	Royal Banner of the Royal Observer Corps	An RAF light blue field with the golden cypher of Elizabeth II, topped by the St Edward’s Crown in natural colours, in the canton. In the centre the badge of the ROC showing the Tudor Crown version. The edge fringed in silver and blue.

=== Combined Forces ===
Flag	Date	Use	Description
	1956–present	Flag of the Joint Services	A dark blue, red, and light blue vertical tricolour defaced with the Joint Service badge. A simplified version with the badge in black is also in use. The tricolour is a combination of the colours of the Armed Forces.
		Flag of the Secretary of State for Defence	A dark blue, red, and light blue horizontal tricolour defaced with a crown and lion. The tricolour is a combination of the colours of the Armed Forces.
	1965–present	Flag of the Chief of the Defence Staff	A dark blue, red, and light blue horizontal tricolour with a Union canton and defaced with the badge of the Chief of the Defence Staff. The tricolour is a combination of the colours of the Armed Forces.
	1971–present	Ensign of the Ministry of Defence Police	A Blue Ensign defaced with the badge of the Ministry of Defence Police.
	1948–present	Standard of the Combined Cadet Force	A green banner defaced with a tricoloured roundel: the crowns of the three services on their associated colour, surrounded by the words "Combined Cadet Force".

=== Yacht club ensigns and burgees ===
Flag	Burgee	Use	Description
		Ensign of the Royal Yacht Squadron	The same as the Naval ensign of the United Kingdom.
		Ensign of the Royal Naval Sailing Association	Blue Ensign.
		Ensign of the Royal Naval Volunteer Reserve Yacht Club	Blue Ensign.
		Ensign of the Royal Engineers Yacht Club	Blue Ensign.
		Ensign of the Royal Cinque Ports Yacht Club	Blue Ensign.
		Ensign of the Royal Gourock Yacht Club	Blue Ensign.
		Ensign of the Royal Southern Yacht Club	Blue Ensign.
		Ensign of the Royal Northern and Clyde Yacht Club	Blue Ensign.
		Ensign of the Royal Thames Yacht Club	Blue Ensign.
		Burgee of the Sussex Motor Yacht Club	Blue Ensign.
		Ensign of the Royal Anglesey Yacht Club	The Blue Ensign defaced with a crown in the middle of the Union Jack.
		Ensign of the Royal Southampton Yacht Club	The Blue Ensign defaced with a crown in the middle of the Union Jack.
		Ensign of the Royal Torbay Yacht Club	The Blue Ensign defaced with a crown in the middle of the Union Jack.
		Ensign of the Bar Yacht Club	Blue Ensign, defaced with the badge of the Bar Yacht Club.
		Ensign of the HMS Conway Cruising Association	Blue Ensign, defaced with the Conway Castle Badge.
		Ensign of the Little Ship Club	Blue Ensign, defaced with the LSC Emblem.
		Ensign of the Poole Yacht Club	The Blue Ensign defaced with the emblem of Poole Yacht Club.
		Ensign of the Portsmouth Yacht Club	The Blue Ensign defaced with the emblem of Portsmouth Yacht Club.
		Ensign of the Royal Channel Islands Yacht Club	The Blue Ensign defaced with the coat of arms of Jersey.
		Ensign of the Royal Corinthian Yacht Club	The Blue Ensign defaced with the emblem of Royal Corinthian Yacht Club.
		Ensign of the Royal Cornwall Yacht Club	Blue Ensign, defaced with the Prince of Wales's feathers heraldic badge.
		Ensign of the Royal Forth Yacht Club	The Blue Ensign defaced by a cross pattée, surmounted by the Crown of Scotland.
		Ensign of the Royal Gibraltar Yacht Club	The Blue Ensign defaced with the coat of arms of Gibraltar.
		Ensign of the Royal Harwich Yacht Club	The Blue Ensign defaced with a yellow rampant lion.
		Ensign of the House of Lords Yacht Club	The Blue Ensign defaced with a yellow crown above an anchor.
		Ensign of the Royal London Yacht Club	The Blue Ensign defaced with the arms of the City of London.
		Ensign of the Royal North of Ireland Yacht Club	The Blue Ensign defaced in the fly with a yellow shamrock surmounted by a Saint Edward's Crown.
		Ensign of the Royal Plymouth Corinthian Yacht Club	The Blue Ensign defaced with the coat of the arms of the Royal Plymouth Corinthian Yacht Club.
		Ensign of the Royal Ulster Yacht Club	The Blue Ensign defaced with the Red Hand of Ulster and St Edward's Crown.
		Ensign of the Royal Yorkshire Yacht Club	The Blue Ensign defaced in the fly with the White Rose of York surmounted by a Saint Edward's Crown.
		Ensign of the Medway Yacht Club	The Blue Ensign defaced with the emblem of Medway Yacht Club.
		Ensign of the Old Worcesters Yacht Club	The Blue Ensign defaced with the emblem of Old Worcesters Yacht Club.
		Ensign of the Sussex Yacht Club	The Blue Ensign defaced with the emblem of Sussex Yacht Club.
		Ensign of the House of Commons Yacht Club	
		Ensign of the Royal Dart Yacht Club	The Red Ensign defaced with a Royal Crown and an arrow pointed towards the hoist under the crown.
		Ensign of the Royal Fowey Yacht Club	The Red Ensign defaced with the Coronet of the Duke of Cornwall over the shield of the Duchy of Cornwall.
		Ensign of Royal Hamilton Amateur Dinghy Club	
		Ensign of the Royal Lymington Yacht Club	
		Ensign of the Royal Norfolk and Suffolk Yacht Club	
		Ensign of the Royal Victoria Yacht Club	The Red Ensign defaced with a Royal Crown and the letters 'VR' – Victoria Regina.
		Ensign of the Royal Windermere Yacht Club	The Red Ensign defaced with a Royal Crown.
		Ensign of the Royal Yacht Association	The Red Ensign defaced with a Naval Crown.
		Ensign of the St Helier Yacht Club	The Red Ensign defaced with an anchor and two crossed axes.
		Ensign of the West Mersea Yacht Club	The Red Ensign defaced with three swords (Essex symbol).
		Ensign of the Royal Air Force Sailing Association	The RAF Ensign defaced with an eagle.
		Burgee of the Cargreen Yacht Club	A green burgee defaced with a red brick chimney outlined in black in the hoist.
		Burgee of the Flushing Sailing Club	A black burgee defaced with a gold letter "V".
		Burgee of the Helford River Sailing Club	A blue burgee divided by a red cross outlined in white, with a gold ship in the centre.
		Burgee of the Humber Yawl Club	A red burgee surrounded by a white border on all sides and defaced with the initials "HYC" in white.
		Burgee of the Itchenor Sailing Club	
		Burgee of the Island Cruising Club of Salcombe	A green burgee defaced with the monogram "ICC" in gold.
		Burgee of the Junior Offshore Group	
		Burgee of the Looe Sailing Club	A diagonally divided burgee of seven red and yellow stripes (four red and three yellow) defaced with a black silhouette of a ship on the waves.
		Burgee of the Mount's Bay Sailing Club	
		Burgee of the Mylor Yacht Club	A white burgee divided by a red Saint George's Cross with the shield from the arms of the Duchy of Cornwall in the canton.
		Burgee of the Padstow Sailing Club	A white burgee defaced with a red-and-white fish and surrounded by a blue border.
		Burgee of the Penzance Sailing Club	A black burgee divided by a white Saint Piran's Cross, with a black skull and crossbones on a white disc in the centre.
		Burgee of the Port Navas Yacht Club	A black burgee with the white-coloured initials "PNYC" arranged vertically in the hoist and separated from the rest of the burgee by a vertical white line, and the rest of the burgee divided by a white Saint Piran's Cross with a gold ship's wheel to the upper hoist of the cross.
		Burgee of the Porthpean Sailing Club	A blue burgee divided by a white cross, defaced in the centre with a white shield bearing a red saltire.
		Burgee of The Quay Sailing Club	A white burgee with a crimson border, defaced with a white shield containing three black bells (two above and one below) in the hoist, and the black-coloured initials "Q.S.C." in the fly.
		Burgee of the Restronguet Sailing Club	A blue burgee defaced with a white seashell and surrounded by a white border.
		Burgee of the Rock Sailing and Waterski Club	A yellow burgee defaced with a black silhouette of a camel.
		Burgee of the St Ives Sailing Club	
		Burgee of the St Mawes Sailing Club	A white-and-red quartered burgee with the shield from the arms of the Duchy of Cornwall in the canton.
		Burgee of the Saltash Sailing Club	
		Burgee of the Seadog Owners Association	A blue burgee with a golden simplified silhouette of a Seadog 30 in the middle.
		Burgee of the Sea View Yacht Club	
		Burgee of the Torpoint Mosquito Sailing Club	A dark blue burgee divided by a white cross and defaced with a red diamond in the centre.

== Royal Standards ==
=== King Charles III ===
Flag	Date	Use	Description
	1801 (original version) 1837 (removed Hanover arms)	The Royal Standard of the United Kingdom (except Scotland)	A banner of the King's Arms, the Royal Coat of Arms of the United Kingdom
	1801 (original version) 1837 (removed Hanover arms)	The Royal Standard of the United Kingdom (only Scotland)	A banner of the King's Arms used in Scotland, the Royal Coat of Arms of the United Kingdom used in Scotland

=== Standards and banners of the Prince of Wales ===
Flag	Date	Use	Description
		Standard of the Prince of Wales, used in England and Northern Ireland	A banner of the coat of arms of the Prince of Wales, the Royal coat of arms of the United Kingdom defaced with a label of three points.
		Standard of the Prince of Wales as Duke of Cornwall	Fifteen golden circles (bezants) on a black field
		Standard of the Prince of Wales as Duke of Rothesay.	The Royal Banner of Scotland defaced with a label of three points.
		Banner of the Prince of Wales as Duke of Rothesay	Banner of the Duke's arms, first and fourth quarters representing the title of Great Steward of Scotland, the second and third quarters representing the title of Lord of the Isles, (as per the arms of Clan Stewart of Appin). In the centre on an inescutcheon the arms of the heir apparent to the King of Scots
	1962–present	Banner of the Prince of Wales, used in Wales	A banner of the coat of arms of Wales. In the centre on an inescutcheon the coronet of the Prince of Wales

=== Other members of the Royal Family ===
Flag	Date	Use	Description
	2022–present	Standard of Queen Camilla, consort of Charles III	Banner of the Royal coat of arms of the United Kingdom impaling the arms of Bruce Shand
	2022–present	Standard of the Duke of Sussex	Banner of the Duke's coat of arms, the Royal coat of arms of the United Kingdom with a three-point label bearing scallops in reference to the arms of Diana, Princess of Wales
	1978–present	Standard of Andrew Mountbatten-Windsor	Banner of Andrew's coat of arms, the Royal coat of arms of the United Kingdom with a three-point label, the centre label bearing a blue anchor
	2006–present	Standard of Princess Beatrice, Mrs Edoardo Mapelli Mozzi	Banner of the Princess's coat of arms, the Royal coat of arms of the United Kingdom with a five-point label with three bees in alternating points
	2008–present	Standard of Princess Eugenie, Mrs Jack Brooksbank	Banner of the Princess's coat of arms, the Royal coat of arms of the United Kingdom with a five-point label with three thistle heads in alternating points
		Standard of the Duke of Edinburgh	Banner of the Duke's coat of arms, the Royal coat of arms of the United Kingdom with a three-point label, the centre label bearing a Tudor Rose
		Standard of the Princess Royal	Banner of the Princess's coat of arms, the Royal coat of arms of the United Kingdom with a three-point label, the first and third labels bearing a red cross, the centre label bearing a red heart.
	1962–present	Standard of the Duke of Gloucester	Banner of the Duke's coat of arms, the Royal coat of arms of the United Kingdom with a five-point label, the first, third and fifth labels bearing a red cross, the second and fourth labels bearing a red lion.
		Standard of the Duke of Kent	Banner of the Duke's coat of arms, the Royal coat of arms of the United Kingdom with a five-point label, the first, third and fifth labels bearing a blue anchor, the second and fourth labels bearing a red cross.
		Standard of Prince Michael of Kent	Banner of the Prince's coat of arms, the Royal coat of arms of the United Kingdom with a five-point label, the first, third and fifth labels bearing a red cross, the second and fourth labels bearing a blue anchor.
	1961–present	Standard of Princess Alexandra, The Honourable Lady Ogilvy	Banner of the Princess's coat of arms, the Royal coat of arms of the United Kingdom with a five-point label, the first and fifth labels bearing a red heart, the second and fourth labels bearing a blue anchor, the third label bearing a red cross.

=== Others ===
Flag	Date	Use	Description
	1323–present	The Royal Banner of Scotland	A banner of the ancient Royal Arms of Scotland, now officially used in Scotland by representatives of the sovereign, including the First Minister of Scotland (as keeper of the Great Seal of Scotland), the Lord High Commissioner to the General Assembly of the Church of Scotland, the Lord Lyon King of Arms and Lord-Lieutenants within their lieutenancies. This flag is also used at the Royal residences of Holyrood Palace and Balmoral Castle when the sovereign is not present.
		Flag used by the Lord-Lieutenants, the sovereign's representative in the counties of the United Kingdom, except by those in Scotland (see above).	The Union Jack, defaced with a sword, crowned.
		Standard of the Duchy of Lancaster	The Royal Banner of England, with a three-point label, each containing three fleurs-de-lis
		Standard of the Lord Warden of the Cinque Ports	A banner of the Lord's coat of arms featuring three Lions passant guardant conjoined to three hulls, all in gold

== Government ==
Flag	Date	Use	Description
	2021–present	Flag of the House of Commons	A gold parliamentary portcullis and coronet (set slightly towards the hoist from centre) on a field of green.
		Ensign of HM Revenue & Customs	A Blue Ensign defaced with the badge of HM Customs and Excise
		Flag of the Senedd Cymru.	White with the logo of the Senedd Cymru in red
	2008–present	Ensign of the Border Force	A Blue Ensign defaced with the badge of the Border Force
		Ensign of HM Coastguard	A Blue Ensign defaced with the badge of HM Coastguard
		Ensign used aboard ships of the Scottish Government, such as the patrol boats of the Marine Scotland.	A Blue Ensign defaced with the badge of the former Scottish Fisheries Protection Agency
		Ensign of the Commissioners of the Northern Lights	A Blue Ensign defaced with a lighthouse
		Northern Lighthouse Board Commissioners Flag	A White Ensign with a pre-1801 Union Flag in the canton, defaced with a blue lighthouse in the fly, is the only British flag to still use the pre-1801 Union Flag. This flag is only flown from vessels with the Commissioners aboard and from the Headquarters of the NLB, in Edinburgh.
		Ensign of Trinity House	A Red Ensign defaced with a Trinity House jack
		Flag of the Metropolitan Police	The Badge of the Metropolitan Police on a blue background, with white squares at the edge
		Ensign of the Metropolitan Police	The Blue Ensign, defaced with the Badge of the Metropolitan Police.
	1943–1945; 1949–1968	Flag of the Civil Defence Service/Civil Defence Corps	A blue and yellow flag defaced with a Tudor Crown and the letters 'CD'.
	2017–present	Ensign used aboard ships of the Welsh Government, such as the patrol boats of the Marine and Fisheries Division.	A Blue Ensign defaced with a yellow dragon.

== Church ==
Flag	Date	Use	Description
		Flag of the Anglican Communion	A dark blue background with the symbol of the Anglican Communion (a compass rose surmounted by a bishop's mitre; in the centre is a cross of St George). The Greek motto, Ἡ ἀλήθεια ἐλευθερώσει ὑμᾶς ("The truth will set you free") is a quotation from John 8:32.
	1999–present	Flag used by the Church of Ireland	The flag of Saint Patrick is one of two flags authorised for use on Church of Ireland buildings and grounds. The other is that of the Anglican Communion above.
		Flag of the Church of Scotland	The flag of Scotland with the burning bush in the centre.
	1954–present	Flag of the Church in Wales	A navy blue cross with a celtic cross in the centre.
		Flag of Westminster Abbey	Tudor arms between Tudor roses, above Edward the Confessor's arms.
		Flag of the Church of St Margaret, Westminster Abbey	A blue flag defaced in the centre with a gold dragon's head pierced by a cross, and a gold crowned portcullis in the canton.
	2014–present	Flag of Exeter Cathedral	The coat of arms of Exeter Cathedral on a field of blue.
		Flag of Southwark Cathedral	A banner of the Cathedral's coat of arms.
		Flag of Worcester Cathedral	The Cross of Saint George defaced with the coat of arms of Worcester Cathedral in the canton.
	2013–present	Flag of the Church of St James the Great, Birlingham	The Cross of Saint George impaled with a blue field defaced with three gold scallop shells of Saint James (two towards the hoist and one towards the fly).
		Flag of St James Church, Quedgeley	Three gold scallop shells of Saint James (two above and one below) on a field of red.

== Diplomatic flags ==
Flag	Date	Use	Description
		Flag used by British embassies	A Union Jack defaced with the royal coat of arms of the United Kingdom
		Flag used by British High Commissions	High commissions fly the Union Jack
		Flag used by British consulates and consulates-general	A Union Jack defaced with the Royal Crown
		Flag used by British consular officials when embarked in small boats; flag displayed at bow	A Blue Ensign defaced with the royal coat of arms of the United Kingdom

== Communities and local government ==
Since 2012 it has been permitted in planning law in England to fly a flag of any British island, county, district, borough, burgh, parish, city, town or village without planning permission as an advertisement. Official bodies such as the Department for Communities and Local Government encourage the use of these flags

Banner of arms (flag form of a coat of arms) have long been used to represent local authority councils and the areas they cover. Some of these include the banners used by Northumberland and Hertfordshire County Councils which before 2012 had already "released" their banners of arms for use as historic county flags, in most cases a historic county flag is derived or (for the two counties) directly adopted.

Community (or civic) flags have also been adopted to cover small areas or places.

=== Local county ===
Flag	Date	Use	Description
		Angus	Consisting of four-quarters containing a red crowned lion passant, a gold cinquefoil, a blue-white checked strip crossed with buckled red belt, and a depiction of the heart of Robert the Bruce to represent the four ancient earldoms of Angus.
	1974–present	Flag of Cambridgeshire County Council	Banner of the arms adopted after 1974 with elements from the old Cambridgeshire and Isle of Ely CC and Huntingdon and Peterborough CC.
	12th century–present	St Piran's Flag – the Flag of Cornwall	A white cross on a black field, formally adopted in 1890
	Defunct	Flag of Cumbria County Council	On the green border are Parnassus flowers (representing Cumberland) interspersed with white roses (Yorkshire) superimposed with red roses (Lancashire). The centre of the shield is made up of segments of blue, white, yellow and green divided by wavy vertical lines and zig-zag horizontal lines. This depicts the new County and from hoist to fly the vertical lines of segments show: blue and white for the sea, blue and yellow (gold) for the lakes and agriculture, green and white for mountains and lakes and green and yellow (gold) for mountains and agriculture.
	1961, altered for post-1974 reform and transferred to unitary authority in 2009	County Durham District	A yellow cross on a blue field with lions rampant in each quarter from the Bishopric of Durham's arms, black diamonds on each arm (representing coal and industry) added when the arms was originally adopted with a later change to add a White Rose of York on a blue square in centre of the cross (the latter added in 1974 to represent the area of Yorkshire in Teesdale administered by the council).
	1889, altered for post-1974 reform	Flag of East Sussex	Six golden martlets on red with a Saxon crown above, white wave later added between the crown and birds.
	1965-1986, 2025–present	Flag of Greater London	Adopted by the Greater London Council (1965–1986), this banner of arms is the last official flag of Greater London. The waves are taken from the flag of the former London County Council (1914–1965) and the Saxon crown from the flag of Middlesex. The Greater London Authority (2001–present) used multiple logo variations without officially flag until November 2025 when the arms and badge of the former Greater London Council were granted to the Greater London Authority.
	Defunct	Flag of Greater Manchester	Ten golden castles (arranged in rows of 3-2-3-2) on a red background, fringed by a golden border in the style of a castle battlement.
	1992–present	Hampshire county banner of arms	A gold crown on red above a Lancaster rose on gold, the crown representing the former Saxon kingdom of Wessex and the rose representing England.
	1889 council, re-adopted for post-1996 reformed council	Flag of Herefordshire	
	2008–present	Flag of Hertfordshire	On white and blue wavy background, a Hart reclining on a yellow shield. The use of blue and yellow is derived from Saint Alban's Cross.
		Isle of Wight Council banner of arms	A castle and three gold anchors on a blue background.
	1903, re-adopted for post-1974 reformed council	Flag of Lancashire County Council	Red with two full width yellow triangles pointing down and one pointing up, a red rose on each yellow triangle.
		Leicestershire banner of arms	Flag of the historic county of Leicestershire, registered with the Flag Institute on 16 July 2021
	Defunct	Flag of Merseyside	
		Flag of Norfolk County Council	Council banner of arms. For County flag see Flag of Norfolk
	1951–present	Flag of Northumberland	Local authority flag with use permitted to local people. Based on the St Oswald banner.
		Flag of Rutland	
	Defunct	Flag of South Yorkshire	Red and white waves with one and two half black lozenges to represent coal with white roses to represent Yorkshire.
		Flag of Staffordshire	All the devices on the flag come from arms of various Earls of Stafford. The red chevron on gold was the arms of the de Staffords. It is charged with the family's famous Stafford knot badge.
	Defunct	Flag of Tyne and Wear	A blue field with a white turret in the centre to represent Hadrian's wall with a white wavy line above to represent the rivers.
	1931–present	Flag of Warwickshire – the Bear and Ragged Staff	A silver bear with red muzzle and gold collar and chain supporting a silver ragged staff on a red shield, with three red crosses (each of which has its arms crossed) on a gold band at the top.
	Defunct	Flag of the West Midlands	Banner of arms of the former county council. The flag has two dancetty barrulets interlaced to form a W and M representing the initials of "West Midlands".
		Flag of West Sussex	Banner of arms of the local authority. Blue and gold flag with six golden martlets.
		Flag of Worcestershire CC	Banner of arms of the local authority.

=== Local district ===
Flag	Date	Use	Description
		Flag of Aberdeen	Three white/grey castles on a red field, taken from the city's coat of arms.
		Flag of Belfast	A banner of the city's coat of arms. (Registered by the Flag Institute)
		Flag of Cardiff	A banner of the city's coat of arms. (Registered by the Flag Institute)
		Flag of Durham	A red cross outlined in white on a black field.
		Flag of Edinburgh	A heraldic flag derived from the arms of Edinburgh Council. (Registered by the Flag Institute)
		Flag of Glasgow	A banner of the city's coat of arms.
		Flag of Lincoln	A banner of the city's coat of arms.
		Flag of the City of London (vertical banner)	Vertical banner of the arms of the City of London Corporation.
		Flag of Plymouth (City and Unitary Authority)	Banner of the arms of Plymouth City Council.
		Flag of Portsmouth	A banner of the city's coat of arms.
		Flag of Shrewsbury	A banner of the town's coat of arms, featuring three leopard faces known locally as loggerheads.
	2017–present	Flag of Southampton	An anchor and Tudor Rose on a red and white background.
	2025–present	Flag of Telford and Wrekin	The Iron Bridge on a yellow triangle and cog on a bicolour of blue and green
		Flag of York	A banner of the city's coat of arms.

=== Civic ===
Flag	Date	Use	Description
		Flag of Abingdon-on-Thames	Banner of arms.
		Flag of Appleby-in-Westmorland	A golden heraldic apple tree on blue. (Registered by the Flag Institute)
	1893–present	Flag of Bexhill-on-Sea	A red saltire, which divides the flag into four sections: two of them white (top and bottom) and two green (hoist and fly). (Registered by the Flag Institute)
		Flag of Birmingham	Golden vertical zig-zag offset to hoist dividing blue and red, with a bulls head in the centre. The flag of city as opposed to the banner of the council. (Registered by the Flag Institute)
		Flag of Calne	Golden circle over green, blue, and white stripes. (Registered by the Flag Institute)
		Flag of Chesham	Banner of arms.
		Flag of Colchester	Banner of arms.
	2018–present	Flag of Coventry	Silhouette of Lady Godiva on a white field with two stripes in the traditional shade of Coventry blue. Updated in 2018 from the 1345 arms flag depicting an elephant. (Registered by the Flag Institute)
		Flag of Craig-y-Dorth (Cwmcarvan)	Two golden wyverns combatant on blue and red, over a golden triangle with a red loaf. (Registered by the Flag Institute)
		Flag of Dewsbury	Banner of arms.
		Flag of Digbeth	Triband of blue, thinner black, and white with counterchanged rings over the black-white division and ripples beneath. (Registered by the Flag Institute)
		Flag of Evenley	Three golden cowslips on a green hoist, with a dragon slain by Saint George on the yellow field. (Registered by the Flag Institute)
		Flag of Finchfield	Three golden finches with an interlocking pattern of stylised wheat. (Registered by the Flag Institute)
		Flag of Flore	A white blossom flower on purple and a purple plum on gold divided by a diagonal wavy line. (Registered by the Flag Institute)
		Flag of Hampton Poyle	A white saltire on red with a black border with golden bezants. (Registered by the Flag Institute)
		Flag of Horningsea	A potter at his wheel counterchanged across a vertical bisection red and white. (Registered by the Flag Institute)
		Flag of Kingswinford	A white boar with a gold crown on blue. (Registered by the Flag Institute)
		Flag of the City of London	A red cross on a white field, with a red sword in the canton. A banner of the arms of the City of London Corporation. (Registered by the Flag Institute)
		Flag of Maidstone	Banner of arms.
		Flag of Montrose	A red rose on a white field.
		Flag of Nenthead	A green triangle with white eight pointed star over black and white hoops. (Registered by the Flag Institute)
		Flag of Newbury	Red and blue quarters with castle, teasel, wheatsheaf, and swords. A wavy white-edged blue stripe separates the upper and lower halves. (Registered by the Flag Institute)
	2009–present	Flag of Newton Abbot	A stylised image of St Leonard's Tower in the centre of a modified flag of Devon. The green represents the moors, the black the granite and the white the clay of the surrounding area. The cross is also used to represent a major crossroads in the town which converged on the clock tower. The arms of the cross represent the routes to Exeter and London, Bovey Tracey and the moors, Totnes and Plymouth, and Torquay and Brixham.
		Flag of Penrith	A red saltire on white with blue knot/flowers in each quarter. (Registered by the Flag Institute)
		Flag of Petersfield	Crossed keys on a green field with a central white horizontal stripe and wavy blue band along the upper edge. (Registered by the Flag Institute)
		Flag of Pewsey	A white horse (Pewsey White Horse) on green hills below an oaken crown. (Registered by the Flag Institute)
		Flag of Plumpton	Blue on purple divided horizontally by white crossing gates, a yellow plum on each bottom corner and a centered white horse above.
		Flag of Poole	Dolphin on wavy black and gold bars below the three scallop shells of St James. (Registered by the Flag Institute)
		Flag of Preston	A blue cross with white arm centres on white with a paschal lamb in the centre. (Registered by the Flag Institute)
		Flag of Renfrew	The burgh's coat of arms on a blue field.
		Flag of St Albans – the Cross of St Alban	A golden saltire on sky blue.
		Flag of St Anne's on Sea (Lytham St Annes)	A white Victorian lifeboat in upper hoist above two golden wavy hoops all over blue. (Registered by the Flag Institute)
		Flag of Staining, Lancashire	A white windmill and plough on blue divided by a white diagonal series of rectangles with a blue Celtic cross in the centre. (Registered by the Flag Institute)
		Flag of Stirling	The Scottish flag defaced in the centre of the saltire with the red lion rampant from the Scottish royal banner, with two caltraps in the upper and lower sections, and two spur-rowels in the hoist and fly sections.
		Flag of the stannary town of Tavistock	A white field with a blue bend, defaced with the coat of arms.
	2017–present	Flag of Thame	The flag results from a competition held in the town. It incorporates Thame Town Council’s colours with part of the town’s emblem on the hoist side, and three waves – which signify the countryside, the Phoenix Trail and the River Thame – on the fly side.
		Flag of Tywyn	A black raven on gold and a white dolphin on blue divided by a diagonal wavy line. (Registered by the Flag Institute)
		Flag of Willenhall	Three golden locks on red and a crowned set of golden crossed keys on blue divided by a crenellated vertical line. (Registered by the Flag Institute)
		Flag of Wing, Buckinghamshire	A golden bird in a golden arch all on blue. (Registered by the Flag Institute)
		Flag of Wreay	A golden cross on green with a two crossed white pipes and a bell in the first quarter. (Registered by the Flag Institute)
		Flag of Wroxton	A red cross on blue and fimbriated white with white birds, pick axe, and leaf in the quarters. (Registered by the Flag Institute)

=== Islands ===
Flag	Date	Use	Description
	2017–present	Flag of the Isle of Barra	Green, with a white Scandinavian Cross showing the ancestry of the people and places names of Barra. The green represents the green of the Barra Isles.
	9 September 1976 – present	Flag of the Comhairle nan Eilean Siar (Council of the Western Isles)	Or, on a fess wavy Azure between three lymphads, oars in action, sails furled Sable, flagged Gules, two barrulets wavy Argent.
	1954–1969; 2010–present	Flag of Lundy	A blue flag with a white letter "L" on the hoist side.
	2007–present	Flag of Orkney	A blue Nordic cross outlined in yellow on a red field.
	14 April 2010 – present	Flag of the Isle of Portland (Registered by the Flag Institute)	The colours represent the landscape of the area: Portland stone, grass and the sea. The white tower represents the castles and the naval coronet shows the long connection with the Royal Navy.
	February 2002 – present	Flag of the Isles of Scilly	The Scillonian Cross
	2017–present	Flag of South Uist	A green flag bearing a blue Nordic cross fimbriated in white
	1969–present	Flag of Shetland	A white Nordic cross on a light blue field
	2020–present	Flag of the Isle of Skye	A yellow Hebridean Birlinn in upper hoist above a yellow Nordic Cross on a sky blue field interlaced with a white ring.
	2009–present	Flag of the Isle of Wight	A pale blue field with a nicked rhombus (a representation of the island's shape) and at the bottom six alternating bars wavy, white and navy blue.

== University flags ==
Flag	Date	Use	Description
		Flag of the University of Aberdeen	
		Flag of Bangor University	
		Flag of Edinburgh Napier University	A flag diagonally divided into white and red – white in the top and fly, red in the hoist and bottom.
		Flag of Queen's University Belfast	
		Flag of the University of Bristol	
		Flag of the University of Cambridge	
		Flag of the University of East Anglia	
		Flag of the University of Edinburgh	A blue saltire on a white field, with a thistle in the upper quarter, a castle in the lower quarter, and an open book in the centre of the saltire. It is a banner of the University's coat of arms.
		Flag of the University of Glasgow	
		Flag of the University of Hull	The Cross of Saint George defaced in the centre with the University's coat of arms.
		Flag of the University of Leicester	
		Flag of the University of London	
		Flag of the University of Oxford	An open book with the inscription Dominus Illuminatio Mea (Latin for "The Lord is my light"), surrounded by three golden crowns (two above and one below) on a blue field.
		Flag of the University of Roehampton	
		Flag of the University of St Andrews	A banner of the University's coat of arms.
		Flag of Swansea University	
		Flag of Wrexham University	
		Flag of the University of Warwick	

== Miscellaneous ==
Flag	Date	Use	Description
	2016–present	Flag of the Flag Institute	
		Flag of the Royal National Lifeboat Institution	A red cross with a blue border on a white field, with the letters RNLI in red in each quarter, defaced with a crowned anchor.
		Flag of the St John Ambulance Brigade	
		A Branch Standard of the Royal British Legion	A Blue Ensign with a yellow band across the middle with the words Royal British Legion and the name of the branch.
		Flag of Saint David	A gold cross on a black field. This is flown in Wales especially on St David's Day. This flag and the St Patrick's flag are not considered national flags but may be flown without special consent.
		Flag of Saint Aldhelm	A white cross on a red field.
	2021–present	Flag of Saint Augustine of Canterbury	A white cross on a black field with a gold bishop's pallium topped by a small gold cross in the canton.
		Flag of Saint Edmund the Martyr	A red Saint George's Cross on a white field, defaced in the centre with a blue shield bearing two crossed gold arrows passing through a gold crown.
		Flag of Saint Peter, Westminster Abbey	Two crossed gold keys beneath a gold ring on a field of red. The symbols represent the two Patron Saints of the Abbey: the ring of Saint Edward the Confessor (founder of the Abbey), and the keys of Saint Peter.
		Flag of Saint Richard of Chichester	A white cross on a red field with a white chalice in each quarter.
	1878–present	Flag of the Salvation Army	A maroon flag with a blue border defaced by a yellow star with the Salvation Army's motto "Blood & Fire" written on it.
		The current UK flag (the Union Jack) holds symbolism from England, Scotland, and Northern Ireland, but lacks any symbolism of the only other UK nation in Wales. Therefore, it has been suggested the Union Jack be redesigned to include representation of Wales or a completely new or alternate flag be used.	Suggested redesigns of the Union Jack, including one with the red dragon from the flag of Wales added in the centre; two variations with the inclusion of yellow from the flag of Saint David; and one with the inclusion of the green element of the flag of Wales.
	1816 to at least 1935	British republican flag proposal used within the Chartism movement.	A British republican flag, which originated in 1816, in use until at least 1935.
		British republican flag proposal within the Chartism movement.	The English Republican Tricolour proposed by Hugh Williams in 1838 and described in LJ "Spartacus" Linton's 1851 poem "Our Tricolour".

== Historic areas ==
It is explicitly permitted to fly the flag of the Black Country, East Anglia, Wessex, any Part of Lincolnshire, any Riding of Yorkshire or any historic county within the United Kingdom without needing any permission or consent.

=== Kingdoms ===
Flag	Date	Use	Description
	1900–present	Flag of East Anglia.	The arms ascribed to the Wuffingas dynasty of East Anglia, three crowns on a blue shield, superimposed on a St George's Cross (Registered by the Flag Institute).
	c.13th century / 2014–present	Flag of Mercia – the Cross of St Alban	A gold saltire on a blue field; the traditional flag of the Kingdom of Mercia, still flown on Tamworth Castle.
	Ancient	Kingdom of Northumbria; North England; Modern Northumbria_{(Northumberland and the county of Durham)}	The oldest flag in England. The depiction shown here is apparently based on a brief mention in Bede's Ecclesiastical History of the English People as a banner "composed of gold and purple" (auro et purpura conpositum) Eight alternating stripes (Note: Historic: gold and purple Alternative: gold and red Registered: gold and burgundy)
	1970s–present	Flag of Wessex	A gold wyvern on a red field. (Registered by the Flag Institute)

=== Counties ===
Flag	Date	Use	Description
	2023–present	Flag of Aberdeenshire	Party per pale or and purpure; on a castle triple-towered argent an ancient crown party per pale of the second and first. (Chosen by competition) (Registered by the Flag Institute)
	2014–present	Flag of Anglesey	Gules between three lions rampant or a chevron of the second: the attributed arms of Hwfa ap Cynddelw, the traditional badge of the county. (Registered by the Flag Institute)
	2023–present	Flag of Banffshire	Orange top half, with the sun in white in the upper hoist, over white and blue stripes and five counter-changed roundels in the form of a railway viaduct. (Chosen by competition) (Registered by the Flag Institute)
	2014–present	Flag of Bedfordshire	Based on the arms of Beauchamp, Barons of Bedford (red and gold) and Russell, Dukes of Bedford (black with 3 scallops). Unlike the old county council banner, the bars wavy are counterchanged per pale. (Registered by the Flag Institute)
	2017–present	Flag of Berkshire	Based on the traditional badge of the county: a stag beneath Hearne's Oak. (Registered by the Flag Institute)
	2023–present	Flag of Berwickshire	A horozontal blue and green bicolour divided in the middle by a white chain, with a leaping silver salmon in the blue section, and a curved gold ear of barley in the green section.
	2011–present	Flag of Buckinghamshire	A red and black field bearing a chained swan: a traditional badge of the county. (Registered by the Flag Institute) (Chosen in a BBC competition)
	2012–present	Flag of Caernarfonshire	Vert, three eagles displayed in fess Or. (Registered by the Flag Institute)
	2016–present	Flag of Caithness	A Scandinavian cross flag for the county's Norse heritage, with the civic badge of Caithness, a ship with a raven on its sail, in the upper hoist. (Registered by the Flag Institute) (Enrolled by the Lord Lyon)
	2015–present	Flag of Cambridgeshire	Blue with wavy lines in Cambridge blue, and the three crowns of East Anglia. (Registered by the Flag Institute) (Chosen by competition)
	2013–present	Flag of Cheshire	Azure a Sword erect between three Garbs Or (Registered by the Flag Institute)
	12th century – present	St Piran's Flag – the Flag of Cornwall	A white cross on a black field. (Registered by the Flag Institute)
	2012–present	The Flag of Cumberland	Based on a banner of the arms of the former Cumberland County Council.(Registered by the Flag Institute)
	2006–present	Flag of Derbyshire	A green cross with a white border on a sky blue field, with a gold Tudor rose in the centre. (Registered by the Flag Institute) (Chosen in a BBC competition)
	2003–present	Flag of Devon – St Petroc's flag	A white cross with a black border on a green field. (Registered by the Flag Institute) (Chosen by competition)
	2008–present	Flag of Dorset – the Dorset Cross – St Wite's Cross	A white cross with a red border on a gold field.(Registered by the Flag Institute) (Chosen by competition)
	2013–present	Flag of County Durham	A gold and blue horizontal bicolour with St. Cuthbert's Cross countercharged upon it. (Registered by the Flag Institute) (Chosen by competition)
	2018–present	Flag of East Lothian (Haddingtonshire)	A blue field with a gold saltire voided blue; over all a lozenge with a lion rampant. (Registered by the Flag Institute) (Chosen by competition)
	Possibly 6th century – present	Flag of Essex	A red field with three white, gold hilted Saxon swords (Seaxes). (Registered by the Flag Institute)
	2015–present	Flag of Flintshire	Argent, between four Cornish choughs sable a cross engrailed flory of the second. (Registered by the Flag Institute); the arms attributed to Edwin Tegeingl (Edwin ap Gronwy)
	12th century – present	Flag of Glamorgan	Gules, three Chevronels Argent. (Registered by the Flag Institute)
	2008–present	Flag of Gloucestershire – the Severn Cross	The winning entry in a competition to commemorate the county's millennium. (Registered by the Flag Institute) (Chosen by competition)
	2019–present	Flag of Hampshire	A gold Saxon crown on a red field above a Tudor rose on a gold field.(Registered by the Flag Institute)
	2019–present	Flag of Herefordshire	On a dark red background, a white bull's head above three wavy lines, ordered white-blue-white.(Registered by the Flag Institute)
	2008–present	Flag of Hertfordshire	On a waved background, a Hart reclining on a yellow shield – a flag displayed on the crest of the county arms(Registered by the Flag Institute) A banner of the council's arms
	2009–present	Flag of Huntingdonshire	On a green background, a gold, ribboned hunting horn – a flag displayed on the crest of the county arms (Registered by the Flag Institute)
	1605–present	Flag of Kent	A red field with the white horse of Kent. (Registered by the Flag Institute)
	2016–present	Flag of Kirkcudbrightshire	A green and white quartered field bearing the Cross of St Cuthbert (from whom the county is named). (Registered by the Flag Institute) (Enrolled by the Lord Lyon)
	2008–present	Flag of Lancashire	The red rose of Lancashire on a yellow field. (Registered by the Flag Institute)
	2021–present	Flag of Leicestershire	Per fess dancetty gules and argent, a cinquefoil pierced ermine above a fox gules. (Registered by the Flag Institute)
	2005–present	Flag of Lincolnshire	Quarterly Vert and Azure, on a Cross Gules fimbriated Or a Fleur-de-Lis of the last. (Registered by the Flag Institute) (Chosen in a BBC competition)
	2015–present	Flag of Merionethshire	Azure, three goats rampant Argent, armed and unguled Or; from the dexter base the sun in his splendour issuant Or. (Registered by the Flag Institute)
	1910–present	Flag of Middlesex	A red field with three white, gold hilted Saxon swords or Seaxes under a gold Saxon crown. (Registered by the Flag Institute)
	2011–present	Flag of Monmouthshire	Per pale Azure and Sable three Fleurs-de-lis Or. (Registered by the Flag Institute)
	2023–present	Flag of Morayshire	A green strip in the hoist bearing a gold wheatsheaf; orange over blue with a wavy division. (Chosen by competition) (Registered by the Flag Institute)
	2014–present	Flag of Norfolk	Party per pale or and sable, a bend ermine; the attributed arms of Ralph de Gael or Guader, 1st Earl of Norfolk (Registered by the Flag Institute)
	2014–present	Flag of Northamptonshire	Maroon with a gold cross fimbriated black, and in the centre the county's traditional rose. (Registered by the Flag Institute) (Chosen by competition)
	1951–present	Flag of Northumberland	Local authority flag with use permitted to local people. Based on the St Oswald banner. (Registered by the Flag Institute)
	2011–present	Flag of Nottinghamshire	A red cross fimbriated white on a green field, with an inescutcheon in the centre showing Robin Hood. (Registered by the Flag Institute) (Chosen in a BBC competition)
	2007–present	Flag of Orkney	A blue Nordic cross outlined in yellow on a red field. (Registered by the Flag Institute) (Enrolled by the Lord Lyon)
	2017–present	Flag of Oxfordshire	The arms of the pre-1974 County Council: blue with a red ox head on a double bend wavy, between a wheatsheaf and an oak. (Registered by the Flag Institute)
	1988–present	Flag of Pembrokeshire	A yellow cross on a blue field with a variation of the red and white Tudor rose in the centre. (Registered by the Flag Institute)
	2015–present	Flag of Rutland	A green field strewn with acorns and a golden horseshoe in the centre. (Registered by the Flag Institute)
	1969–present	Flag of Shetland	A white Nordic cross on a light blue field. (Registered by the Flag Institute) (Enrolled by the Lord Lyon)
	2012–present	Flag of Shropshire	Three leopards' faces, referred to as loggerheads locally, are a traditional emblem for Shropshire and its county town, Shrewsbury. The erminois aspect differentiates the county flag with that of Shrewsbury. (Registered by the Flag Institute) A banner of the council's arms
	2013–present	Flag of Somerset	Or, a Dragon Rampant Gules. (Registered by the Flag Institute) (Chosen by competition)
	2016–present	Flag of Staffordshire	A red chevron on gold, with the Stafford knot.(Registered by the Flag Institute) (Chosen by competition)
	2017–present	Flag of Suffolk	A Saxon crown pierced with two arrows: the traditional emblem of St Edmund, and of Suffolk.(Registered by the Flag Institute)
	2014–present	County Flag of Surrey	Chequy or and azure (De Warrenne, the first Earls of Surrey) – the traditional emblem of the county.(Registered by the Flag Institute)
	2010–present	Flag of Sussex	Based on the traditional emblem of Sussex; Six gold martlets on a blue field, first recorded in 1611 and used by many Sussex organisations. (Registered by the Flag Institute)
	December 2018 – present	Flag of Sutherland	White with a black saltire intersecting a black Scandinavian cross, a sun figure in the centre. This design won a local competition, replacing a previous winner (a swooping eagle counterchanged against a vertical bicoloured red and yellow background, with three mullets at the hoist). (Registered by the Flag Institute)
	August 2016 – present	Flag of Warwickshire	A bear and ragged staff (the badge of the Earls of Warwick) which has become a symbol of the county, white on red. (Registered by the Flag Institute)
	2011–present	Flag of Westmorland	A golden heraldic apple tree on white and red bars. (Registered by the Flag Institute)
	2009–present	Flag of Wiltshire	Alternating downward angled stripes of green and white bearing a green disc within six alternating green and white sections, on which stands an image of a great bustard. (Registered by the Flag Institute) Accepted by Wiltshire Council in December 2009
	2013–present	Flag of Worcestershire	Three black pears on a shield charged against a wavy green and blue background. (Registered by the Flag Institute) (Chosen in a BBC competition)
	1960s–present	Flag of Yorkshire	A White Rose on a blue field. (Registered by the Flag Institute)

=== Ridings of Yorkshire ===
Flag	Date	Use	Description
	2013–present	Flag of the East Riding of Yorkshire	Per pale Azure and Vert, an inverted rose Argent. (Registered by the Flag Institute) (Chosen by competition)
	2013–present	Flag of the North Riding of Yorkshire	Vert a cross azure fimbriated or, a rose argent (Registered by the Flag Institute) (Chosen by competition)
	2013–present	Flag of the West Riding of Yorkshire	(Registered by the Flag Institute) (Chosen by competition)

=== Other regions ===
Flag	Date	Use	Description
	2012–present	Flag of the Black Country	Per pall reversed Sable, Gules and Argent a pall reversed Argent over all an inverted chevron of chain counterchanged Argent, Sable, Argent. (Registered by the Flag Institute)
	2017–present	Flag of the Cinque Ports	Three gold ships' hulls on a blue field. (Registered by the Flag Institute)
	2025–present	Flag of Cumbria	A gold heraldic ancient crown on a blue background in the upper section, and a horizontal green and yellow zigzag pattern in the lower section.(Registered by the Flag Institute)
	2014–present	Flag of Exmoor	A purple field as the main base with violet and green waves separated by parallel white lines underneath. A white stag and star holds the top hoist corner. Exmoor remains the only moorland with its own flag to this day. (Registered by the Flag Institute) (Chosen by competition)

== Historical flags ==
=== National flags and ensigns ===
Flag	Date	Use	Description
	1929–1973	Ensign of the former Northern Ireland government.	The Blue Ensign defaced with the letters GNI. Used on vessels of the Northern Ireland government.
	1924–1972	The Ulster Banner – Flag of the former Government of Northern Ireland between 1953 and 1972 and still used to represent Northern Ireland in some sporting events in which Northern Ireland competes. The flag is particularly associated with the loyalist and unionist communities in Northern Ireland.	A red cross on a white field with a red hand, on a six pointed white star, crowned (representing the six counties in Northern Ireland). The Ulster Banner ceased to be officially recognised with the passing of the Northern Ireland Constitution Act 1973 which dissolved the Parliament of Northern Ireland.
	1707–1801	Flag of the Kingdom of Great Britain	First version of the Union Jack used in England from 1606 and Scotland from 1707 – the Flags of England and Scotland superimposed.
	1707–1801	Scottish Union Flag	Scottish Union Flag variant
	1783–1922	Saint Patrick's Saltire, also known as St Patrick's Cross, the symbol of The Most Illustrious Order of Saint Patrick, the British order of chivalry associated with Ireland.	A red saltire on a white field. Used to represent Ireland in the Union Jack and unofficially to represent Ireland from the Act of Union to the Anglo-Irish Treaty.
	1620–1707	English Red Ensign	The Red Ensign of the English Royal Navy
	1620–1707	English White Ensign	The White Ensign of the English Royal Navy
	1620–1707	English Blue Ensign	The Blue Ensign of the English Royal Navy
	Until 1707	Scottish Red Ensign, used by the Royal Scottish Navy	A Red Ensign with the Flag of Scotland in the canton
	1707–1801	Red Ensign of Great Britain	The Red Ensign with the first version of the Union Jack. (This was the flag flown over the Thirteen Colonies before the American Revolution)
	1707–1801	White Ensign of Great Britain	The White Ensign with the first version of the Union Jack.
	1707–1801	Blue Ensign of Great Britain	The Blue Ensign with the first version of the Union Jack.
	1649–1651	Flag of the Commonwealth of England	St George's Cross and an Irish Harp juxtaposed.
	1651–1658	Flag of the Commonwealth of England	St George's Cross and St Andrew's cross quartered.
	1658–1660	Flag of The Protectorate	The 1606 Union Jack defaced with an Irish Harp.
	1925–1936	King's Colour for the Royal Navy	A White Ensign defaced in the centre of the cross with a garter of the Order of the Garter encircling the Royal Cypher of King George V and surmounted by a Tudor Crown.
	1936–1952	King's Colour for the Royal Navy	A White Ensign defaced in the centre of the cross with a garter of the Order of the Garter encircling the Royal Cypher of King George VI and surmounted by a Tudor Crown.
	1952–2022	Queen's Colour for the Royal Navy	A White Ensign defaced in the centre of the cross with a garter of the Order of the Garter encircling the Royal Cypher of Queen Elizabeth II and surmounted by a Saint Edward's Crown.

=== Lord Protector's standard ===
Flag	Date	Use	Description
	1653–1659	Standard of the Lord Protector	The cross of St. George quartered with the cross of St. Andrew and the Irish Harp, and surmounted by an escutcheon with Cromwell's personal coat of arms.

=== Royal standards ===
Flag	Date	Use	Description
	1198–1340	Royal Banner of King Richard I	Gules, three lions passant regardant in pale or.
	1340–1395; 1399–1406	Royal Banner of King Edward III	The coat of arms of England quartered with the Royal Standard of France, the fleur-de-lis representing the English claim to the French throne.
	1395–1399	Royal Banner of King Richard II	The coat of arms of England impaled with attributed arms of King Edward the Confessor (symbolising mystical union).
	1406–1422; 1461–1470; 1471–1554; 1558–1603	Royal Banner of King Henry IV	The French quartering has been altered to three fleurs-de-lys.
	1422–1461; 1470–1471	Royal Banner of King Henry VI	The coat of arms of France impaled with the coat of arms of England.
	1554–1558	Royal Banner of Queen Mary I and King Philip	The coat of arms of Habsburg Spain impaled with the coat of arms of England.
	1603–1649; 1660–1689; 1702–1707	Royal Standard of the House of Stuart, used first by James VI and I following the 1603 Union of the Crowns	A banner of the Royal coat of arms of James VI and I, first and fourth quarters representing the Kingdom of England and the English claim to the Kingdom of France, second quarter representing the Kingdom of Scotland, third quarter representing the Kingdom of Ireland (This is the first time that Ireland has been represented on the Royal Standard).
	1689–1694	Royal Standard of King William III and II and Queen Mary II	A banner of the joint Royal coat of arms of William III and Mary II, consisting of the coat of arms of England defaced with an inescutcheon for the House of Nassau (representing William) and impaled with another undefaced version of the same coat of arms (representing Mary).
	1694–1702	Royal Standard of King William III and II	A banner of the Royal coat of arms of William III and II, first and fourth quarters representing England and the English claim to the French throne, second quarter representing Scotland, third quarter representing Ireland, with an inescutcheon for the House of Nassau.
	1707–1714	Royal Standard of the House of Stuart, under Queen Anne following the 1707 Acts of Union	A banner of the Royal coat of arms of Queen Anne, first and fourth quarters representing (newly unified) England and Scotland, second quarter representing the British claim to the French throne, third quarter representing Ireland.
	1714–1801	Royal Standard of Great Britain under the House of Hanover from 1714 to 1801	A banner of the Royal coat of arms of Great Britain, first quarter representing England and Scotland, second quarter representing the British claim to the French throne, third quarter representing Ireland, fourth quarter representing the Electorate of Hanover.
	1801–1816	Royal Standard of the United Kingdom from 1801 to 1816	A banner of the Royal arms from the creation of the United Kingdom on 1 January 1801; first and fourth quarters for England and Wales, second Scotland, third Ireland, with an inescutcheon for the Electorate of Hanover.
	1816–1837	Royal Standard of the House of Hanover from 1816 to 1837	The Royal arms reflecting the change to the Kingdom of Hanover.
	1960–2022	Personal Flag of Elizabeth II, used by the Queen in her capacity as Head of the Commonwealth	A crowned letter 'E' in gold, surrounded by a garland of gold roses on a blue background.

==== Royal consorts ====
Flag	Date	Use	Description
	1952–2021	Standard of Prince Philip, consort of Elizabeth II	A banner of the coat of arms of the Duke of Edinburgh, first quarter representing Denmark, second quarter Greece, third quarter the Mountbatten family, fourth quarter Edinburgh.
	1936–2002	Standard of Queen Elizabeth, consort of George VI	The Royal coat of arms of the United Kingdom impaled with the arms of the Earl of Strathmore: ("bows" and "lions").
	1910–1953	Standard of Queen Mary, consort of George V	The Royal coat of arms of the United Kingdom impaled with the arms of Prince Francis, Duke of Teck (the Queen's father) and Prince Adolphus, Duke of Cambridge (the Queen's maternal grandfather).
	1901–1928	Standard of Queen Alexandra, consort of Edward VII	The Royal coat of arms of the United Kingdom impaled with the arms of the King of Denmark.
	1840–1861	Standard of Prince Albert, consort of Victoria	The Royal coat of arms of the United Kingdom defaced with a three-point label (with the second point charged with the Cross of St. George), quartered with the arms of Saxony.
	1830–1849	Standard of Queen Adelaide, consort of William IV	The Royal coat of arms of the United Kingdom (1816–1837) impaled with the arms of her father, Duke Georg I of Saxe-Meiningen.
	1820–1821	Standard of Queen Caroline, consort of George IV	The Royal coat of arms of the United Kingdom (1816–1837) impaled with the arms of her father, Charles William Ferdinand, Duke of Brunswick.
	1816–1818	Standard of Queen Charlotte, consort of George III	The Royal coat of arms of the United Kingdom (1816–1837) impaled with the arms of her father, Duke Charles Louis Frederick of Mecklenburg-Strelitz.
	1801–1816	Standard of Queen Charlotte, consort of George III	The Royal coat of arms of the United Kingdom (1801–1816) impaled with the arms of her father, Duke Charles Louis Frederick of Mecklenburg-Strelitz.
	1761–1801	Standard of Queen Charlotte, consort of George III	The Royal coat of arms of Great Britain (1714–1801) impaled with the arms of her father, Duke Charles Louis Frederick of Mecklenburg-Strelitz.
	1727–1737	Standard of Queen Caroline, consort of George II	The Royal coat of arms of Great Britain (1714–1801) impaled with the arms of her father, John Frederick, Margrave of Brandenburg-Ansbach.

==== Welsh Royal Standards ====
Flag	Date	Use	Description
	1401–1416	Banner adopted by Owain Glyndŵr and thought to be derived from the counter-charged arms of the princely Houses of Mathrafal and Dinefwr. It is in use by the National Eisteddfod for Wales, Cymdeithas yr iaith and widely amongst independentist groups.	Quarterly Or and Gules, four Lions rampant counter-charged
	c. 1195 – 1378	Banner of the princely House of Aberffraw and the Kingdom of Gwynedd famously used by Llywelyn the Great, Llywelyn ap Gruffudd and Owain Lawgoch. The Prince of Wales uses a version of this flag today emblazoned with a Crown on a green shield.	Quarterly Or and Gules, four Lions passant guardant counter-charged langued and armed Azur
	c. 1100 – c. 1400	Banner of the princely House of Mathrafal used during the early Middle Ages by the rulers of Powys, Powys Wenwynwyn and later by their heirs the de la Pole (Powysian) dynasty. Modern use is rare.	Or a Lion rampant Gules langued and armed Azure
	c. 1100 – c. 1300	Banner of the princely House of Dinefwr and the Kingdom of Deheubarth, a realm which covered much of south Wales. The banner would have been used during the early Middle Ages and later by the Talbot dynasty who inherited the arms. Modern use is rare.	Gules a Lion rampant Or, a border engrailed of the last
	c. 1240 – 1282	Banner of the personal arms of Llywelyn ap Gruffudd	Argent three Lions passant Gules
	c. 1160 – c. 1350	Banner of Madog ap Gruffudd Maelor, and later the Banner of Powys Fadog	Argent a Lion rampant Sable langued and armed Gules

=== Battle flags ===
Flag	Date	Use	Description
	13th century	Banner known as Y Groes Nawdd or "The Cross of Neith" said to have been the battle flag of Llywelyn ap Gruffudd (d. 1282)	Purpure a celtic cross Or
	c. 1400 – 1416	Banner known as the Y Ddraig Aur or 'Golden Dragon' which has ancient origins. It was famously raised over Caernarfon during the Battle of Tuthill in 1401 by Owain Glyndŵr	Argent a dragon rampant Or

=== County flags ===
Flag	Date	Use	Description
	pre–2007	Unofficial flag of Orkney	A red Nordic cross on a yellow field (the Cross of Saint Magnus). It was denied formal recognition by the Lord Lyon in 2001, due to similarity with other national flags, as well as the flag of the former Kalmar Union.
	pre–2008	Unofficial flag of Lancashire	The Red Rose of Lancashire on a white field. It was denied registration by the Flag Institute, due to being almost identical to the already registered flag of the town of Montrose, Angus.
	2018	Flag of Sutherland	A swooping eagle, seen face on, against a vertical bicoloured red and yellow background, with the eagle counterchanged yellow and red; at the hoist three stars or mullets. Was originally unveiled as the Flag of Sutherland in February 2018, but was placed on hold due to backlash from residents. A public vote beginning in October 2018 led to the retirement of this flag in favour of the current design.

== See also ==
- List of English flags
  - List of Cornish flags
- List of Irish flags
  - List of Northern Irish flags
  - Northern Ireland flags issue
- List of Scottish flags
- List of Welsh flags
- Kroaz Du — The Black Cross of Brittany
- Vexillology
- Vexillological symbol
- Glossary of vexillology
- Civil flag
- Ensign (flag)
- Flag families
- Maritime flag
- National flag
- National coat of arms
- National emblem
- National seal
- National symbol
- State flag

- Galleries and lists:
  - Flags of Europe
  - Gallery of sovereign state flags
  - Gallery of flags of dependent territories
  - Lists of flags
  - List of flags by design
  - List of national flags by design
  - List of national flags of sovereign states
  - List of Japanese flags
  - List of Antarctic flags
  - List of flags by color combination
  - List of sovereign states by date of current flag adoption
  - Gallery pages of flags of country subdivisions
