= Yacht ensign =

Flag used as ensign by yachts

A yacht ensign is a flag allowed by some nations to be hoisted as the national ensign (instead of the civil ensign) by yachts.

As with any other civil ensign, the yacht ensign is the largest flag on board, and is normally flown at the stern (rear) of the ship.

Yacht ensigns differ from merchant ensigns in that their use indicates that the yacht is not carrying any cargo which requires a customs declaration. Carrying commercial cargo on a boat with a yacht ensign is deemed to be smuggling in many jurisdictions.

Australia
Royal Brighton Yacht Club, Royal Geelong Yacht Club, Royal Melbourne Yacht Club, Royal Perth Yacht Club, Royal Queensland Yacht Squadron, Royal South Australian Yacht Squadron, Royal Sydney Yacht Squadron, Royal Yacht Club of Tasmania and Royal Yacht Club of Victoria yachts registered in UK can fly the British Blue Ensign
Royal Motor Yacht Club of New South Wales
Belgium
Members of Royal yacht clubs
Denmark
General yacht ensign
Kongelig Dansk Yachtklub
Smalandenes Sejlselskab
Randers Sejlklub
Finland
Each club has a distinctive emblem placed on the white canton of the yacht ensign
France
Yacht Club de France
Ireland
Clontarf Yacht and Boat Club
Howth Yacht Club
Inland Waterways Association of Ireland
Lough Derg Sailing Club
Malahide Yacht Club
National Yacht Club
Royal Cork Yacht Club
Royal Irish Yacht Club
Royal Saint George Yacht Club
Royal Western Yacht Club of Ireland
Skerries Sailing Club
Italy
Yacht Club Italiano members can fly the Italian naval ensign
Japan
All yachts
Netherlands
Koninklijke Nederlandsche Motorboot Club
Koninklijke Nederlandsche Zeil- & Roeivereeniging
Koninklijke Roei- en Zeilvereniging De Maas
Koninklijke Watersportvereniging De Kaag
Koninklijke Zeil- en Roeivereniging Neptunus
New Zealand
Royal New Zealand Yacht Squadron, Royal Port Nicholson Yacht Club yachts registered in UK can fly the British Blue Ensign
Royal Akarana Yacht Club
Royal New Zealand Yacht Squadron
Norway
Kongelig Norsk Seilforening
Poland
Jacht Klubu Marynarki Wojennej Kotwica
Polish Yachting Association
Yacht Klub Polski
Spain
All yachts
Switzerland
Cruising Club der Schweiz
United Kingdom
Royal Yacht Squadron members can fly the British naval ensign
Royal Naval Club and Royal Albert Yacht Club, Royal Cinque Ports Yacht Club, Royal Cruising Yacht Club, Royal Dorset Yacht Club, Royal Engineer Yacht Club, Royal Gourock Yacht Club, Royal Highland Yacht Club, Royal Marine Sailing Club, Royal Motor Yacht Club, Royal Naval Sailing Association, Royal Naval Volunteer Reserve Yacht Club, Royal Northern and Clyde Yacht Club, Royal Scottish Motor Yacht Club, Royal Solent Yacht Club, Royal Southern Yacht Club, Royal Temple Yacht Club, Royal Thames Yacht Club, Royal Western Yacht Club of England, Royal Western Yacht Club of Scotland and Sussex Motor Yacht Club
Royal Anglesey Yacht Club, Royal Southampton Yacht Club and Royal Torbay Yacht Club
Aldeburgh Yacht Club
Army Sailing Association
Bar Yacht Club
City Livery Yacht Club
Conway Club Cruising Association
Cruising Association
House of Lords Yacht Club
Household Division Yacht Club
Little Ship Club
Medway Cruising Club
Medway Yacht Club
Old Worcesters Yacht Club
Parkstone Yacht Club
Poole Harbour Yacht Club
Poole Yacht Club
Royal Air Force Yacht Club
Royal Armoured Corps Yacht Club
Royal Artillery Yacht Club
Royal Bermuda Yacht Club
Royal Burnham Yacht Club
Royal Channel Islands Yacht Club
Royal Corinthian Yacht Club
Royal Cornwall Yacht Club
Royal Dee Yacht Club
Royal Forth Yacht Club
Royal Gibraltar Yacht Club
Royal Harwich Yacht Club
Royal London Yacht Club
Royal Mersey Yacht Club
Royal North of Ireland Yacht Club
Royal Northumberland Yacht Club
Royal Ocean Racing Club
Royal Plymouth Corinthian Yacht Club
Royal Ulster Yacht Club
Royal Welsh Yacht Club
Royal Yorkshire Yacht Club
Severn Motor Yacht Club
Sussex Yacht Club
Thames Motor Yacht Club
Brixham Yacht Club
House of Commons Yacht Club
Lloyd's Yacht Club
Royal Dart Yacht Club
Royal Fowey Yacht Club
Royal Hamilton Amateur Dinghy Club
Royal Lymington Yacht Club
Royal Norfolk and Suffolk Yacht Club
Royal Victoria Yacht Club
Royal Windermere Yacht Club
Royal Yachting Association
St. Helier Yacht Club
West Mersea Yacht Club
Royal Air Force Sailing Association
United States of America
All yachts
