= Flags and symbols of Yorkshire =

Flags and symbols of English county

A white rose is often used to symbolise Yorkshire

The flags and symbols of Yorkshire are emblematic, representative, or otherwise characteristic of the Yorkshire and the Humber region of England, the historic county of Yorkshire and, and their current and former subdivisions.

== White rose ==
=== White rose ===
The white rose of York originated as the symbol of the House of York.

== Yorkshire flag ==
The Yorkshire flag

The Yorkshire flag used to represent the historic county, and consists of a white rose of York placed centrally on a blue field. How the colour blue came to be associated with the county is unclear, but it may have been influenced by the use of dark blue by the Queen's Own Yorkshire Dragoons and the Yorkshire County Cricket Club.

The Flag Institute, a charity which promotes vexillology in the United Kingdom, claims that the Yorkshire Flag was designed in 1965 or earlier, and the Yorkshire Society claims that the Yorkshire Ridings Society adopted the flag in 1975. The flag was officially registered with the Flag Institute on 29 July 2008 at the request of the Yorkshire Ridings Society. Other designs proposed for the county flag included Saint George's Cross with a white rose-en-soleil (a rose superimposed on a sunburst) in the centre, and a red Nordic cross on a white field with a rose-en-soleil at the meeting point of the arms the cross.

=== Use ===
The flag is flown within the historic boundaries of Yorkshire, including areas of east Lancashire which were formerly within the county, and is flown around the county on Yorkshire Day on 1 August. The flag was flown outside the Department for Communities and Local Government in London on Yorkshire Day in 2011 and 2013, and in Parliament Square on 23 July 2021 in order to mark Historic County Flag Day.

The kit of the Yorkshire Vikings limited overs cricket team for the 2017 season featured a stylised version of the flag, and a large version of the flag was carried onto the pitch at a County Championship match between Yorkshire and Worcestershire in Scarborough in 2018.

== Riding flags ==
=== East Riding ===
The East Riding flag

The Flag of the East Riding consists of a White Rose of York, displayed in the East Riding style with one sepal at the top, on a green and blue bicolour field. The blue is toward the hoist, representing the East Riding's connection to the rest of Yorkshire, and the green toward the fly to represent its position in the east of the historic county. The blue additionally represents the sea and the historic maritime activities of the East Riding, and the green symbolises the riding's agricultural land.

The flag was chosen in 2013 following a competition and public vote on six shortlisted finalists. The winning design was then unveiled at Beverley Minster. The flag has been flown around the East Riding. It was also flown from the building of the Department for Communities and Local Government in London in 2014.

The flag was registered by the Flag Institute, a charity which promotes vexillology in the United Kingdom, on 18 April 2013.

=== North Riding ===
The North Riding flag

The yellow edged blue cross recalls the colours (yellow stars on a blue background) of the arms attributed to the local saint, Wilfrid a major figure in the early history of the region. Set against a green field, the three colours in combination allude to the North Riding's natural features; the green representing the large tracts of the famed North York Moors National Park, while the blue and yellow reflect the North Sea coastline (with its sandy beaches at Saltburn, Runswick Bay and Redcar Beach for example) and such rivers as the Swale, Tees and Esk.

The flag was registered by the Flag Institute, a charity which promotes vexillology in the United Kingdom, on 4 May 2013.

=== West Riding ===
The West Riding flag

The Flag of the West Riding features a "rose-en-soleil" device first used by King Edward IV upon his accession to the throne, combining the White Rose of the House of York with the Sun emblem used by his royal predecessor, Richard II. In essence, the rose-en-soleil is a more elaborate version of the white rose emblem associated with the county and had been previously used by the former West Riding council in its coat of arms. The rose emblem is placed against an offset red cross in Scandinavian style, reflecting the Anglo-Scandinavian history of the region during the era when the Ridings were first established. The cross may be seen therefore as a Nordic cross in English colours, a graphic encapsulation of local heritage and history.

The flag was registered with the Flag Institute, a charity which promotes vexillology in the United Kingdom, on 23 May 2013.

=== Riding flag competition finalists ===
The finalists of the competitions to decide the flags for the ridings were:

Design	East Riding	North Riding	West Riding
A			
B			
C			
D			
E			
F			

== Council armorials ==
=== Current ===
Unitary authorities
Coat of arms	Use	Blazon and description
	East Riding of Yorkshire Council	Blazon: Barry vert and Or on a chevron engrailed plain cotised gules three roses argent barbed and seeded proper. Crest: issuing from a mural crown argent an eagle displayed gules armed and langued azure supporting with the dexter talons a sword hilt upwards and with the sinister talons a crozier in saltire Or; mantled gules doubled argent. Supporters: on the dexter a lion azure guardant armed and langued gules gorged with a wreath of barley supporting between the forelegs a trident Or; on the sinister a demi-horse argent langued gules maned Or the feet webbed vert conjoined to the lower half of a Hippocampus vert supporting between the forelegs set upon a staff a cross fleury gules. The arms were granted in 1996.
	Hull City Council	Blazon: Azure three Ducal Coronets in pale Or. The arms were recorded without tinctures in heraldic visitations in 1612 and 1665/66. Their tinctures were certified in 1879, and confirmed by the College of Arms in February 1951.
	Middlesbrough Council	Blazon Argent a Lion rampant Azure on a Chief Sable an Estoile between two Ships Or sails Argent. Crest: Upon a Mural Crown Or a Lion passant Azure supporting with the dexter fore paw an Anchor Gold; Mantled Azure doubled Argent. The arms were granted in 1976.
	North Yorkshire Council	Blazon: Argent a bendlet wavy azure and a bendlet sinister wavy vert over all on a cross gules five roses argent barbed and seeded proper. Crest: On a wreath argent and azure upon a mural crown gules a lion passant guardant Or supporting with the dexter forepaw a rose argent barbed and seeded proper en soleil. Supporters: Upon a compartment of a heather moor proper on the dexter a lion Or holding in the sinister forepaw a sword argent hilt pomel and quillons gules and resting the sinister hindpaw on a fountain on the sinister a lion Or holding in the dexter forepaw two keys in saltire argent and resting the dexter hindpaw on a serpent coiled proper. The arms were granted 29 April 1980.
	Redcar and Cleveland Borough Council	Blazon: Azure in front of two Pick-Axes in saltire heads upwards a representation of the Prison Gate as appears on the Seal of the Wapentake of Langbaurgh proper in chief six Fleur-de-Lys Or. Crest: On a Wreath of the Colours upon Water barry wavy Argent and Azure between two Rocks proper a Clipper Ship in full sail all proper pennons Azure. Supporters: Upon a Compartment composed of a Mount Vert on the dexter side a Lion Or maned Argent gorged with a Chain dependant therefrom a Roundel Azure charged with a Glass Chemistry Flask proper showing liquid Gules on the sinister side a Cleveland Bay Horse proper gorged with a Chain dependant thereform a Roundel Azure charged with Steel Ingot proper.
	Stockton-on-Tees Borough Council	Blazon: Barry wavy of six Argent and Azure overall a Chevron Pean. Crest: On a Wreath Argent and Sable a Gateway embattled between two Towers Or the Portcullis raised Sable enfilling the portal an Anchor erect Gules; Mantled Azure double Argent. Supporters: On the dexter a Lion guardant and on the sinister a Sealion also guardant all Or. The arms were granted on 4 August 1976.
	City of York Council	Blazon: Argent on a Cross Gules five Lions passant guardant Or. The arms were recorded without tinctures at a heraldic visitation in 1584.

Metropolitan borough councils
Coat of arms	Use	Blazon and description
South Yorkshire
	Barnsley Metropolitan Borough Council	Blazon: Argent on a Chevron Gules between two Shuttles fessewise in chief and in base as many Pickaxes in saltire proper a Falcon wings elevated and holding in the dexter claw a Padlock Or between two Boar's Heads couped of the last each holding in the mouth a Cross patee fitchee in pale of the first a Chief Sable thereon a Cross patee between two Covered Cups all within a Bordure embattled Or. Crest: On a Wreath of the Colours a Gryphon Argent wings elevated Sable resting the dexter claw on an Escarpuncle of fourteen points Gules. Supporters: On the dexter side a Glass-Blower supporting in his exterior hand a Blow-Pipe issuant therefrom in base a Glass Bottle and on the sinister side a Miner his.Pit Lamp suspended from his neck supporting in his exterior hand a Pick-Axe proper all upon a Compartment composed of a Grassy Mount to the dexter and a Pile of Coal to the sinister all proper.
	City of Doncaster Council	Blazon: Per pale Sable and Vert issuant from barry wavy of four in base Argent and Azure a Port between two Towers each with a conical cap ensigned by a ball the Portcullis raised between eight Roses three three and two Argent barbed and seeded proper. Crest: On a Wreath of the Colours upon the Battlements of a Tower an Owl Argent gorged with a collar company Or and Azure between two Branches of Oak issuant each having four leaves and fructed of four Acorns proper. Supporters: On either side a Lion sejant Or that on the dexter gorged with a representation of the device of British Rail Gules pendent therefrom a Miner's Safety Lamp proper that on the sinister gorged with a Flash of Lightning Azure pendent therefrom by the ring an Anchor Sable. The arms were granted on 1 September 1975.
	Rotherham Metropolitan Borough Council	Blazon: Vert on a Fess wavy between in chief a Mitre between two Roses Argent barbed and seeded proper and in base a Cogwheel Argent a Bar wavy Sable. Crest: On a Wreath of the Colours a demi-Horse Sable resting its dexter hoof upon a Cogwheel proper. Supporters: On the dexter a Buck and on the sinister a Griffin Or each charged upon the neck with a Bar wavy Sable.
	Sheffield City Council	Blazon: Per fesse Azure and Vert in chief eight Arrows interlaced saltirewise banded Argent and in base three Garbs fessewise Or. Crest: On a Wreath of the Colours a Lion rampant Argent gorged with a Collar and holding between the paws an Antique Shield Azure charged with eight Arrows as in the Arms. Supporters: On the dexter side a figure habited as Thor resting his exterior hand on a Hammer all proper and on the sinister side a figure habited as Vulcan standing in front of an Anvil and in the dexter hand a pair of Pincers all also proper. The arms and crest were granted on 26 July 1875 and the supporters granted on 31 August 1893. The arms were transferred to the current borough council on 1 September 1977.
West Yorkshire
	City of Bradford Metropolitan District Council	Blazon: Per pale Gules and Azure on a Chevron engrailed between in chief two Buglehorns stringed and in base a Fleece Or a Fountain the whole within a Bordure gobony of the first and Argent charged on the Gules with eleven Roses of the last barbed and seeded proper. Crest: Upon a Mural Crown per pale Gules and Azure a Boar's Head sans Tongue erased Or; Mantled Azure and Gules doubled Or. Supporters: On the dexter side a Stag Or gorged with a Collar Azure thereon three Roses Argent barbed and seeded proper and on the sinister side an Angora Goat Argent horned Or gorged with a Collar Gules charged with three like Roses.
	Calderdale Metropolitan Borough Council	Blazon: Vert a Paschal Lamb proper supporting over the shoulder a Cross Staff Or flying therefrom a forked Pennon of St. George between in chief a Bar wavy Argent charged with a Barruret wavy Azure and in base a Rose Argent barbed and seeded proper. Crest: On a Wreath Argent and Vert out of a Mural Crown a Rose Tree of nine branches proper each terminating in a Rose Argent barbed and seeded proper. Supporters: On either side a Lion Or gorged with a collar wavy Azure and holding aloft in the interior forepaw a Crescent Sable.
	Kirklees Council	Blazon: Vert on a Bend Argent a Bendlet wavy Azure on a Chief Or a Pale between two Cog-Wheels Azure on the Pale a Pascal Lamb supporting a Staff Or flying therefrom a forked Pennon Argent charged with a Cross Gules. Crest: On a Wreath of the Colours a Ram's Head affronty couped Argent armed Or gorged with a Mural Crown Sable masoned Argent. Supporters: On either side a Lion rampant guardant Purpure resting the inner hind leg on a Cross Crosslet Or embellished in each of the four angles with a Fleur de Lis Azure. The arms were granted on 24 June 1974.
	Leeds City Council	Blazon: Azure a Fleece Or on a Chief Sable three Mullets Argent. Crest: On a Wreath of the Colours an Owl proper. Supporters: On either side an Owl proper ducally crowned Or. The arms were recorded at an heraldic visitation in 1666, and the crest and supporters granted on 7 November 1921.
	Wakefield Council	Blazon: Lozengy Or and Sable each Lozenge Sable charged with a Mural Crown Or a Canton Azure charged with a Fleur-de-Lys Or fimbriated Ermine. Crest: On a Wreath of the Colours an eagle reguardant Or the undersides of the wings lozengy Or and Vert with a chain around its body and holding in the dexter claw a Miner's Pickaxe proper. Supporters: On the dexter a Dray Horse with Pack Saddle and Harness proper and on the sinister an Eagle Or crowned with a Wreath of Laurel proper all on a Compartment of a Grassy Mount strewn with thirteen Acorns Or. The arms were granted in 1990.

=== Former ===
==== Administrative county councils ====
Between 1889 and 1974 the three ridings were administrative counties. Each council was eventually granted arms by the officers at the College of Arms, which were used until their abolition.

Coat of arms	Use	Blazon and description
	North Riding County Council	Blazon:Argent a cross gules; on a chief azure three roses argent barbed and seeded proper. Granted 1 March 1928, but used unofficially from 1889.
	West Riding County Council	Blazon:Ermine a rose argent, barbed and seeded proper and en soleil Or; on a chief gules three roses of the second barbed and seeded proper. The arms ensigned by a mural crown Or.
	East Riding County Council	Blazon:Per chevron argent and Or, in chief two garbs proper and in base an eagle displayed azure; on a chief sable three roses argent barbed and seeded proper. Crest: on a wreath of the colours, on a garb fessewise Or an eagle displayed azure. Granted 28 February 1945.

==== Metropolitan and non-metropolitan county councils ====
The Local Government Act 1972 replaced the three administrative counties with the metropolitan counties of South Yorkshire and West Yorkshire and the non-metropolitan counties of Cleveland, Humberside, and North Yorkshire. They came into being on 1 April 1974, and all five were granted arms in the next four years.

On 1 April 1986 the two metropolitan county councils were abolished under the Local Government Act 1985 and their functions transferred primarily to the metropolitan districts of each county. On 1 April 1996 the non-metropolitan counties of Cleveland and Humberside and their county councils were abolished.

Coat of arms	Use	Blazon and description
	Cleveland County Council	Blazon: Argent a Lion rampant Azure crowned Or and gorged with a Collar compony Ermine and Or breathing Flames proper on a Chief wavy Azure on a Pale Sable fimbriated between on the dexter a Cogwheel and on the sinister a voided Hexagon Argent an ancient Ship sails furled pennons flying Or. Crest: On a Wreath of the Colours on a Grassy Mount an Anchor proper between two Estoiles Or. Supporters: On the dexter side a Hart Or and on the sinister side a Cleveland Bay Horse proper both gorged with a Collar compony Ermine and Azure and resting their interior hind hooves on three Ingots of Steel proper the whole upon a Compartment per pale of a Grassy Mount and Waves of the Sea proper. The arms were granted on 10 December 1974. With the abolition of the county council in 1996 they became obsolete.
	Humberside County Council	Blazon: Per fess Sable and Gules on a Fess wavy Argent between in chief a Coronet Or between two Roses Argent barbed and seeded proper and in base two Fleurs de Lis Or a Bar wavy Azure. Crest: On a Wreath Or and Gules rising from Flames proper a demi-Eagle Azure Goutté d'Or armed also Gold holding in the beak a Sword point downwards proper hilt and pommel Or. Supporters: On the dexter a Dolphin Argent finned Or charged on the shoulder with a Terrestrial Globe Azure the land masses Or supporting an Anchor proper and on the sinister a Female Figure habited representing Ceres with Cornucopia all proper upon a Compartment per pale Water barry wavy Azure and Argent and a Grassy Field proper. The arms were granted on 28 July 1976. With the abolition of the county council in 1996 they became obsolete.
	West Yorkshire County Council	Blazon: Or two piles azure a rose argent barbed and seeded proper. Crest: on a wreath of the colours a mural crown Or standing thereon a lion rampant guardant per fess gules and tenné crowned Or bearing in its forepaws a rose argent barbed and seeded proper. Supporters: Dexter a lion rampant guardant per fess gules and sable armed and langued azure crowned and charged on the shoulder with a sun in splendour Or sinister a lion rampant guardant per fess tenné and vert armed and langued gules crowned Or charged on the shoulder with a rose argent barbed and seeded proper, the whole upon a compartment representing the Pennine Hills. The arms were granted on 22 August 1975. With the abolition of the county council in 1986 they became obsolete.
	South Yorkshire County Council	Blazon: Sable a pile throughout barry dancetty argent and gules over all a pile reversed throughout counterchanged in the sable a rose argent barbed and seeded proper between two like roses dimidiated and issuing from the flanks. Crest: Issuant from a mural crown gules a rose argent barbed and seeded proper dimidiating a bezant. Supporter: Dexter a horse guardant Or crined and unguled sable supporting with the dexter forehoof a hoe gules sinister a lion guardant sable maned Or supporting a miner's pick-axe gules. The arms were granted in 1978. With the abolition of the county council in 1986 they arms became obsolete.

== British Army ==
Symbol	Use	Description
	Yorkshire Regiment	Tactical Recognition Flash of the Yorkshire Regiment of the British Army

== Maritime flags ==
=== Yacht and sailing clubs ===
Symbol	Use	Description
	Humber Yawl Club	Burgee of the Humber Yawl Club, based in Brough, East Riding of Yorkshire (as well as in Winteringham, Lincolnshire).
	Pirate Yacht Club	Burgee of the short-lived Pirate Yacht Club (c. 1898–1908), based in Bridlington.
	Royal Yorkshire Yacht Club	Ensign and burgee of the Royal Yorkshire Yacht Club, established in 1847.

=== Shipping companies ===
Symbol	Use	Description
	North Yorkshire Shipping Company	House flag of the North Yorkshire Shipping Company, in use from c. 1956–1973.

== See also ==
- Flying Colours Flagmakers company based in North Yorkshire
- List of English flags
- National symbols of England
