= Flag of Merionethshire =

Historic Welsh county flag

Merionethshire
- Proportion: 3:5
- Adopted: 2 January 2015
- Design: Azure, three goats rampant Argent, armed and unguled Or; from the dexter base the sun in his splendour issuant Or
- Designed by: Traditional

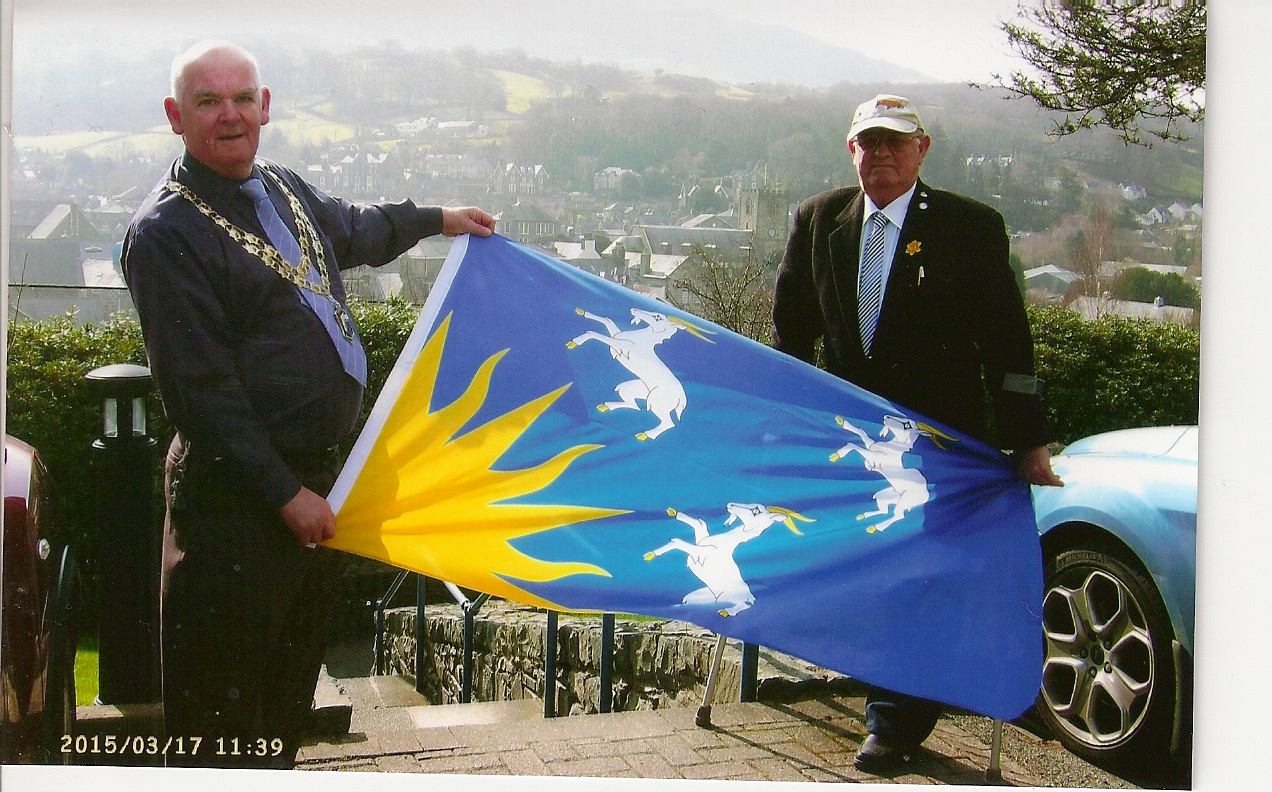
The county flag of Merionethshire in the hands of the Mayor of the county town, Dolgellau, Delwyn Evans, left and Councillor Ray Stubbs.

The Merionethshire flag (Welsh: Baner Sir Feirionnydd) is the flag of the historic Welsh county of Merioneth. It was registered with the Flag Institute as the official flag of the county on 2 January 2015.

== Design ==
The flag features three goats rampant, and on the lower hoist (bottom left) is the corner of the sun in yellow, all on a blue field. In other words, it is “Azure, three goats rampant Argent, armed and unguled Or; from the dexter base the sun in his splendour issuant Or”. It is in a 3:5 ratio.

=== Colours ===
The pantone colours of the flag are:

Scheme	Blue	Blue	White	Yellow
Pantone (paper)	286 C	282 C	Safe	116
HEX	#0033a0	#041e42	#FFFFFF	#FFCD00
CMYK	100, 68, 0, 37	94, 55, 0, 74	0, 0, 0, 0	0, 10, 98, 0
RGB	0, 51, 161	4, 30, 66	255, 255, 255	255, 205, 0

== History ==
The design is adapted from the seal used by the former county council. This in turn derived from the anachronistic description of a banner borne by the men of Merioneth at the Battle of Agincourt, in the 17th-century poem of the same name by Michael Drayton. (Note: A small number of Welshmen were part of the 1415 army, but Chapman notes the lack of contemporary reference to any Welsh contingent at Agincourt, in either English and Welsh literature. The number present must have been small enough, he suggests, that "in no way did [they] predominate". Chapman also notes that Glyndŵr Rising against Henry IV of England had been ongoing for a decade and had only recently petered out; "in this light", he comments, "it might be wondered that any Welshmen fought with Henry V in 1415".) Here he wrote of “three goats dancing "gainst a rising sun"; the shield was blue, the sun golden and the goats white. Speculation regarding this unusual arrangement suggests a connection with Cader Idris, where goats browsed and behind which the sun rose. The flag therefore both maintains a theme associated with Merioneth for six centuries and is also a highly distinctive design – no other officially used flag features a sun in this position and the arrangement is uniquely Merioneth.

The local running club, Clwb Rhedeg Meirionnydd, who used the design of three goats as their emblem, advocated for the flag to be officially adopted. This was in light of official adoption of old symbols for flags by the neighbouring counties of Caernarfonshire, and so the club contacted the Flag Institute to propose its adoption, and it was duly registered.

It is popularly flown all around the county.

== See also ==
- Chapman, A. (2011). "The King's Welshmen: Welsh Involvement in the Expeditionary Army of 1415". Journal of Medieval Military History. 9: 41–64.
