= Flying Colours Flagmakers =

Flagmakers based in North Yorkshire, England

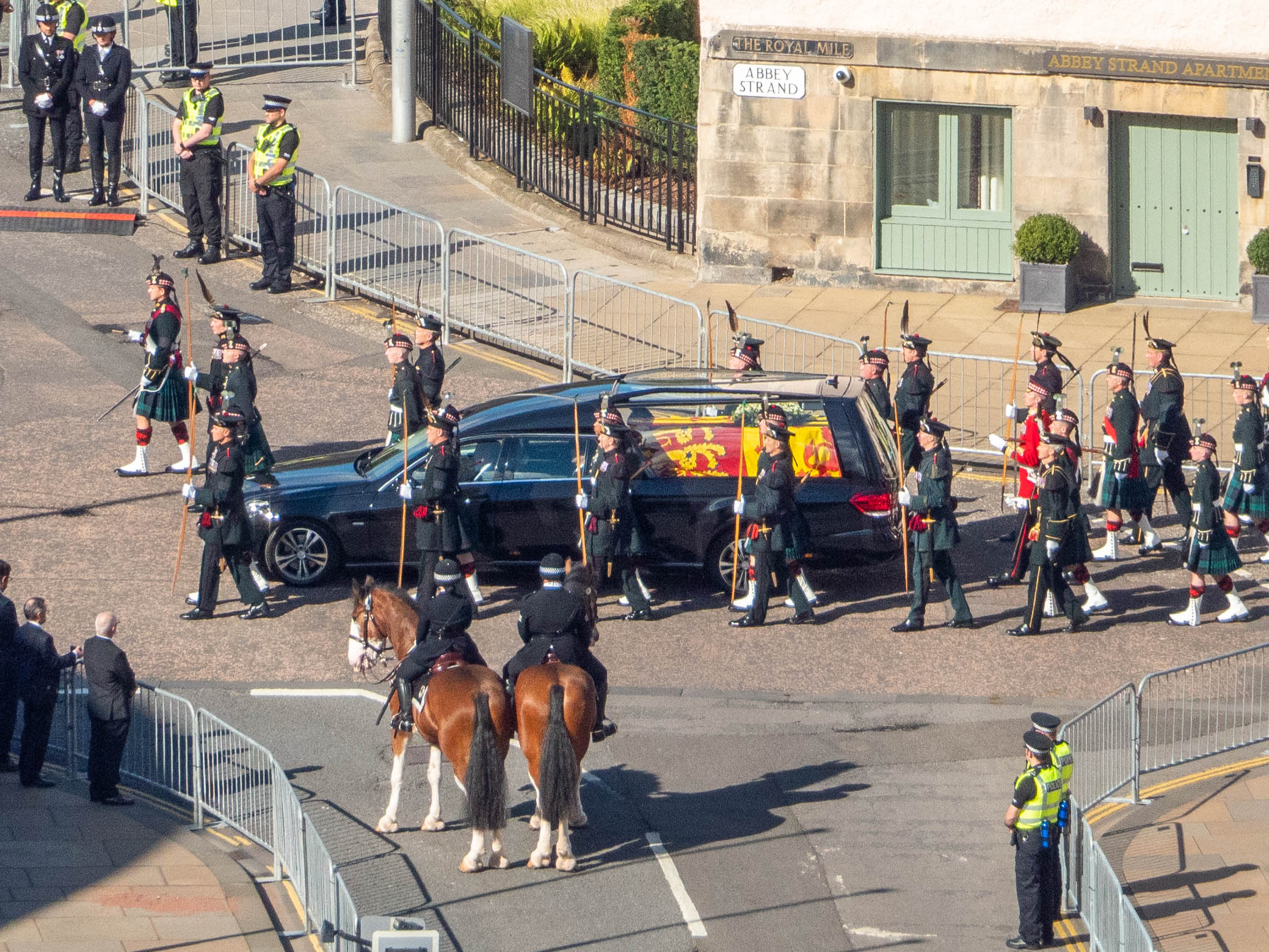
- Elizabeth II's coffin leaves Holyrood Palace
- Type: Private
- Industry: Flagmaking
- Founded: 1994
- Headquarters: Knaresborough, North Yorkshire, England
- Revenue: £300,000 (2010)
- Number of employees: 18 (2022)
- Website: Official website

Flying Colours Flagmakers are a company based in Knaresborough, North Yorkshire, England, who specialise in flags and standards. The company have been operating since 1994, and in 2022, one of their flags ordered by the Royal Household, adorned the coffin of Queen Elizabeth II whilst it was lying in state in St Giles Cathedral in Edinburgh, Scotland.

== History ==
The company was founded in 1994, first making flags and standards for the Royal Household in 2000. In 2007, the company was awarded a Royal Warrant, and is only one of six flagmakers who are registered with the United Kingdom Flag Institute. One of the flags they have made for the Royal Household, a Union Flag, measuring 38 feet (12 m) by 19 feet (5.8 m) and the largest in the United Kingdom, is regularly flown from Windsor Castle.

The company have produced over 10,000 different types of flags in one of three styles; printed, appliqué, and sewn. The company has been based in Knaresborough since its inception, and now employs 18 people. The company makes many flags for yachts, the Ministry of Defence, and some short-term flags such as rainbow flags during the COVID-19 pandemic and those showing solidarity for Ukraine after the Russian invasion.

In 2012, demand for their products during Queen Elizabeth's Diamond Jubilee saw production increase fourfold. The most notable example of one of their flags was the Royal Standard of Scotland which they made in 2021 for the Royal Household, and was used in September 2022 to adorn the coffin of Queen Elizabeth II whilst it was lying in state at St Giles Cathedral in Edinburgh, as part of the funeral of the Queen. The company stated that this flag was manufactured without the fittings necessary for it to be hoisted on a flagpole, meaning that it was ordered as a coffin drape.

Flags made by Flying Colours Flagmakers have been flown in the Arctic, the Antarctic (on RRS Sir David Attenborough), on Everest, Kilimanjaro, and down to one of the deepest trenches of the oceans when it was a table flag being displayed in a Royal Navy submarine. The company's flags have also appeared on screen in the Fast and Furious 9, the X-Men series, and The Death of Stalin on film, and in The Crown and Gunpowder on television. Flags for The Crown have been made for the programme since series one, and are all historically correct.
