= Royal Naval Sailing Association =

Governing body of sailing in the UK

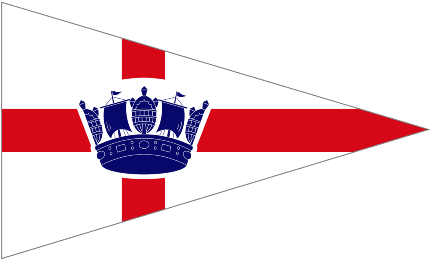
- Burgee

- Ensign
- Short name: RNSA
- Founded: 1935; 91 years ago
- Location: Haslar Marina, Gosport, Hampshire, England
- Commodore: General Sir Gwyn Jenkins
- Focus: Service Sports Association
- Website: https://www.rnsa.org.uk

The Royal Naval Sailing Association (RNSA) is the governing body that oversees all aspects of sailing, both racing and recreational sailing cruises, throughout the British Royal Navy. The RNSA is a Service Sports Association, and is also the advisor to the Navy Board on sailing matters. It administers the Bosun dinghy as a one-design sailing class.

The Royal Naval Sailing Association was founded in 1935; 91 years ago, four years before the outbreak of the Second World War. It is headquartered at Haslar Marina, Gosport in Hampshire, England.

== Aims of the Association ==
The aims of the Royal Naval Sailing Association are:

- To encourage and organise sailing and cruising throughout the Royal Navy, and amongst the many members who have left the Service.
- To stimulate the design and construction of craft suitable for members.
- To organise Branches and Units throughout the Service (Naval Air, British Columbia, Clyde, Dartmouth, East Coast, Forth, Fleet, Medway, Plymouth, Portland, Portsmouth, Royal Marines, and Royal Australian Naval Sailing Association).
- To encourage and promote liaison with other sailing organisations.
- To organise and maintain berthing facilities for members wherever possible.
- To co-ordinate racing within and outside the Service.
- To administer the Bosun dinghy as a one-design class.

== Membership ==
=== Full Membership ===
At the Royal Naval Sailing Association there is two categories of membership. Full members are serving or retired personnel of the Royal Navy, Royal Marines, Royal Fleet Auxiliary or Commonwealth or Allied Naval forces, including members from the Royal Naval Reserve, Royal Marines Reserve and naval cadet forces instructors. Full members are entitled to fly the undefaced Blue Ensign and the association's burgee, with the red cross.

=== Associate Membership ===
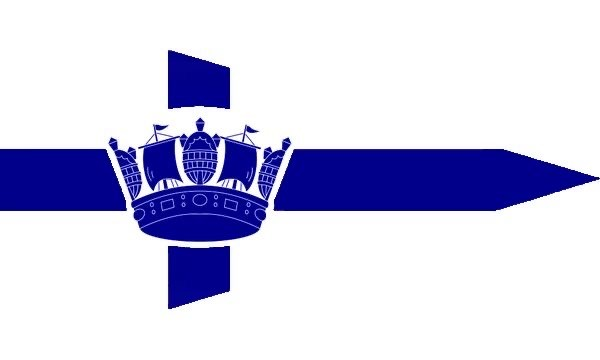
Branch Burgee denoting an Associate member of the Royal Naval Sailing Association. Flown with the Red Ensign.

Associate membership of the Royal Naval Sailing Association are for personnel that is serving or have retired from the British Army, Royal Air Force or Civil Service, in particular civil servants working in the Ministry of Defence. Also entitled to be an associate of the association are descendants of member in the RNSA. Associates of the RNSA fly the burgee with the blue cross and an undefaced Red Ensign.

== Flag Officers ==
The senior most members of the Sailing Association fly another flag, broad pennant or burgee aboard their vessel in order to distinguish themselves on the water. The designs of the burgee and flag officer's flag, broad pennants and burgees was designed in 1936 by Commander Harry Vanderwell R.N.V.R. and later approved by the Admiralty.

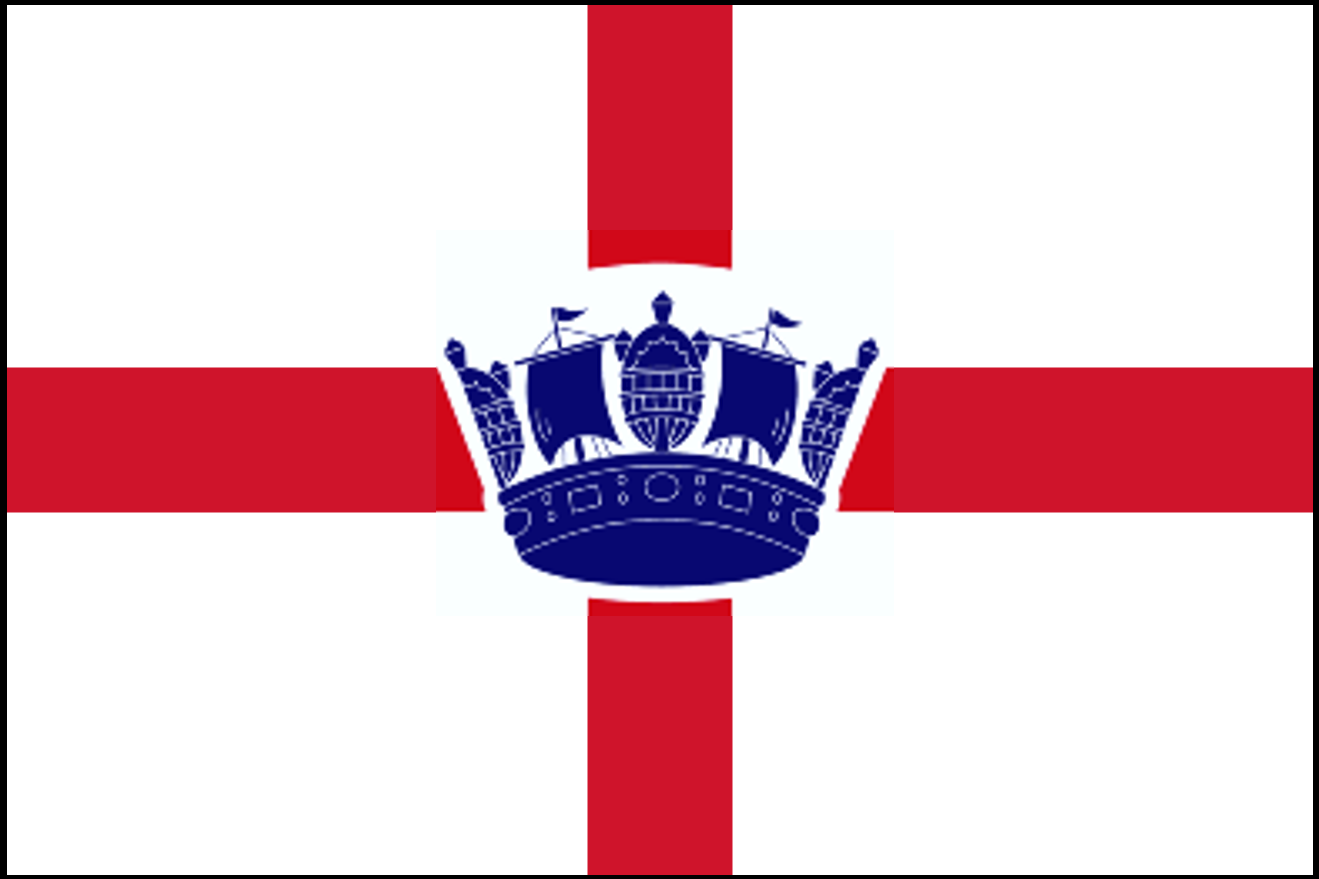
Admiral

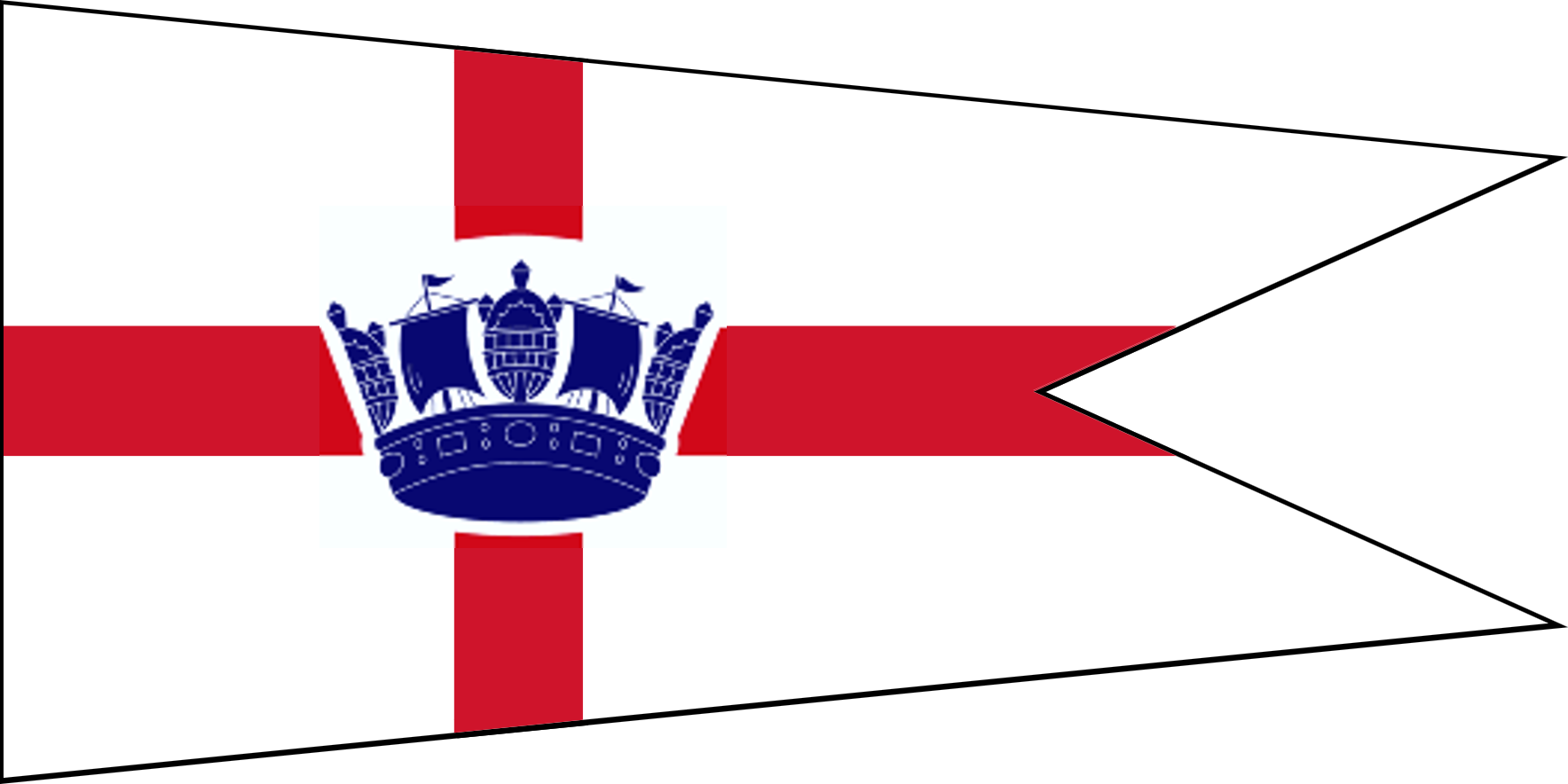
Commodore

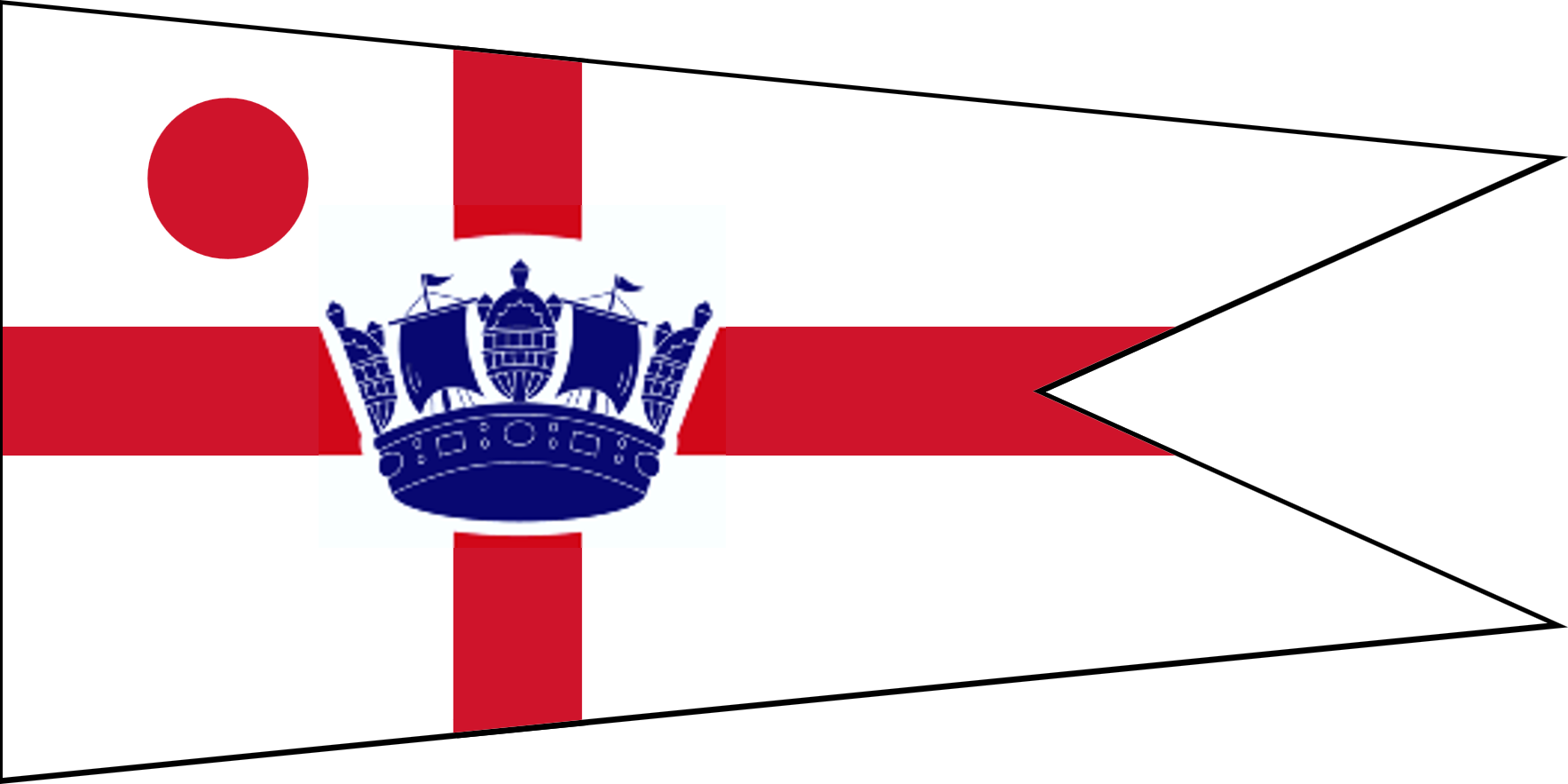
Vice Commodore

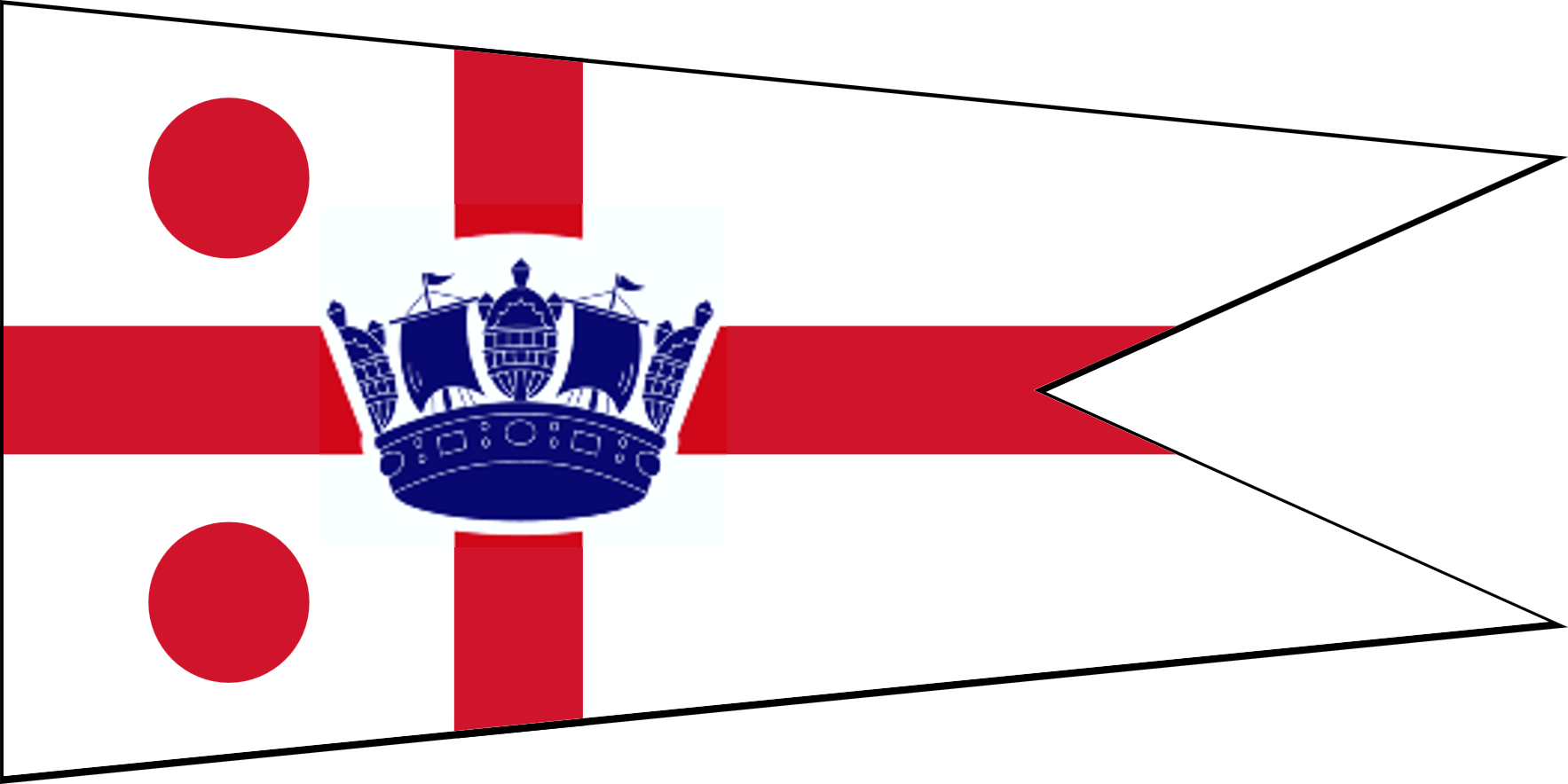
Rear Commodore

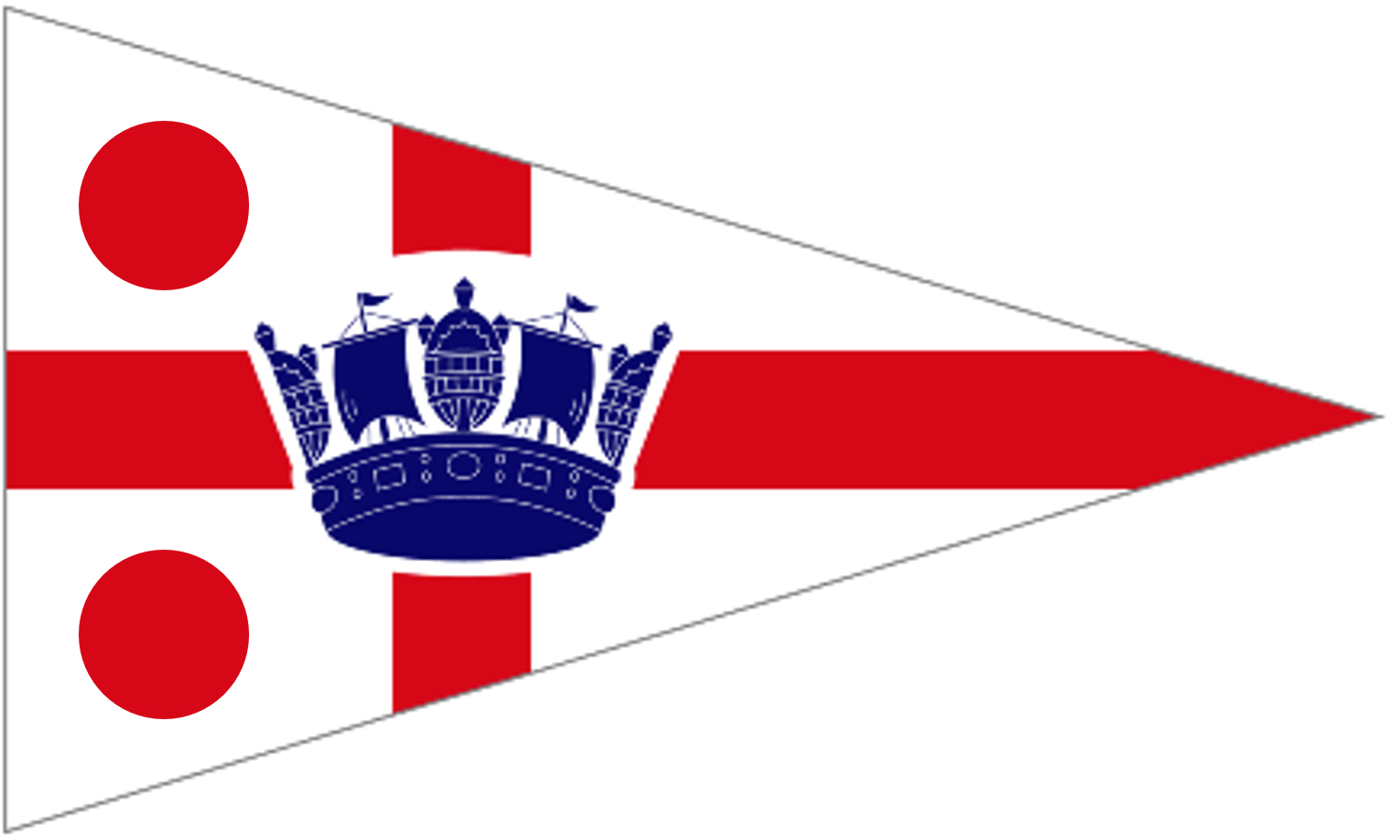
Branch Captain
