= Royal Dart Yacht Club =

- Burgee

- Ensign
- Short name: RDYC
- Founded: 8 June 1866; 160 years ago
- Location: Kingswear, Devon, England
- Commodore: Tim Wiltshire
- Website: www.royaldart.co.uk

The Royal Dart Yacht Club (RDYC) is a yacht club based at Kingswear, on the River Dart in Devon, England.

== History ==
The club was founded as the Dart Yacht Club on 8 June 1866, following a meeting at the Castle Hotel, Dartmouth, led by Henry Studdy and other local supporters of yachting. Its first base was on the Kingswear side of the River Dart, where rooms were hired in the railway hotel for club use.

In 1870 the club petitioned Queen Victoria for permission to adopt the title Royal Dart Yacht Club. Approval was granted in time for the 1873 regatta. Membership expanded rapidly in the late 19th century, and a purpose-built clubhouse was completed in 1881. Women were first elected to membership in 1894, although later rule changes excluded them for a period; restrictions on the movement of female members within the clubhouse were not removed until 1959.

After early growth, membership declined towards the end of the 19th century and fell sharply during the First World War, reaching a low point in 1918 when the club faced a serious financial crisis. The club recovered in the inter-war years and acquired the freehold of its premises in 1921. The 1937 Coronation Regatta attracted 313 entries in 17 classes.

During the 20th century, dinghy sailing became increasingly important to the club. Its development was influenced by figures including Vernon McAndrew and Lloyd Prichard, who helped expand small-boat racing and youth participation in the 1930s. After the Second World War, the club adapted to changing patterns of recreational sailing by supporting one-design dinghy racing, improving access and mooring facilities, and creating space for shore-based dinghies. In 1959 it launched Junior Sailing Week, which became a longstanding part of its youth sailing programme.

Local newspapers also reported on club innovations in 1932, coastal events in 1950, efforts to broaden participation in 1952, refurbishment of the clubhouse in 1974, and further redevelopment in 1991.
