= Royal Naval Volunteer Reserve Yacht Club =

Service yacht club in the United Kingdom

Royal Naval Sailing Association
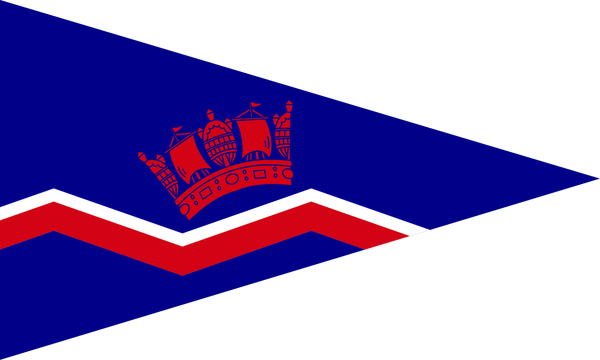
- Burgee

- Ensign
- Short name: RNVRYC
- Founded: 1947; 79 years ago
- Website: https://www.rnvryc.org/

The Royal Navy Volunteer Reserve Yacht Club (RNVRYC) is a Yacht club recognised as a Service Yacht Club in the United Kingdom.

The Royal Navy Volunteer Reserve Yacht Club was founded in 1947, two years after the Second World War reached its conclusion.

The Yacht club has a warrant to wear the UK's special undefaced Blue Ensign.

== History ==
The organisation was founded by members of the Royal Naval Volunteer Reserve in 1947, having developed from the Sailing Section of the RNVR Officers Club.

Its initial activity, from 1947, involved teams racing against various other clubs and naval establishments. In 1949 the Club presented to the RYA a silver cup for an annual competition of Fireflies.

In recent years many members have acquired their own boats and, since 1976, annual meets for members have been held.

In 2017, the RNVRYC hosted a day of dinghy sailing to celebrate its 70th year. The event aimed to bring together members and former members of the Royal Navy, Royal Marines, Royal Naval Reserve, and Royal Marines Reserve and their families.
