= Humber Yawl Club =

- Burgee

- Ensign
- Short name: HYC
- Founded: 1883
- Location: Brough, East Riding of Yorkshire and Winteringham, Lincolnshire
- Website: https://www.humberyawlclub.com/

The Humber Yawl Club is a yawl club founded in 1883 and so is one of England's oldest sailing clubs. It was founded on the banks of the Humber Estuary at Brough Haven. The mainstays of the club in its formative years were Albert Strange and George Holmes. The club currently has more than 200 members, and holds annual events including a regatta and the Winteringham Weekend.

The Humber Yawl Club is one of a few sailing clubs in the United Kingdom to be led by a captain and mate rather than a commodore. This was done to emphasise the informal style of the club —a rough-hewn northern Viking style, in contrast to the mannered style of the Royal Yacht Squadron.
