= Royal Fowey Yacht Club =

Coordinates: 50.33441°N 4.63603°W

- Burgee

- Ensign
- Short name: RFYC
- Founded: 1880
- Location: Fowey, Cornwall
- Website: http://www.rfyc-fowey.org.uk

The Royal Fowey Yacht Club is located in a waterfront setting at Fowey, on the south coast of Cornwall one of the UK's most secure harbours.

Its antecedents can be traced back to 1880; its third Honorary Secretary, from 1893, was Arthur Quiller-Couch, who became Sir Arthur. The minutes and descriptions of Yacht races, up to 1897 are in his handwriting. Sir Arthur Quiller-Couch filled the post of Commodore from 1911 until 1944 when he was succeeded by Lt. General Sir Frederick Browning, who upon retirement in 1962, was elected the Club's first Admiral. The Queen and the Duke of Edinburgh were his personal friends, and visited the Club from the RY Britannia, visiting also him and his wife, the author Daphne du Maurier, at their home at Menabilly, (which became "Manadalay" in her book, "Rebecca").

In 1905 permission was granted for the Club to include in its insignia the Coronet of the Duke of Cornwall over the Shield of the Duchy of Cornwall and in 1907 the King approved the use of the prefix "Royal" in the name of the Club.
