= Royal Victoria Yacht Club (England) =

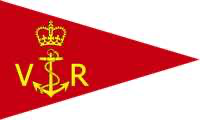
- Burgee

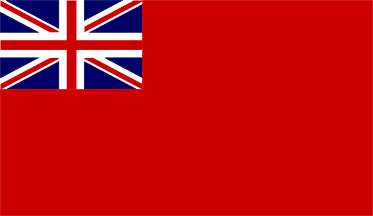
- Ensign 1845-1872

- Ensign 1872-1898

- Ensign from 1898
- Short name: RVYC
- Founded: 1845
- commodore: Chris Rickman
- Location: Fishbourne, Isle of Wight
- website: www.rvyc.org.uk

The Royal Victoria Yacht Club was founded at Ryde, on the Isle of Wight and uniquely granted 'Royal' status immediately. In 1845 the club was granted a warrant to wear the Red Ensign of HM Fleet. From 1872 until 1898 the club held the warrant to wear the crown defaced Red Ensign. It currently holds the warrant for its defaced ensign. It is the second club of that name, succeeding a failed club on the Thames and preceding its namesake in Canada by nearly fifty years. It was once regarded as one of the premier yacht racing clubs of the world. In 1961, after two world wars and the decline in yacht racing as the preserve of the wealthy, the Royal Victoria amalgamated with two local dinghy sailing clubs and moved its base to Fishbourne on Wootton Creek, some five miles (8.0 km) west of Ryde where it remains.

It is said that the club was formed by Prince Albert to give Queen Victoria a yacht club which she was entitled to enter as a mere female. Prince Albert was clearly involved in the formation of the club as were local businessmen and active yachtsmen. The Prince had no reputation as a yachtsman. The first royal yacht had been launched two years earlier, owned and managed by the Royal Navy. In the year that the RVYC was formed the Queen and Prince Albert had started to build their summer home on the Isle of Wight. They became the nearby RVYC's first patrons at its genesis. There is no record of Victoria having entered the club. Much later in Victoria's reign her relations with the club became strained and she withdrew her patronage. It was not until the AGM of 1869 that a proposal was passed to allow "...Ladies to have Club privileges afloat as Club members but not to make use of the Club House" to cater for the growing fashion amongst wealthy women cruising and racing in their own right.

The town of Ryde was then developing into a fashionable resort and the sport of yacht racing was expanding from racing on the Thames under the auspices of the Cumberland Fleet to the Isle of Wight and the Solent. The Royal Yacht Squadron had developed an annual regatta at Cowes and the Royal Victoria went on to develop an annual regatta at Ryde to take place immediately after the Cowes regatta. This extended the developing Solent yacht racing season to two weeks. As the sport grew so this trend continued. The foundation of the Royal Albert Yacht Club at Southsea (1865) led to the extension of the racing season by a further week.

Many of the members of the Royal Yacht Squadron became members also of the Royal Victoria. The club was sometimes referred to as the 'Red Squadron'.

== Club House ==
On 2 March 1846, at Ryde, the foundation-stone of the original clubhouse was ceremonially laid by Queen Victoria and the Prince Consort.

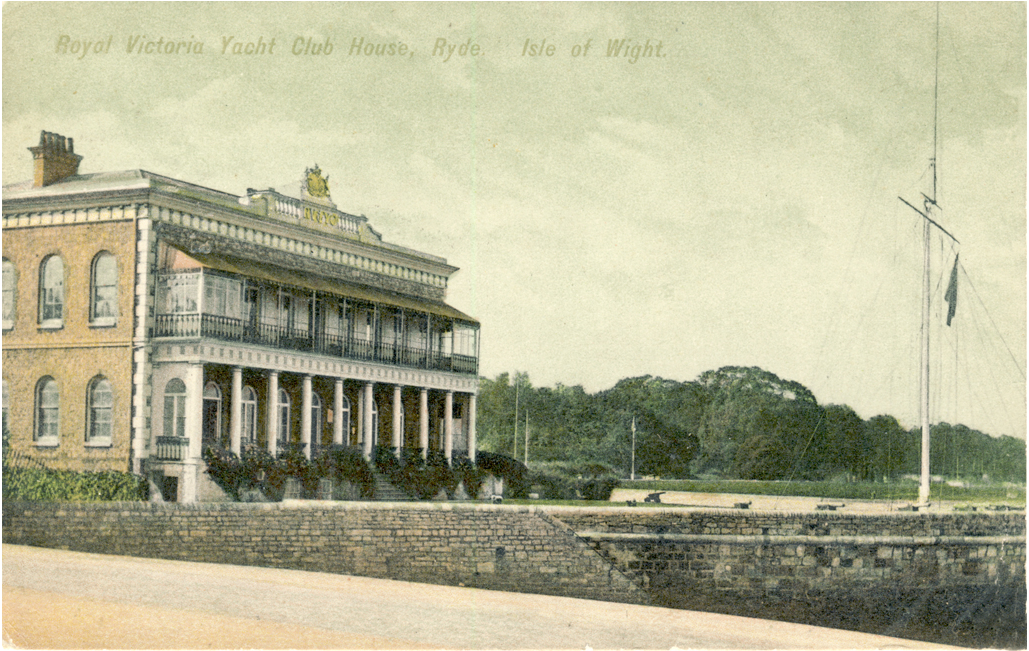
RVYC, Ryde, 1909
