= Royal Forth Yacht Club =

- Burgee

- Ensign
- Short name: RFYC
- Founded: 1868
- Location: Granton Harbour, Edinburgh, Midlothian, Scotland
- Commodore: Michael A. C. Tasker
- Website: www.royalforth.org

The Royal Forth Yacht Club was founded in 1868 as the Granton Yacht Club. It held its first regatta in 1869, and changed its name in 1872 to the Forth Yacht Club. It received the Royal honorific from Queen Victoria in 1883. The name had previously been used by the Eastern Regatta Club of Scotland, which had been founded in 1835 with the Duke of Buccleuch as Commodore and had become the Royal Forth Yacht Club in 1836.
