= Royal Norfolk and Suffolk Yacht Club =

Coordinates: 52.4720°N 1.7503°E

- Burgee

- Ensign
- Short name: RNSYC
- Founded: 1859
- Location: Royal Plain, Lowestoft
- Website: http://www.rnsyc.net

Royal Norfolk and Suffolk Yacht Club
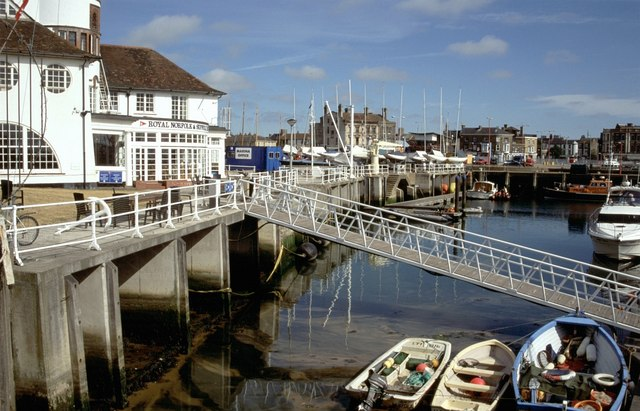

- Location within Suffolk
- Location: Lowestoft, Suffolk, England

Listed Building – Grade II*
- Official name: Royal Norfolk and Suffolk Yacht Club
- Designated: 2 May 1979
- Reference no.: 1207043

The Royal Norfolk and Suffolk Yacht Club is a private yacht club based in Lowestoft, Suffolk, England. It was founded on 16 April 1859 and the first club house was constructed in 1866 but was undersized. The current club house was designed by George Skipper and built between 1902 and 1903, in 2006 it was restored. It was Grade II* listed on 2 May 1979.
