= Church of St Candida and Holy Cross =

St Candida and Holy Cross
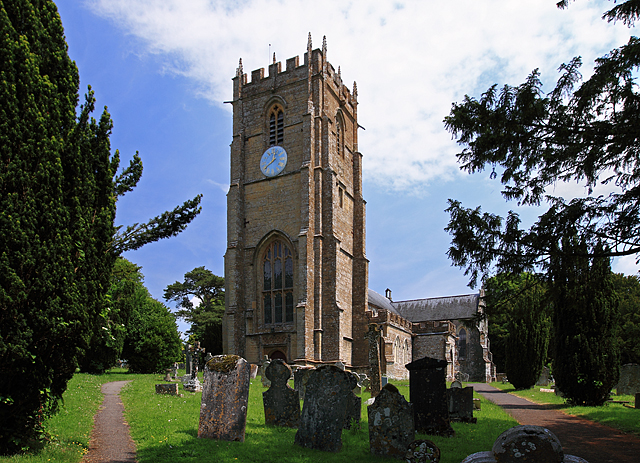
- St Candida and Holy Cross from the west

- Location within Dorset
- 50.7554°N 2.8565°W
- OS grid reference: SY 39681 95442
- Location: Whitchurch Canonicorum, Dorset
- Country: England
- Denomination: Anglican
- Website: cathedralofthevale.co.uk

History
- Status: Parish church
- Founder: Alfred the Great
- Dedication: St Wite, also known as St Candida

Architecture
- Functional status: Active
- Heritage designation: Grade I
- Designated: 5 September 1960
- Style: Early English, Perpendicular

Specifications
- Materials: Stone, slate roof

Administration
- Province: Canterbury
- Diocese: Salisbury
- Archdeaconry: Sherborne
- Deanery: Lyme Bay
- Parish: Whitchurch Canonicorum

Clergy
- Rector: Revd Christopher Martin

The Church of St Candida and Holy Cross is an Anglican church in Whitchurch Canonicorum, Dorset, England. A Saxon church stood on the site but nothing remains of that structure. The earliest parts of the church date from the 12th century when it was rebuilt by Benedictine monks. Further major rebuilding work took place in the 13th century and in the 14th century the church's prominent tower was constructed. The church features some Norman architectural features but is predominantly Early English and Perpendicular. George Somers, founder of the colony of Bermuda, is buried under the vestry and the assassinated Bulgarian dissident Georgi Markov is interred in the churchyard. It is an active Church of England parish church in the deanery of Lyme Bay, the archdeaconry of Sherborne, and the diocese of Salisbury. It is one of only two parish churches in the country to have a shrine that contains the relics of their patron saint. The relics belong to St. Candida (the Latin form of Saint Wite) to whom the church is dedicated. The church been designated by English Heritage as a Grade I listed building.

== History ==
The church lies on the northern edge of Whitchurch Canonicorum, a small village in the Marshwood Vale in west Dorset. Alfred the Great founded a church on the site in the 9th century named Hwitan Cyrican ("White Church" or "Whitchurch") and bequeathed it to his youngest son Æthelweard. (Note: Whitchurch was a common name for a church made of white stone. However, it is possible this church was named after St Wite, whose remains are interred in the north transept.) However, nothing significant remains of that structure. In the 11th century William the Conqueror gave ownership of the church to the monks of St Wandrille's monastery in Normandy, France. They began a major reconstruction and expansion of the building in the 12th century. In 1190 the monks sold or gave the church and benefice to the Bishop of Salisbury and in the early 13th century it was handed over to Robert de Mandeville, Lord of Marshwood Vale, in return for an annual fee. De Mandeville made further extensive renovations: the nave, north and south transept and south wall of the chancel were added, and a shrine containing the remains of St Wite was erected. In the mid-13th century de Mandeville presented ownership of the church to the Bishop of Bath and Wells. However, the Bishop of Salisbury was unwilling to relinquish his annual payment and a compromise was reached whereby the parish tithes would be divided between the two canons. It was at this time that the Latin affix Canonicorum (of the canons) was added to Whitchurch.

By the early 15th century, the parish had become one of the largest in England. The porch and parapet of the south aisle were built, and the tower—a prominent local landmark—was added. The shrine and its relic's reputed healing powers made the church a busy and prosperous centre of pilgrimage. However, this was abruptly halted by the 16th century Reformation which prohibited the veneration of saints. Few substantial alterations have taken place since: the rood loft has been removed, the south vestry was added in 1822 and during restoration work in the 1840s the roofs of the chancel and south transept were replaced, the north aisle was widened and the clerestory windows were installed. The modern parish of Whitchurch Canonicorum belongs to the Church of England Diocese of Salisbury. In addition to St Candida and Holy Cross, which is the parish church and administrative centre, it contains the 19th-century churches of Stanton St Gabriel's in Morcombelake and St John the Baptist in Fishpond Bottom. In 1960 the church was designated as a Grade I listed building—the highest of three grades defined by English Heritage as being of "exceptional interest, sometimes considered to be internationally important".

== St Wite's shrine ==
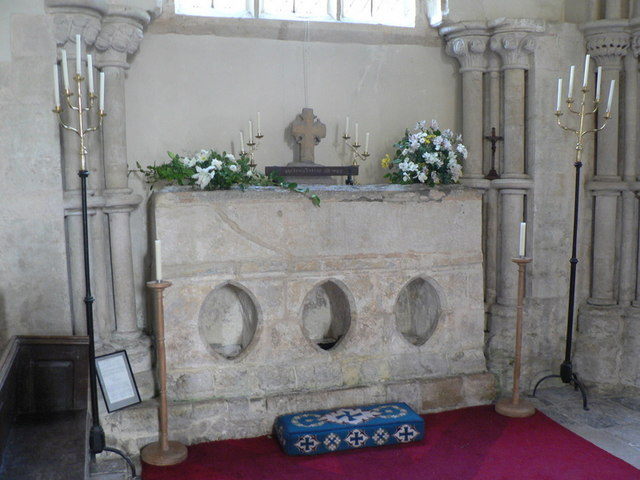
The shrine of St Wite

The church's shrine contains the relics of its patron saint, St Wite (St Candida is the Latin translation). It is one of only two shrines with relics in an English parish church and the only shrine and relics in the country to survive the Reformation besides Edward the Confessor's in Westminster Abbey and St Eanswythe in Folkestone. The shrine is a plain 13th century limestone altar tomb approximately 5 feet (1.5 m) tall. It comprises a rectangular coffin with a Purbeck Marble lid supported by a base that features three oval openings. Pilgrims believed the relics to have healing powers and these openings enabled them to place personal belongings or diseased body parts into the shrine in hope of a cure. The reason for its survival during the 16th century Reformation when shrines, relics and associated paraphernalia were systematically destroyed is unclear. It is possible, however, its purpose was concealed and its plain design caused to be mistaken for an unremarkable tomb of no significance. However, the concealment was so successful that the identity of the saint was lost. Local tradition suggests that she was an Anglo-Saxon holy woman or hermit who was slain by marauding Vikings. Another theory identifies her as Gwen Teirbron (also known as St Blanche, St Wite or St Candida), a 6th-century Breton holy woman. In 1900 the tomb was opened and was found to hold a lead casket containing the bones of a small woman. On the casket was the Latin inscription "HIC-REQESCT-RELIQE-SCE-WITE" ("Here lie the remains of St Wite").

== Architecture ==
The church is a typical cruciform shape and is a mixture of architectural styles. It is the most complete example of Early English architecture in Dorset: the heart of the church—the nave and transepts—were built in this style. It also incorporates some Norman features and significant Perpendicular additions. It was constructed in Lias ashlar stone with slate roofs and has a nave with clerestory, north and south aisles, north and south transepts, a west tower, chancel, south porch and south vestry. The tower is Perpendicular and has five stages. It is approximately 75 feet (23 m) tall and has a crenellated parapet and set back buttresses topped by crocketed pinnacles. The tower's west doorway has spandrels containing plant-motifs below a quatrefoil. Above the doorway sits a transomed window flanked by empty canopied statue niches. (Note: The fate of the statues that once stood in the niches is unknown.) The tower contains eight bells: the oldest is from the 17th century and the newest is a replacement cast in 2012 by John Taylor & Co. High up on the tower walls are a number of carved stone panels. On the south side is a panel featuring an archaic (possibly Viking) ship and an axe, and on both sides there are carvings of an adze. The single-story south porch is Perpendicular and features a crenellated parapet, diagonal buttresses and large carved grotesques at each corner.

The south doorway is Norman. The jambs have circular nook-shafts topped by leafy capitals. The arch has a dog-tooth pattern and a beak-head at the apex and terminals. On the wall of the south aisle is a stone carving of a two-handed cup—supposedly a representation of the Holy Grail. The three arches of the south arcade are also Norman. They have round piers topped with waterleaf and scallop capitals. The label mould of the central arch is topped by a beak-head and has a naturalistic-head at the base of each spandrel. The four bays of the north arcade are Early English. The columns stand on plinths and each have four shafts topped by a variety of intricately carved capitals featuring naturalistic foliage and trumpet-scallops. The arches are pointed—one features a bold double-chevron motif. The clerestory windows are quatrefoils with rere-arches. The roof of the nave is barrel-vaulted wood with painted bosses and dates from the 14th century. The chancel arch is wide and pointed. The east wall of chancel—rebuilt in 1847–48 by former vicar William Palmer—has three stepped lancets. The two south windows are Early English lancets and the oak stalls of the chancel are decorated with early 16th century arabesque and traceried panels. The transepts have Early English lancets but the north and south windows are three-light Perpendicular additions. The north transept has wall arcades with clustered respond shafts and leaf capitals. The south transept is plainer and houses the church's windpipe organ. The font is a Norman stone bowl decorated with overlapping arches. The octagonal wooden pulpit is Jacobean and is decorated with two tiers of arches.

== Notable memorials and graves ==
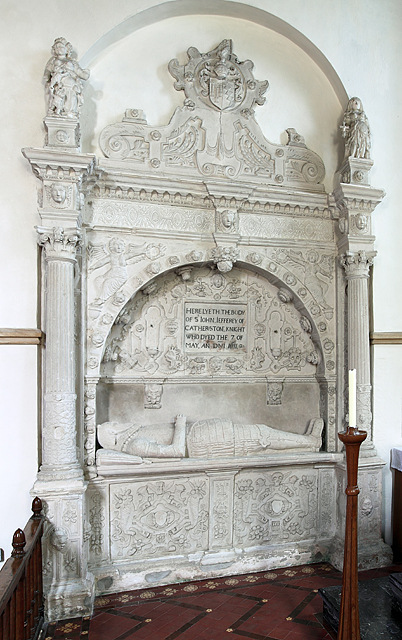
The effigial monument to Sir John Jefferey

In the chancel is a highly decorated monument with a recumbent effigy of Sir John Jefferey, who died in 1611. The memorial features fluted columns and ornately carved strapwork with cornucopias, fleurons, masks and other motifs. Nearby is the tomb of John Wadham of Catherston, from a collateral branch of the family later to found Wadham College, Oxford. He was "Captain of the Queen's Majestie at Sandesfoot Castle", MP for Weymouth and Recorder of Lyme, and died in 1584. It is a plain tablet of two panels with a tall pediment decorated with a cluster of circles.

A 1905 brass plaque on the south wall commemorates Admiral Sir George Somers, founder of the English colony of Bermuda, who died in 1610. His body, minus his heart, is buried under the vestry. (Note: Somers died "of a surfeit of eating pig" on Bermuda. His heart was buried on the island but the rest of his body was returned to England.) Another plaque commemorates Victoria Cross recipient Edgar Christopher Cookson who was killed at the Battle of Es Sinn in 1915. Bulgarian dissident Georgi Markov, who was assassinated in London in 1978, is buried in the churchyard. The ashes of broadcaster Robin Day are interred near the south door of the church.

== See also ==
- Media related to Church of St Candida and Holy Cross at Wikimedia Commons
- Grade I listed buildings in Dorset
