= Saint Wite =

English saint (died c. 831)

- Died: c. 831; Charmouth, Dorset
- Cause of death: killed by Danish Vikings
- Honored in: Orthodox Church
- Major shrine: Church of St Candida and Holy Cross
- Feast: 1 June
- Patronage: Dorset

Saint Wite (pronounced Wee-ta; died c. 831) was a 9th-century Saxon holy woman from Dorset who was killed by marauding Danes. She is venerated in the Orthodox Church, is the patron saint of Dorset and has her feast day on 1 June, also celebrated as Dorset Day. She is also known as Saint Candida (Candida is the Latin word for white).

== Historiography ==
Saint Wite is variously spelt as Wite, Whyte or Witta. Her name is pronounced Wee-ta.

The chroniclers William of Worcester and John Gerard recorded the history of Saint Wite in the 15th and 16th centuries. Thomas More recorded the custom of offering cakes or cheese to the saint on her feast day.

Local oral tradition recounts that Saint Wite lived as a hermit on secluded cliffs in prayer and solitude. She maintained fires as beacons to guide sailors. She was killed by Danish Vikings during a 9th-century raid on Charmouth, which corroborates with a landing at Charmouth of around 15,000 Vikings and the battle of Chardown Hill in 831AD.

Wite is an Old English word with no Latin connections.

Other theories have suggested that Saint Wite was actually the 4th century martyr Saint Candida who was killed in Carthage or the 6th-century Breton Saint Gwen Teirbron. Sabine Baring-Gould suggested that she was the fifth-century Breton Saint Blanche.

== Shrine ==
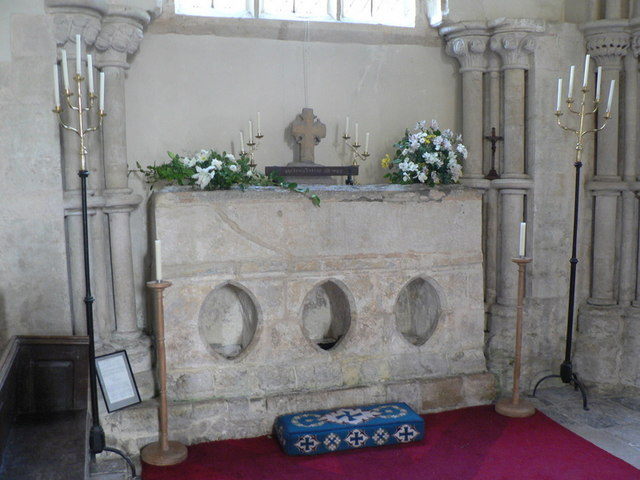
Saint Wite's shrine at the Church of St Candida and Holy Cross in Whitchurch Canonicorum

The shrine containing Saint Wite's relics is located in the north transept of the parish Church of St Candida and Holy Cross in Whitchurch Canonicorum, in the Marshwood Vale between Bridport and Lyme Regis, Dorset.

Saint Wite is said to have the power to cure ailments. In the medieval period, her shrine became one of England's most visited pilgrimage sites. The 13th century base of the limestone and marble shrine has three vertically orientated and vesica shaped openings, into which were placed diseased limbs or articles belonging to the sick. Pilgrims would then pray for Saint Wite's intercession. There were separate openings in the outside wall for people afflicted with leprosy.

Saint Wite's shrine escaped desecration during the 16th century Reformation in England, which prohibited the veneration of saints.

In 1900, a crack developed in her tomb. It was opened and was found to hold a lead casket containing the bones of a small woman about 40 years old. On the casket was the Latin inscription "HIC-REQESCT-RELIQE-SCE-WITE" ("Here lie the remains of St Wite"). It was then restored.

There is a holy well associated with Saint Wite at Morcombelake nearby. It was first documented in 1630 and is managed by the National Trust.

== Patron saint of Dorset ==
Saint Wite's Cross on the flag of Dorset

Saint Wite is the patron saint of the county of Dorset and her feast day is 1 June, which is also celebrated as Dorset Day.

In 2008, Dorset County Council organised a design competition and vote to adopt a Flag of Dorset. 54% of the 3,868 votes cast were for the design featuring Saint Wite's Cross, with the colours of gold representing the Wessex dragon and red representing a Dorset military regiment. The flag has been registered at the Flag Institute and added to their UK Flags Register.
