= Cleaver Heath Nature Reserve =

Nature reserve and Site of Special Scientific Interest in Wirral, England

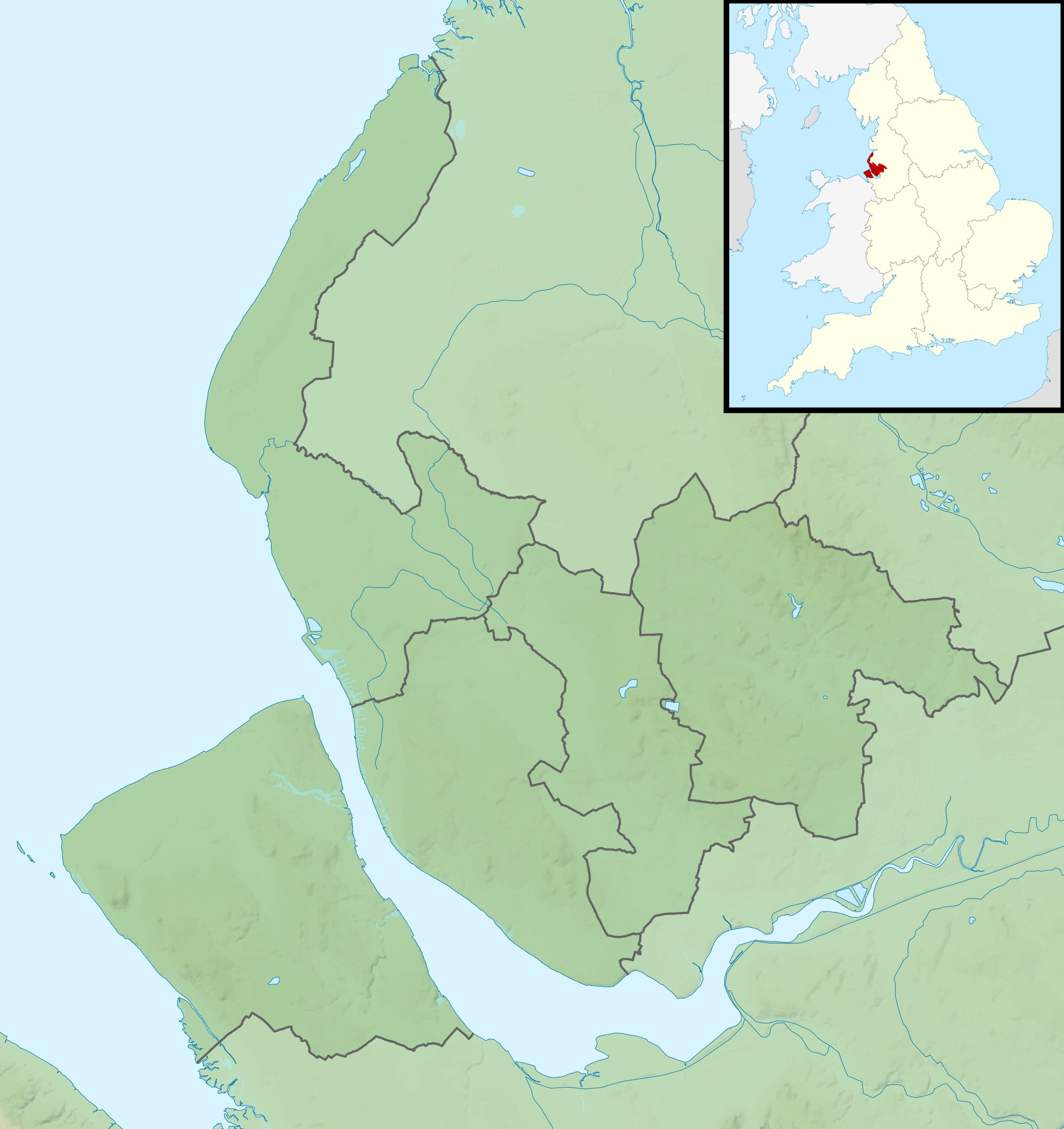
- Location within Merseyside
- Interactive map of Cleaver Heath Nature Reserve
- Type: Nature reserve and SSSI
- Location: Wirral
- OS grid: SJ256826
- Coordinates: 53.3318°N 3.1175°W
- Area: 3 hectares (7.4 acres)
- Elevation: 90 metres (300 ft)
- Operator: Cheshire Wildlife Trust
- Open: any reasonable time

Cleaver Heath Nature Reserve is a nature reserve in Heswall, on the Wirral Peninsula, managed by the Cheshire Wildlife Trust. It forms part of the Heswall Dales Site of Special Scientific Interest (SSSI).

Heswall Dales is regarded as the second best example (after Thurstaston Common) of lowland heath in Merseyside, hosting localised species including Western Gorse Ulex gallii, Many-stalked Spike Rush Eleocharis multicaulis and Green-ribbed Sedge Carex binervis. Common lizards are also present. The reserve overlooks the estuary of the River Dee.
