= St Mary's Church, Catherston Leweston =

Church in Dorset, England

St Mary's Church
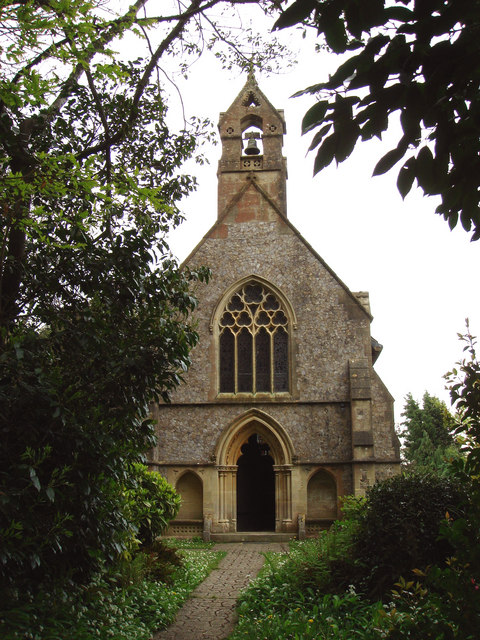

Religion
- Affiliation: Church of England
- Ecclesiastical or organizational status: Active
- Year consecrated: 1858

Location
- Location: Catherston Leweston, Dorset, England
- Interactive map of St Mary's Church
- Coordinates: 50.7456°N 2.8948°W

Architecture
- Architect: John Loughborough Pearson
- Type: Church
- Style: Early Decorated

St Mary's Church is a Church of England parish church in Catherston Leweston, Dorset, England. It was designed by John Loughborough Pearson and built in 1857–58. The church is a Grade II* listed building.

Today the church forms part of the Golden Cap Team of Churches, with Sunday services being held twice a month, along with occasional Songs of Praise services.

== History ==
St Mary's was built to replace an earlier church which was described as being of "ancient foundation", with the first recorded rector being Adam Payn in 1337. By the mid-19th century, the building had become dilapidated and the lord of the manor, Robert Charles Hildyard, decided to have a new church built at his sole expense. Plans were drawn up by John Loughborough Pearson of London for a church providing accommodation for 50 people.

The church was built by Mr. H. Poole of Westminster, with Mr. W. Buchanan of London as the foreman. Much of the carving work was carried out by Mr. M. Barns of Clifton and Mr. S. Poole of Westminster. The carpentry was carried out by Mr. W. Hoare of Charmouth and the flint masonry by Mr. J. Dunn of Charmouth. Hildyard laid the foundation stone during 1857, but died on 7 December 1857, before the church was completed. The church was consecrated by the Bishop of Salisbury, the Right Rev. Walter Kerr Hamilton, on 7 September 1858. Repairs were carried out to the church in 1977.

== Architecture ==
St Mary's is built of knapped flint, with Bath stone dressings and roofs covered with red tiles from Stoke-upon-Trent. The internal stonework is of Bath and Caen stone ashlar. The church is made up of a nave, chancel and north vestry with organ chamber. The entrance is through a recessed door at the west end. Above is a bell-cot, featuring gablets and a foliated cross, containing a single bell. It was cast from a piece of brass cannon captured at Sebastopol during the Crimean War (1853–1856).

The oak roof is of arch-braced construction and has stone corbels in the form of carved angels. All of the paving inside the church is made up of Mintons tiles. The church's fittings are contemporary with the 1857–58 rebuild; the seats are of oak, and the octagonal pulpit and font are both of Beer stone. The font was gifted by Frederick Hildyard in memory of R. C. Hildyard. The organ was made by Joseph Walker of London in 1857 and underwent repair by R. Godfrey in 1983.

The windows have stained glass from Clayton and Bell of London. Many of the windows are memorials to the Hildyard family. Some depict the Agony in the Garden, the Betrayal, the Bearing of the Cross, the Entombment and the Resurrection. The west window illustrates the life of St Mary. The chancel contains a reredos, sedilia and credence shelf. The reredos has a triple arcade, supported on green marble pillars, with stone capitals and bases. In the sacrarium, the Pede cloth and kneeling cushions were made by Mrs. Hildyard.

There are memorial tablets to R. C. Hildyard, dated 1857, and his son R. H. Hildyard, dated 1876. Both are buried in the churchyard. In the chancel is a memorial tablet to Catherine Hildyard, who died in 1855.
