= Æthelweard (son of Alfred) =

Younger son of King Alfred the Great and Ealhswith

Æthelweard (c. 880 – 920 or 922) was the younger son of King Alfred the Great and Ealhswith.

== Early life and education ==
He was born about 880. That he was Alfred's younger son by Ealhswith is stated by Asser in his biography of the king (c. 893). Asser also provides valuable detail on the boy's upbringing. Whereas his brother Edward and sister Ælfthryth were raised and educated at court, Æthelweard was sent to a type of school (schola), where he learned to read and write both Latin and Old English and was instructed in the liberal arts "under the attentive care of teachers, in company with all the nobly born children of virtually the entire area, and a good many of lesser birth as well." Such education would have started at an early age, before the onset of adolescence.

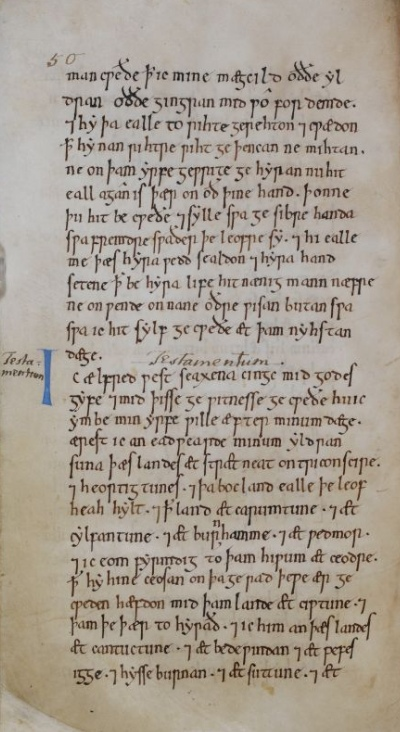
Will of Alfred the Great, AD 873–888, granting land to Æthelweard (11th-century copy, British Library Stowe MS 944, ff. 29v–33r)

== Estates and activity ==
Through Alfred's patronage, Æthelweard became a wealthy landowner. In his father's will (AD 873 x 888), in which he is unnamed but called Alfred's "younger son" (þam gingran minan suna ), he is the beneficiary of a vast number of estates across the south of Britain: Arreton (Isle of Wight), Dean (i.e. East Dean or West Dean, West Sussex), Meon (i.e. East Meon or West Meon, Hampshire), Amesbury (Wiltshire), Dean (probably West Dean, Wiltshire), Sturminster Marshall (Dorset), Yeovil (Somerset), Crewkerne (Somerset), Whitchurch Canonicorum (Dorset), Axmouth (Devon), Branscombe (Devon), Cullompton (Devon), Tiverton (Devon), Mylenburnan (probably Burn in Silverton, Devon), Exminster (Devon), Suðeswyrðe (possibly Lustleigh, Devon), Lifton (Devon) and appurtenant lands, i.e. all his father's property in Cornwall, except Triggshire.

Since the (late) 890s, Æthelweard attested several of his brother's charters.

== Death ==
According to John of Worcester, he died on 16 October 922 and his body received burial at Winchester, where he was soon joined by his brother Edward (d. 924). William of Malmesbury confirms the place of burial, but places his death four years before Edward's. It may have been Æthelweard whose name was entered into the New Minster Liber Vitae, fol. 9v., with the designation clito "ætheling", but if so, he seems to be mistaken for a son of Edward.

== Descendants ==
William tells that Æthelweard had two sons, Æthelwine and Ælfwine, who died fighting in the Battle of Brunanburh in 937, and who were buried in Malmesbury Abbey, at the behest of their cousin King Æthelstan, who was buried there himself only two years later. The connection with this house is prominent in a series of three spurious charters from the Malmesbury archive, in which Athelstan is made to endow the abbey in memory of his "cousins" (patruelia) Æthelweard, Ælfwine and Æthelwine. If Ælfwine and Æthelwine died childless, their deaths would have brought an end to Æthelweard's direct descent.

== Primary sources ==
- Anglo-Saxon charters:
  - S 1507 (AD 873 x 888), King Alfred's will, tr. S. Keynes and M. Lapidge, Alfred the Great. Harmondsworth, 1983. pp. 173–8, with notes, pp. 313–26.
  - S 434, S 435, S 436 (AD 937).
- Historians
  - Asser, Vita Ælfredi, ed. W.H. Stevenson, Asser's Life of King Alfred. Oxford, 1904; tr. S.D. Keynes and M. Lapidge, Alfred the Great. Harmondsworth, 1983. pp. 65–110.
  - William of Malmesbury, Gesta regum Anglorum, ed. and tr. R.A.B. Mynors, R. M. Thomson and M. Winterbottom, William of Malmesbury. Gesta Regum Anglorum. The History of the English Kings. OMT. 2 vols: vol 1. Oxford, 1998.
  - John of Worcester, Chronicle (of Chronicles), ed. Benjamin Thorpe, Florentii Wigorniensis monachi chronicon ex chronicis. 2 vols. London, 1848–9; tr. J. Stevenson, Church Historians of England. 8 vols: vol. 2.1. London, 1855. 171–372.
- New Minster Liber Vitae, fol. 9v., per entry in PASE.
