= Dingesmere =

Historical place

Dingesmere is a place known only from the Old English poem of the Battle of Brunanburh. The name is found in versions of the Anglo-Saxon Chronicle from the year 937.

Lines 53-56 of the poem in the Anglo-Saxon Chronicle (version A) read:

Gewitan him þa Norðmen nægledcnearrum,
dreorig daraða laf, on Dingesmere
ofer deop wæter Difelin secan,
eft Iraland, æwiscmode.

(The B, C, D and W versions of the Anglo-Saxon Chronicle contain the variant spellings Dyngesmere, Dingesmere, Dynigesmere and Dinnesmere.)

These lines have been translated as:

Then the sorry remnant of the Norsemen, who had escaped the spears, set out upon the sea of Dinge in their nail-studded ships, making for Dublin over deep waters. Humiliated in spirit they returned to Ireland.

As Dingesmere does not correspond to any known place-name its meaning has caused considerable controversy. Apart from “sea of Dinge”, suggestions have included: “dingy sea”; “sea of noise”; and “wetland of the Thing (assembly)”.

One of the locations that has been cited is situated on the Dee Estuary at Heswall, Wirral. Another possible location is Lingham, on the Irish Sea coastline of Wirral at Moreton. In an article in Notes and Queries in 2022, Michael Deakin argues that such a wetland on the tenth-century Wirral coast of the Dee was unlikely.

It has also been proposed that Dingesmere corresponds to Foulness Valley in the East Riding of Yorkshire, which in Anglo-Saxon times would have been a wetland, or mere, from the region of Holme-on-Spalding-Moor to the Humber estuary. The name ‘Foulness’ comes from the Old English fūle[n] ēa, meaning “dirty water”, because iron deposits in the water produced a brown discolouration; i.e. a ‘dung-coloured wetland’, or, in Old English, ‘dinges-mere’ (Old English ding, dung + mere, wetland).

== See also ==
- Battle of Ringmere
