= St John's Church, Fishpond Bottom =

Church in Dorset, England

St John's Church
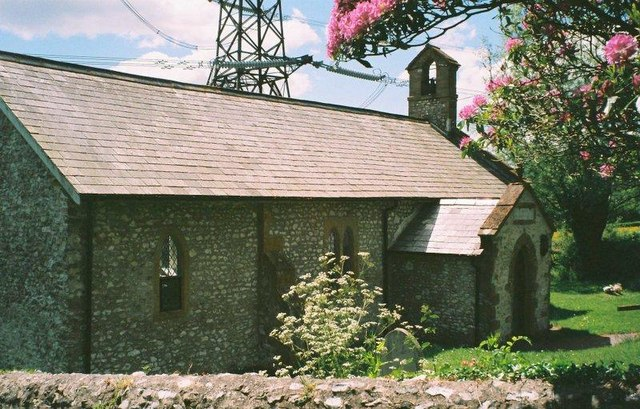

Religion
- Affiliation: Church of England
- Ecclesiastical or organizational status: Active

Location
- Location: Fishpond Bottom, Dorset, England
- Interactive map of St John's Church
- Coordinates: 50.7809°N 2.8996°W

Architecture
- Type: Church
- Completed: 1852

St John's Church is a Church of England church in Fishpond Bottom, Dorset, England. It was built in 1852 and has been a Grade II listed building since 1984. Today the church forms part of the Golden Cap Team of Churches, with a morning service held there three Sundays a month.

== History ==
St John's was built in 1852 as a chapel of ease to the parish church of St Candida and Holy Cross at Whitchurch Canonicorum. With a three to four mile journey to the parish church from Fishpond Bottom, Rev. William Palmer, the vicar of Whitchurch Canonicorum, began conducting a Sunday evening service in a licensed room at Fishpond Bottom around the beginning of 1852. The attendance of the weekly service surpassed the vicar's expectations and a purpose-built church was then erected through his efforts. Construction of the church began in May 1852 and was completed by September. At the time of completion, the church was licensed but not consecrated.

== Design ==
The church, designed to accommodate 200 persons, is made up of a four-bay nave and north porch, with a turret containing one bell on the roof's west gable. The church is built of local stone sourced from near Stoke Abbott, with Hamstone used for the window mullions and heads, and slate on the roof. The intermediate space between the stone walls is filled with flint. Interior fittings include a small octagonal stone font and stained glass of 1967 by Arthur Edward Buss. The altar room contains slate flooring laid by John Stark and Partners in 1963.
