= The Puddydale =

Park in England

Coordinates: 53.3298°N 3.1005°W

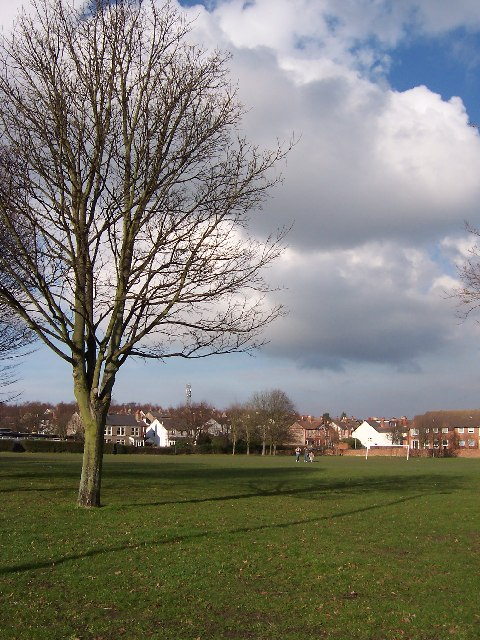
The Puddydale

The Puddydale is a park and grassy area in Heswall, Wirral, England. It is on Telegraph Road, close to the main shopping area of Heswall. The land was given to the parish in 1859 by the Commissioners of Enclosure. It was previously the site of a lake, drained in 1922, and later became a rubbish tip; since 1932 it has been a playing field. It includes a children's playground. Local football teams use the site.

The eastern side of The Puddydale was originally the site of Heswall Primary School from 1909 to 1982, but is now the site of residential flats.
