= Flag of Dorset =

Flag of English county

Dorset
- Other names: Saint Wite's Cross, The Dorset Cross
- Proportion: 3:5
- Adopted: 2008
- Designed by: Stephen Coombs; David White

The flag of Dorset (also known as the Dorset Cross, and Saint Wite's Cross) is the flag of the English county of Dorset. It was chosen as the flag of Dorset on 16 September 2008 following a vote open to all Dorset residents, and organised by Dorset County Council. The unitary authorities of Bournemouth (historically part of Hampshire) and Poole declined an invitation to participate. The flag has subsequently been registered at the Flag Institute and added to their UK Flags Register.

== History ==
In 2005 Dorset expatriate Stephen Coombs conceived a Dorset flag using white and red from the arms of Dorset County Council, using a simple cross design on a golden background. Dorchester resident David White joined the discussion in 2006 and created the very first version of the flag, but no serious attempt to raise the profile of the flag occurred at that time.

In 2007, an armorial banner of the Dorset County Council coat of arms appeared for commercial sale, which prompted David White to raise the question of a flag for Dorset in the press. The council's initial response was to reject these calls saying it had no authority to create a flag as its administrative area was not the same as the county itself.

In early 2008, following discussions with Flag Institute member Jason Saber, an independent campaign led by David White began to promote the flag that Stephen Coombs and he had previously designed. Another campaign led by town criers Chris Brown, Jacqui Hall and Melvyn Gudger was promoting a different design at the same time, but decided to merge with White's campaign and continue promoting the Coombs/White flag.

In order to produce flags for the campaign and spread awareness, local businesses were offered the opportunity to sponsor production of the first 100 flags.

In April 2008 John Peake, the chairman of Dorset County Council, reversed the previous decision on a potential flag and asked the Dorset public to submit other ideas for a Dorset flag through the local press. Designs were submitted until the end of June 2008.

During this time, Chris Brown persuaded the town of Wimborne Minster to adopt the Coombs/White flag regardless of the competition outcome.

Although the Bournemouth and Poole unitary authorities declined to participate in the event, council-sponsored voting took place from 12 August to 12 September and all residents of Dorset were eligible to vote. The Dorset Cross was announced as the winner on 16 September 2008 after receiving 54% (2086 votes) of the vote.

Subsequent funding made from the campaign was given to local charities.

In November 2010, the flag was flown above HQ of the Department for Communities and Local Government in London. In an initiative by Eric Pickles MP, each of the nation's county flags were flown for a week to show their importance to the nation's heritage.

The flag featured quite prominently in the 2013 Dorset set TV series Broadchurch, which was in part filmed in West Bay.

Dorset-based brewery Sunny Republic created an ale named 'Dorset Cross' after the flag.

== The flag ==
The Dorset flag is made of three colours - red (pantone 186), white and gold (pantone 116). These colours are found in the arms (and supporters) of Dorset County Council.

Although the gold in the flag was applied by Stephen Coombs in order to follow the rule of tincture, it was later suggested that to be more significant than originally thought:

- The supporters of the arms of Dorset County Council are two golden dragons, representing Wessex, the ancient Anglo-Saxon kingdom. Dorset was at the heart of Wessex, which is said to have used a golden dragon as its emblem.
- During the Duke of Monmouth' uprising in 1685, the Dorset militia wore red coats with yellow facings. The drummers had this reversed with yellow coats and red facings.
- The three colours are also found in the coat of arms of the Sherborne Abbey
- Dorset's agriculture. During spring, much of rural Dorset grows rapeseed, covering the county in fields of yellow. Dorset also grows wheat and barley.
- Dorset's sandy beaches; particularly Weymouth and Bournemouth.
- Golden Cap, the highest point on the Jurassic Coast.
- Gold Hill, the nationally famous street in Shaftesbury.
- The Dorset militia and regiment used the colours gold, red and green.
- Gold, red and white are also used in the flags of the Channel Islands Jersey, Guernsey and Sark, traditionally reached from England through Dorset ports.

The flag has also been linked to the name of Saint Wite, a female Dorset saint who is buried at Whitchurch Canonicorum. An Anglo-Saxon holy woman, she is thought to have been martyred by invading Viking "Danes" in the 9th century. It has been variously known as "The Dorset Cross", "St Wite's Cross" or simply "The Dorset Flag". David White himself expressed a preference for "The Dorset Cross" for purposes of free interpretation, yet also abided by St. Wite's attachment to the flag as a symbol of "all that is unchanging... [and] down-to-earth" in Dorset's people and identity.

The official website of the flag is maintained by David White. Chris Brown proceeded to found the now defunct Dorset Flags For Good Causes group that sold flags to raise funds for Dorset-based good causes. This was eventually passed to the Dorset Community Foundation charity.

== Armorial banner ==
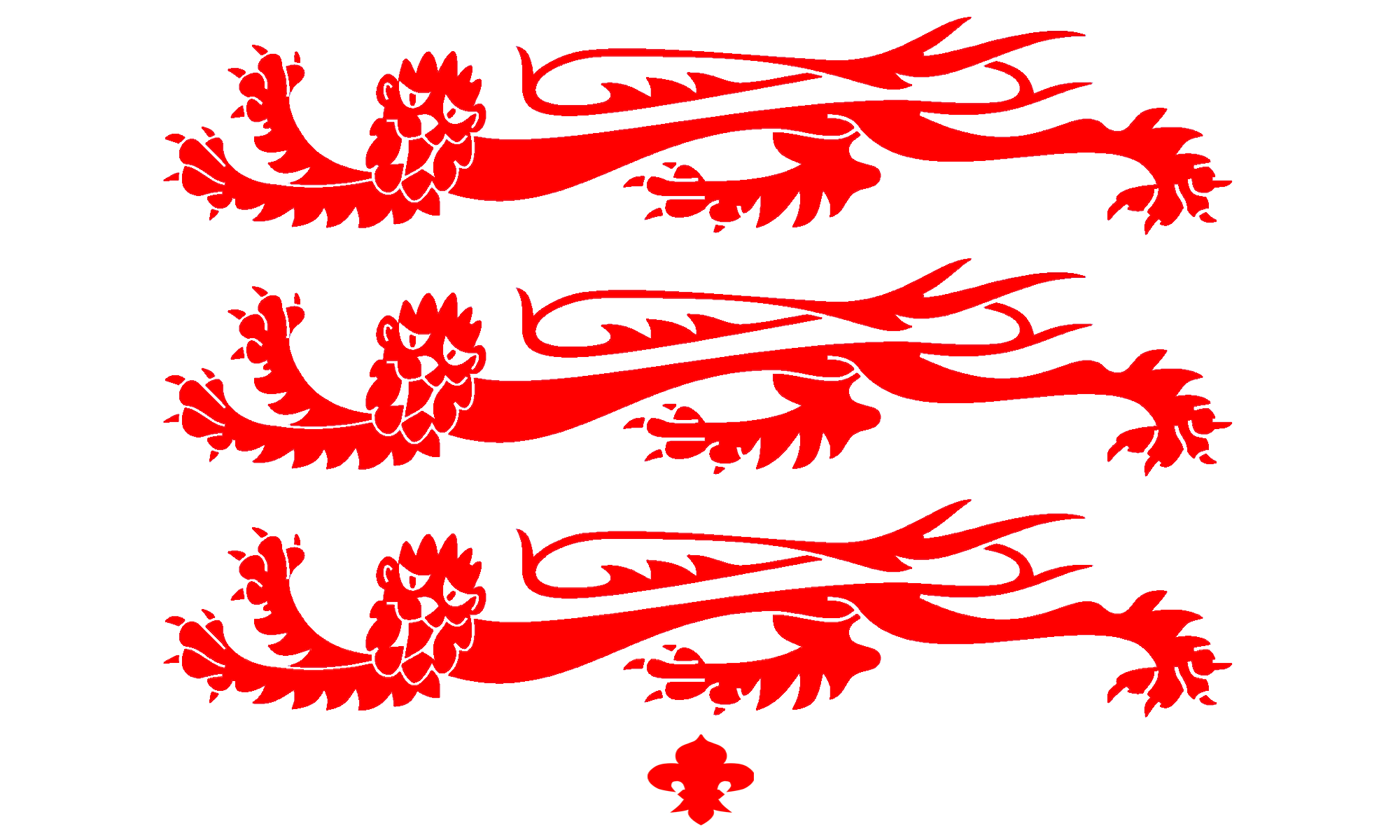
Dorset County Council armorial banner

The armorial banner of the Dorset County Council coat of arms includes three red lions passant guardant with a red fleur de lys on a white background. Strictly speaking, the arms only represent Dorset County Council, rather than Dorset as a whole and officially, permission should be sought to use them.

== Contenders ==
The original four final designs were selected by an independent judging panel and shortlisted for public voting. Voting began in August and ended on the 12 September 2008, although this was not held in the form of an officially constituted County referendum. 4090 votes were received, but 222 were discarded for various reasons. The other three contenders are shown below along with the explanations submitted by their designers:

Design A

Blue is for the sky and sea; yellow for sun and sand; and green for the fields and countryside. 108 votes.

Design C

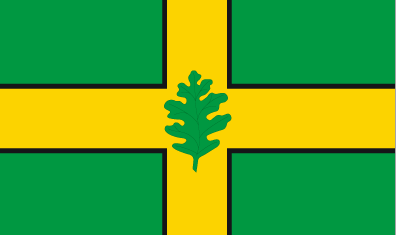

The green background is synonymous with the county of Dorset and maintains our identity as a green and pleasant land. The yellow cross depicts the beautiful beaches we are fortunate to be blessed with. The oak leaf signifies the rural nature of this wonderful county, something most people living here are very proud of. The black border around the yellow cross signifies the black death that came to our shores and nearly wiped out the population but through our resilience as a people we overcame that threat and made us the proud people we are today. 856 votes.

Design D

The colours on the flag should show all the good things we have in Dorset. Blue for the sea and beaches; green for the countryside; and gold for the sand and because Dorset is a sunny place to live. 818 votes.
