= Whitchurch Canonicorum =

Village in Dorset, England

Coordinates: 50.7545°N 2.8572°W

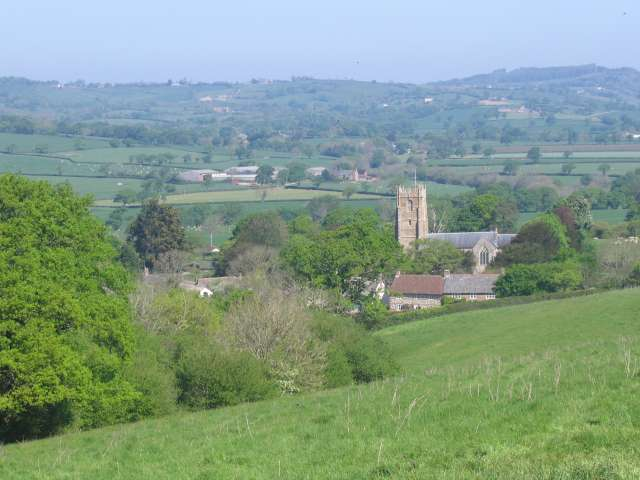
- Church of St Candida and Holy Cross viewed from the south

- Location within Dorset
- Population: 684 (2011)
- OS grid reference: SY395954
- Unitary authority: Dorset
- Ceremonial county: Dorset
- Region: South West
- Country: England
- Sovereign state: United Kingdom
- Post town: BRIDPORT
- Postcode district: DT6
- Dialling code: 01297
- Police: Dorset
- Fire: Dorset and Wiltshire
- Ambulance: South Western
- UK Parliament: West Dorset

Whitchurch Canonicorum (/ˈwɪtʃɜːrtʃ kəˌnɒnɪˈkɔːrəm/) is a village and civil parish in southwest Dorset, England, situated in the Marshwood Vale 5 miles (8.0 km) west-northwest of Bridport. In the 2011 Census the parish – which includes the settlements of Morcombelake, Ryall and Fishpond Bottom – had a population of 684.

In the 899 will of King Alfred the Great it was left to his youngest son Æthelweard, and in 1086 in the Domesday Book, the village was recorded as Witcerce.

On the northern edge of the village is the Church of St Candida and Holy Cross. It is noteworthy as containing the only shrine in Britain to have survived the Reformation with its relics intact, apart from those of Saint Edward the Confessor in Westminster Abbey and St Eanswythe in Folkestone. The saint in question is the somewhat obscure Saint Wite (Latinised as Saint Candida) after whom the church and the village are named. She is thought to be either a Christian martyred by the Danes or alternatively a West Saxon anchoress. Nothing more is known of her. The shrine of St Wite in the north wall of the transept is foramina-style, with three large vesica-shaped apertures for pilgrims to insert heads, hands, arms or feet. When the shrine was opened in 1900 it was found to contain a lead casket with the inscription +HIC. REQUIESCT. RELIQU. SCE. WITE (Here rest the relics of Saint Wite). The flag of Dorset makes dedication to St Wite.

Sir George Somers (1554–1610) was the Mayor of Lyme Regis and later Governor of The Somers Isles (Bermuda). He died "of a surfeit in eating of a pig", on 9 November 1610 in Bermuda. His heart was buried in Bermuda but his body, pickled in a barrel, was landed on the Cobb at Lyme Regis in 1618. A volley of muskets and cannon saluted his last journey to the church at Whitchurch Canonicorum where his body is buried. It is also the burial place of Bulgarian dissident Georgi Markov and Sir Robin Day.

The hamlet of Fishpond Bottom contains St John's Church, which was built in 1852 as a chapel of ease to the parish church at Whitchurch Canonicorum.

== Politics ==
In the UK national parliament, Whitchurch Canonicorum is within the West Dorset parliamentary constituency. As of 2024, the Member of Parliament (MP) is Edward Morello of the Liberal Democrats.

After 2019 structural changes to local government in England, Whitchurch Canonicorum is part of the Marshwood Vale ward which elects a single member to Dorset Council.

== See also ==
- Whitchurch Canonicorum (hundred)
- Flag of Dorset, The Dorset Cross/St Wite's Cross
- Marshwood and Powerstock Vales
