= Charmouth =

Village and civil parish in Dorset, England

Coordinates: 50.7368°N 2.9026°W

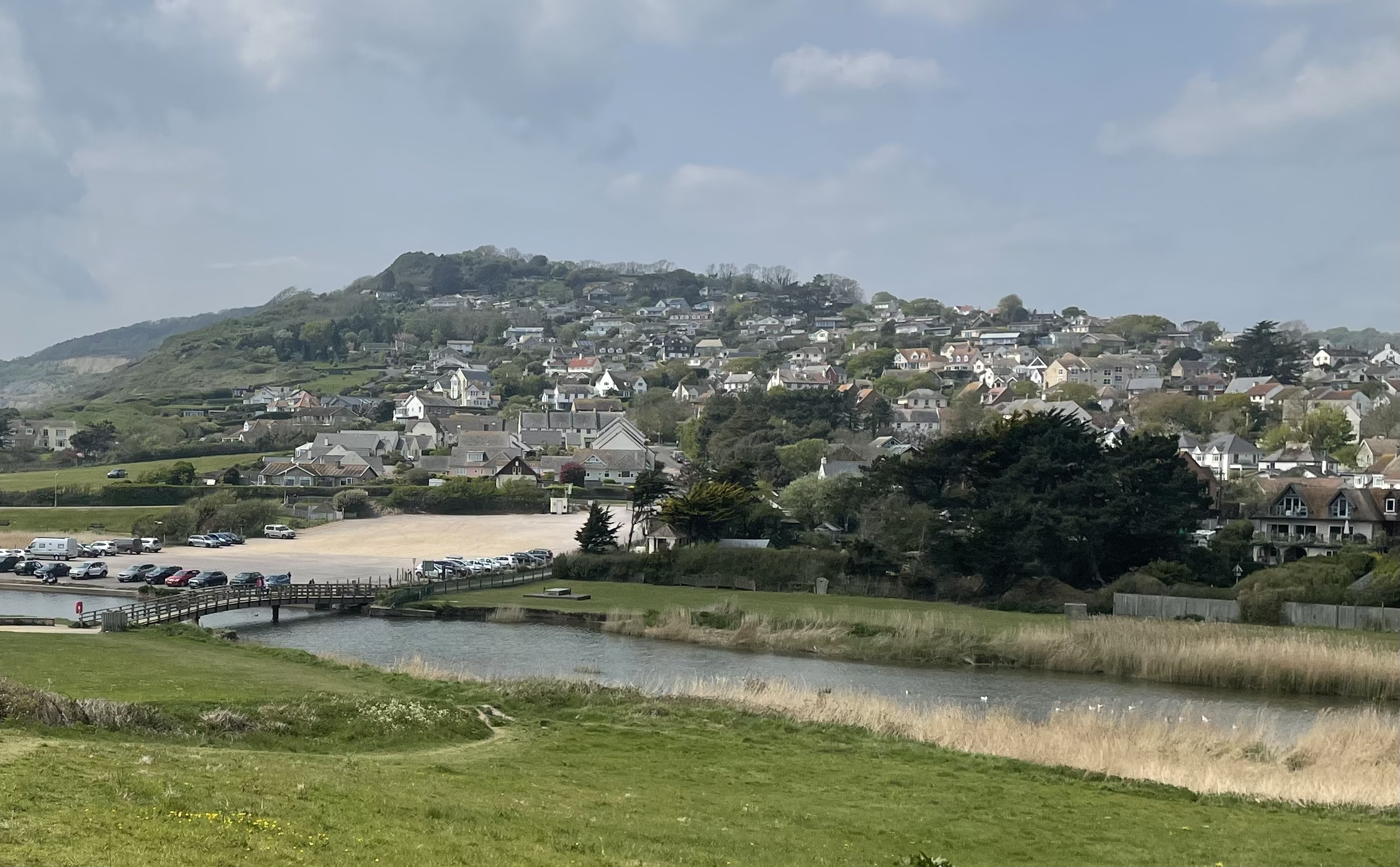
- View of Charmouth.

- Location within Dorset
- Population: 1,310 (2013 est.)
- OS grid reference: SY364934
- Civil parish: Charmouth
- Unitary authority: Dorset
- Ceremonial county: Dorset
- Region: South West
- Country: England
- Sovereign state: United Kingdom
- Post town: BRIDPORT
- Postcode district: DT6
- Dialling code: 01297
- Police: Dorset
- Fire: Dorset and Wiltshire
- Ambulance: South Western
- UK Parliament: West Dorset
- Website: Charmouth Portal

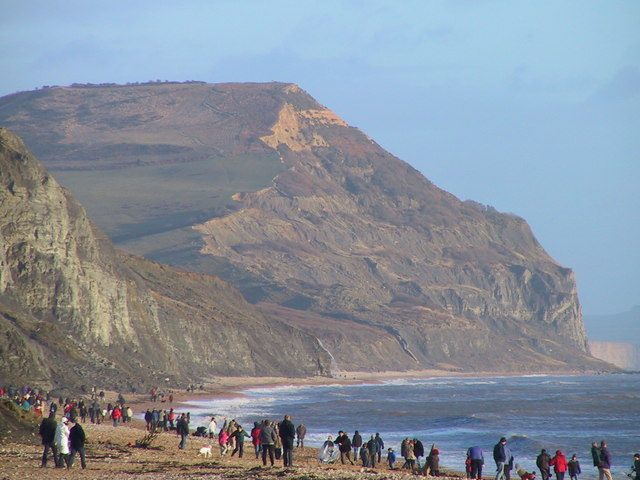
Golden Cap viewed from Charmouth beach

Charmouth is a village and civil parish in west Dorset, England. The village is situated on the mouth of the River Char, around 1.5 miles (2 km) north-east of Lyme Regis. Dorset County Council estimated that in 2013 the population of the civil parish was 1,310. In the 2011 census the population of the parish, combined with the small parish of Catherston Leweston to the north, was 1,352.

== History ==
Human occupation at Charmouth dates back to an Iron Age settlement by a Celtic tribe, the Durotriges. Evidence of hill forts can still be seen in the area.

In Saxon times Charmouth was 'Cernmunde', derived from 'Cerne' lit. 'stony river'. Historian George Roberts wrote:

During the Saxon period, the neighbouring coast was particularly subject to the invasions of the Danes, concerning whom so much has been written. In 787, the Danes, Northern men, or Normans^{[a]}, landed at Portland from three ships, to reconnoitre the country, which they did without interruption, as the Saxons had neglected their marine. A. D. 833, according to the Saxon Chronicle, though some of our historians place the event in 831 or 832, a dreadful battle was fought at Charmouth. The Danes having met with repulses in other parts of the kingdom sailed to Charmouth where having landed, Speed says, "they made cruel ravage and slaughter." Their fleet consisted of 35 ships, containing a powerful army: their whole force, Huntingdon remarks, must have amounted to 17,500 men; other writers have estimated their numbers at about 15,000. Egbert collected the whole force of the county, and marched to attack them, after they had continued their ravages, according to Matthew of Westminster, about a twelve month. The king had nearly succeeded in cutting them off as they were forming; he threw them into great confusion, but continual supplies of men from the ships turned the scale in their favour. The Saxons were routed: the night alone prevented their destruction by the infuriated invaders, by the favour of which, Speed says, the king hardly escaped. Among the number of the slain were two earls, his principal officers, Dudda and Osmond, Wigen, bishop of Sherborne, and Hereferth, bishop of Winton. The Danes, finding a settlement would be liable to the attacks of the brave Egbert, retired to their ships with precipitation, and set sail. They continued to hover about the coast. In 840, they effected a landing on the same spot, (set Carrum,) from the same number of ships. Ethelwulf's army, which he headed in person, advanced to encounter them: a bloody battle ensued, which, after a desperate struggle, terminated in the Danes remaining masters of the field, though they shortly afterwards retired without any spoil. A successive series of invasions followed.

The 1086 Domesday Book records Charmouth as 'Cernemude'; it had 22 households, 3 ploughlands and 16 acres (6.5 ha) of meadow. It was in Whitchurch Canonicorum Hundred and the tenant-in-chief was Count Robert of Mortain.

The buildings on either side of Charmouth's main street vary in age; some of the smaller cottages date from the 17th or 18th century, while others are built in later Regency style. A number of buildings in the village have listed building status.

In the 18th and 19th centuries Charmouth village was a noted resort, with visitors including novelist Jane Austen who wrote that it was "a nice place for sitting in unwearied contemplation".

=== Church ===
The present parish church, dedicated to Saint Andrew, was built in 1836, replacing an earlier building of circa 1503, which itself had replaced a mediaeval structure. Treves described it as "exceptionally ugly".

=== Abbots House ===
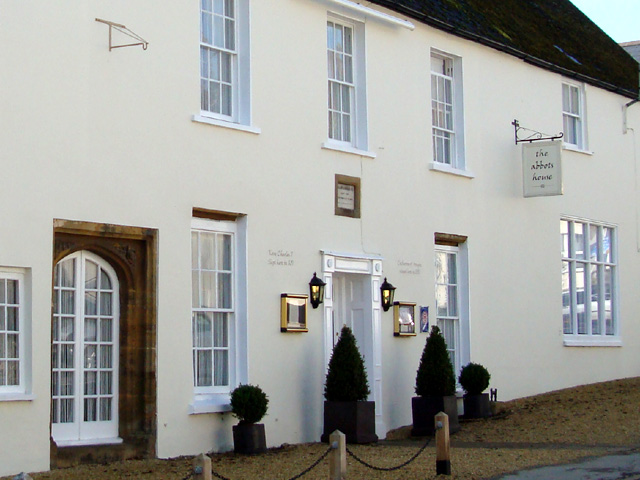
The Abbots House, formerly The Queens Armes Hotel

Abbots House (previously The Queens Armes Hotel) is a grade II listed, early 16th-century house that was re-faced in the 18th century. It once belonged to Forde Abbey and the badge of Catherine of Aragon was found worked into the plaster of an upstairs room.

The inn gave shelter to the fugitive King Charles II on 22 September 1651, when he came disguised looking for a boat to take him to France following his defeat at the Battle of Worcester. A small trading ship was found bound for St Malo. The master, Stephen Limbry, agreed to pick up the King from Charmouth beach and transport him to the ship, but just two hours before the pick up Limbry told his wife, who locked him in his room and stole his clothes to ensure he would not become involved. On the following day Charles left Charmouth pursued by troops, who were alerted to his presence by an employee of the inn.

== Governance ==
Charmouth was in its own electoral ward, which included Wootton Fitzpaine and the surrounding area. It had a population of 1,697 in the 2011 census. After 2019 structural changes to local government, Charmouth is part of the Lyme and Charmouth ward, which elects one member to Dorset Council.

Charmouth is part of the West Dorset constituency for elections to the House of Commons of the United Kingdom.

== Geography ==
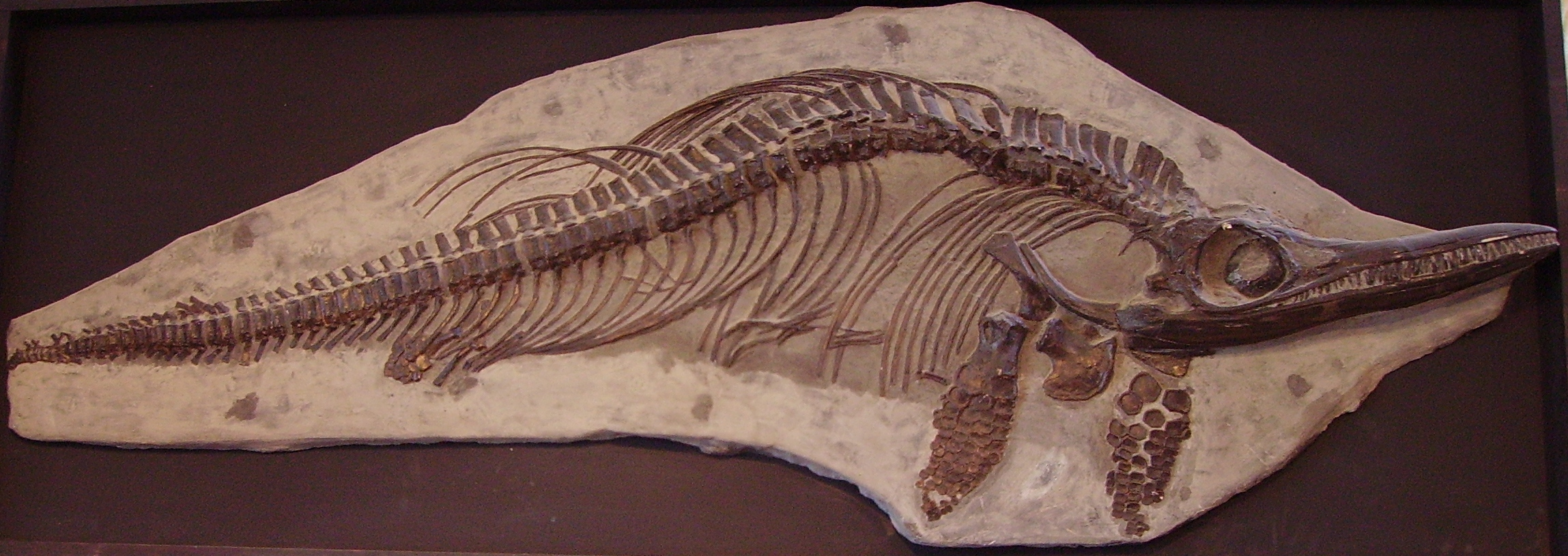
Ichthyosaur fossil from Charmouth

Charmouth is a coastal village which overlooks Lyme Bay and is part of the Jurassic Coast. It lies among steep hills and is sited on a sloping site to the west of the River Char, close to its mouth at the English Channel. Stonebarrow Hill is to the east, Black Venn to the west, and Golden Cap, the highest cliff on the south coast of England at 191 metres (627 ft), is 2.5 miles (4 km) to the east. The National Trust owns significant portions of the surrounding area.

The cliffs above the beach are a noted source of fossils from the Jurassic period.

== Amenities ==
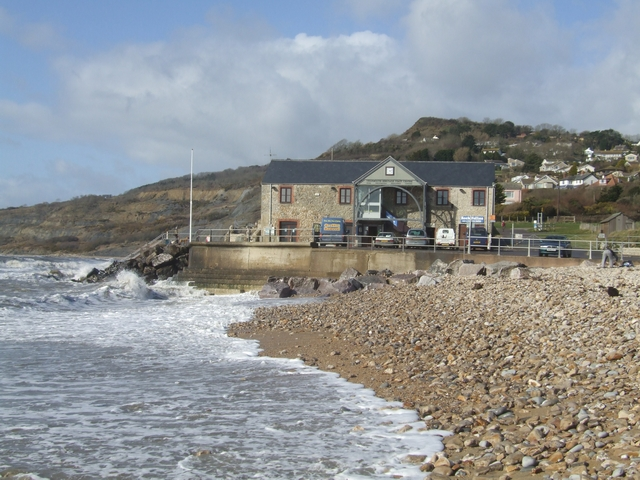
Charmouth Heritage Coast Centre

There are shops and cafes by the beach and on the main street to serve locals and tourists, including a fossil shop, cafés, bakers, two pubs, and ironmonger. The Charmouth Heritage Coast Centre is based in a long-disused cement factory on the foreshore. Charmouth Primary School is located to the south of the village within view of the beach. The Barrs Lane Recreation Ground has children's play equipment and grass pitches, and is the site of an annual summer 'party in the park' offering family entertainment.

== Notable person ==
- Llewellyn Rees, actor (1901–1994)

== See also ==
- List of Dorset beaches
- South West Coast Path

== Notes ==
a.	Normans during this period refers to the original Germanic nation so should not be confused with the Normans to have arrived from Normandy (i.e. France) generally associated with the Norman Conquest of England. The latter refers to a population from the territory of Normandy, a land to obtain its name through settlement by the same Normans, but where these Normans had become assimilated by the Gallo-Romance population of the shared lands.

== Bibliography ==
- Roberts, George (1834). The History and Antiquities of the Borough of Lyme Regis and Charmouth. S. Bagster and W. Pickering.
