= Burstock =

Village and civil parish in Dorset, England

Coordinates: 50.8232°N 2.8229°W

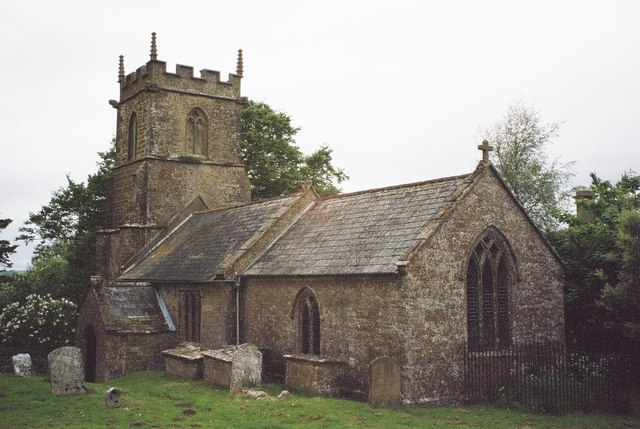
- Parish church of St Andrew

- Location within Dorset
- Population: 120
- OS grid reference: ST422029
- Unitary authority: Dorset
- Ceremonial county: Dorset
- Region: South West
- Country: England
- Sovereign state: United Kingdom
- Post town: Beaminster
- Postcode district: DT8
- Police: Dorset
- Fire: Dorset and Wiltshire
- Ambulance: South Western
- UK Parliament: West Dorset

Burstock is a village and civil parish in west Dorset, England, 5 miles (8.0 km) south of Crewkerne. In the 2011 census the parish had 59 dwellings, 49 households and a population of 120.

In 1086 Burstock was recorded in the Domesday Book as 'Bureuuinestoch', meaning a farm ('stoc') owned by either 'Burgwine' (a man) or 'Burgwynn' (a woman). It had 12 households, 8 acres of meadow and 3 ploughlands. It was in Whitchurch Canonicorum Hundred, the lord was William Malbank and the tenant-in-chief was Earl Hugh of Chester.

Before the Dissolution of the Monasteries in the mid 16th century, Burstock was closely associated with the Cistercian monks at nearby Forde Abbey; at Whetham, in the north of the parish, the abbey developed a mill, and in 1316 the Abbot became Burstock's lord of the manor.
