= Æthelstan's invasion of Scotland =

10th century military campaign

Athelstan’s invasion of Scotland
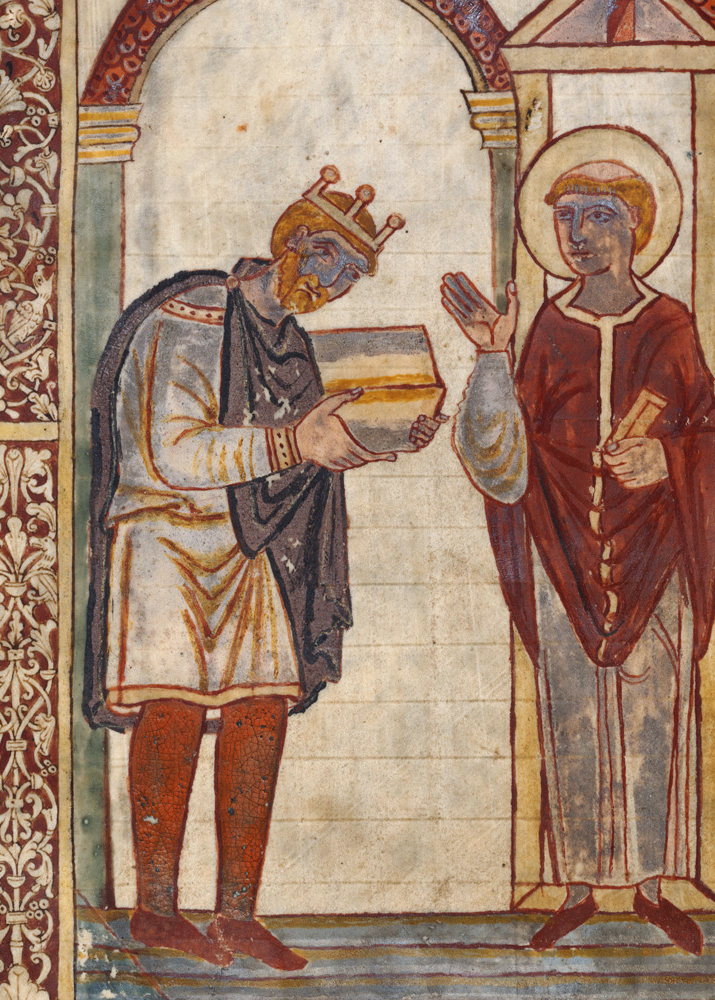
- King Athelstan of England
Date	28 May 934
Location	Scotland, United Kingdom, Europe
Result	Inconclusive; Constantine acknowledges Æthelstan's overlordship

Belligerents
England: Gwent; Deheubarth; Gwynedd; Brycheiniog	Scotland

Commanders and leaders
Athelstan	Constantine II

Casualties and losses
Unknown	Unknown

The English king Æthelstan invaded Scotland by land and sea with a large force in AD 934. No record of any battles fought during the invasion has survived and Æthelstan returned to England later in the year.

== Background ==
Æthelstan's reasons for mounting an invasion are unclear and historians give alternative explanations. According to one theory, Æthelstan was capitalizing on the deaths of two sources of opposition. Specifically, the death of his half-brother Edwin in 933 might have finally removed factions in Wessex opposed to his rule, while Guthfrith, the Norse king of Dublin who had briefly ruled Northumbria, had died in 934, meaning that any resulting insecurity among the Danes would have given Æthelstan an opportunity to stamp his authority on the north. A second theory concerns an entry in the Annals of Clonmacnoise, recording the death in 934 of a ruler who was possibly Ealdred of Bamburgh. This points to a dispute between Æthelstan and Constantine over control of his territory. The Anglo-Saxon Chronicle briefly recorded the expedition without explanation, but the twelfth-century chronicler John of Worcester stated that Constantine had broken his treaty with Æthelstan.

== The campaign ==
Æthelstan's campaign is reported in brief by the Anglo-Saxon Chronicle, and later chroniclers such as John of Worcester, William of Malmesbury, Henry of Huntingdon, and Symeon of Durham add detail to that bald account. Æthelstan's army began gathering at Winchester by 28 May 934, and travelled north to Nottingham by 7 June. He was accompanied by many leaders, including the Welsh kings Hywel Dda of Deheubarth, Idwal Foel of Gwynedd, Morgan ap Owain of Gwent, and Tewdwr ap Griffri of Brycheiniog. His retinue also included eighteen bishops and thirteen earls, six of whom were Danes from eastern England.

Æthelstan's army evidently travelled through Beverley and Ripon. By late June or early July the army had reached Chester-le-Street, where Æthelstan made generous gifts to the tomb of Cuthbert, including a stole and maniple (ecclesiastical garments) originally commissioned by his step-mother Ælfflæd as a gift to Bishop Frithestan of Winchester. The invasion was launched by land and sea. According to the twelfth-century chronicler Simeon of Durham, his land forces ravaged as far as Dunnottar and Fortriu in northern Scotland, while the fleet raided Caithness by which a much larger area, including Sutherland, is probably intended. Caithness was then probably part of the Norse kingdom of Orkney. Owain was defeated and it is unlikely that Constantine's personal authority extended so far north, so Æthelstan's attacks were probably directed at Constantine's allies, comprising simple looting expeditions.

The Annals of Clonmacnoise state that "the Scottish men compelled [Æthelstan] to return without any great victory", while Henry of Huntingdon claims that the English faced no opposition. A negotiated settlement might have ended matters: according to John of Worcester, a son of Constantine was given as a hostage to Æthelstan and Constantine himself accompanied the English king on his return south.

== Political effects ==
No battles are recorded during the campaign, and chronicles do not record its outcome. By September, however, Æthelstan was back in the south of England at Buckingham, where Constantine witnessed a charter as subregulus, that is a king acknowledging Æthelstan's overlordship.

The following year, in 935, Constantine was again in England at Æthelstan's court, this time at Cirencester where he appears as a witness to a charter along with Owain of Strathclyde, Hywel Dda, Idwal Foel, and Morgan ap Owain. At Christmas of the same year Owain of Strathclyde was once more at Æthelstan's court along with the Welsh kings, but Constantine was not. His return to England less than two years later at the Battle of Brunanburh as Æthelstan's opponent would be in very different circumstances.
