= Heswall =

Town on the Wirral Peninsula, England

Coordinates: 53.328°N 3.099°W

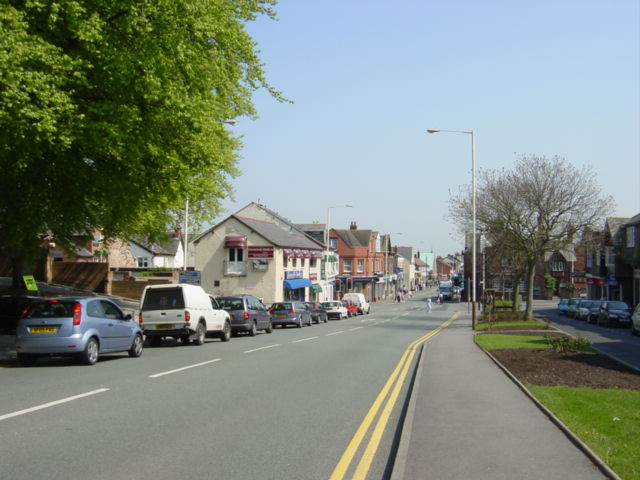
- Telegraph Road

- Location within Merseyside
- Population: 29,075 (Built up area, 2021)
- OS grid reference: SJ269818
  - London: 178 mi (286 km) SE
- Metropolitan borough: Wirral
- Metropolitan county: Merseyside
- Region: North West
- Country: England
- Sovereign state: United Kingdom
- Post town: WIRRAL
- Postcode district: CH60
- Dialling code: 0151
- ISO 3166 code: GB-WRL
- Police: Merseyside
- Fire: Merseyside
- Ambulance: North West
- UK Parliament: Wirral West

Heswall (/ˈhɛzwəl, -wɔːl/) is a town on the Wirral Peninsula, England. Historically part of the county of Cheshire, it became part of the Metropolitan Borough of Wirral in the county of Merseyside in 1974, following local government reorganisation. At the time of the 2021 census, the population of the built up area, as defined by the Office for National Statistics, was 29,075.

== History ==
=== Early history ===
Before the Norman Conquest, Heswall has been cited as a possible location for Dingesmere, mentioned with regard to the Battle of Brunanburh, in Egil's Saga. Heswall was recorded in the Domesday Book of 1086 as Eswelle, owned by Robert de Rodelent, who also owned much of the land on the eastern side of the River Dee. In 1277, it became the property of Patrick de Haselwall, who was Sheriff of Cheshire.

=== Development ===
In 1801, the population was recorded as 168. By 1841, this had grown to 398. Before 1897, the town was known as Hestlewelle or Hesselwell. Its urban development began with wealthy merchants from Liverpool, who had intended to as a retreat. However, the arrival of two railway connections facilitated a regular commute to and from Heswall. The Borderlands Line between Wrexham Central and Bidston was opened in 1896 and remains active today. Heswall railway station is served by this line and is located at the eastern edge of the town. The station was formerly called Heswall Hills to distinguish it from the older, now demolished, Heswall station on Station Road in the area’s historic centre, now known as the Lower Village, on a different line between West Kirby and Hooton. This opened in 1886 but was closed to passengers in 1956. The old railway track became a public footpath, the Wirral Way.

The rapid development of Heswall since the 19th century has resulted in the once-separate towns and villages of Gayton, Heswall, Pensby and Thingwall becoming joined by continuous housing.

=== Lower Heswall Conservation Area ===
Designated a conservation area in 1979, Heswall's lower village, the original centre of the settlement, was once just a small fishing village. After the arrival of the railway in the late 1800s, significant urban expansion shifted the landscape across Heswall. The Lower Village conservation area includes the old village centre itself which, combined with its immediate surroundings, forms an area known locally as Lower Heswall.

In contrast to Heswall’s busier town centre around Telegraph Road, Lower Heswall is characterised by its steep, narrow lanes, open spaces, leafy residential roads, period architecture and views across the Dee Estuary. It is contiguous with Gayton and within walking distance to Heswall town centre and its commuter links.

=== Architecture ===
The oldest structure is the tower of St Peter's Parish Church. Located in Lower Heswall, it is about 500 years old. The present-day church was built in 1879 and is the third to have been built on the site. The previous church was destroyed by a violent thunderstorm on 19 September 1875, during which the organist and the boy who pumped the bellows for the organ were both killed.

Gayton windmill, which ceased operations in 1860, has since been converted into a house and can be seen from the area surrounding the Gayton Roundabout and Devon Doorway pub, which lies a short distance from Heswall’s town centre, at the southern end of Telegraph Road.

The former Royal Liverpool Children's Hospital originally opened in Heswall as Liverpool Country Hospital for Children in 1909. The hospital was situated on a 3.5-hectare (9-acre) site purchased in 1900. It stood opposite The Puddydale on Telgraph Road with grounds overlooking the Dee estuary. The hospital closed in 1985 and the building is now occupied by a Tesco supermarket. The building was extended in the early 2000s and refurbished during 2011. The clock tower of the original hospital remains part of the building.

== Governance ==
There is one main tier of local government covering Heswall, at metropolitan borough level: Wirral Borough Council. The council is a member of the Liverpool City Region Combined Authority, which is led by the directly elected Mayor of the Liverpool City Region.

=== Administrative history ===
Heswall was an ancient parish in the Wirral Hundred of Cheshire. The parish was subdivided into two townships: Heswall-cum-Oldfield and Gayton. From the 17th century onwards, parishes were gradually given various civil functions under the poor laws, in addition to their original ecclesiastical functions. In some cases, including Heswall, the civil functions were exercised by each township separately rather than the parish as a whole. In 1866, the legal definition of 'parish' was changed to be the areas used for administering the poor laws, and so the townships also became civil parishes.

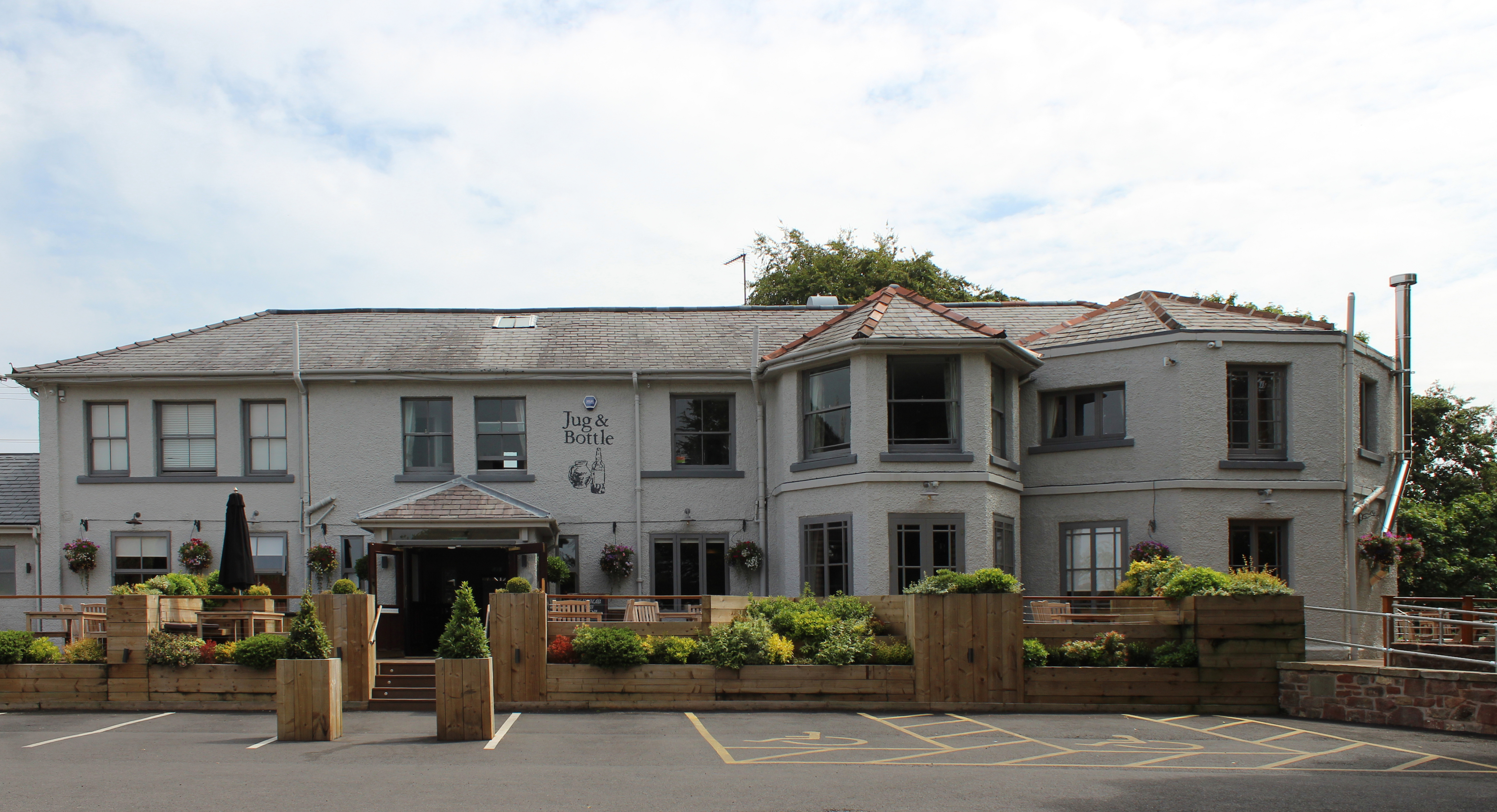
Jug & Bottle, formerly Hill House. Headquarters of Wirral Urban District Council from 1936 to 1974

When elected parish and district councils were established in 1894, Heswall-cum-Oldfield was given a parish council and included in the Wirral Rural District. The parish council was abolished in 1933, when the remaining part of the Wirral district (after it had ceded territory to various urban neighbours) was reconstituted as the Wirral Urban District. Heswall was the largest settlement in the district, and the urban district council chose to base itself there, buying a large house called Hill House in 1936 to serve as its headquarters.

Wirral Urban District was abolished in 1974 under the Local Government Act 1972. The area became part of the Metropolitan Borough of Wirral in the new county of Merseyside.

== Geography ==
Located on the eastern side of the Dee Estuary, with views across the river to North Wales, Heswall is 13 miles (21 kilometres) from Chester and 10 miles (16 kilometres) from Liverpool (via the Queensway (Birkenhead) Tunnel or 56 miles (90 kilometres) (avoiding the tunnels). The towers of Liverpool's cathedrals can be seen on the horizon from the town. As of the 2021 census it has a population density of 2,855/km².

== Economy ==
An affluent area, Heswall was listed as the seventh richest neighbourhood in the UK in 2001. In 2018, it was also named the fourth best place to live in the North West by the Sunday Times. In 2022, the median house price in Heswall made it the most expensive in the Wirral area.

== Open spaces ==
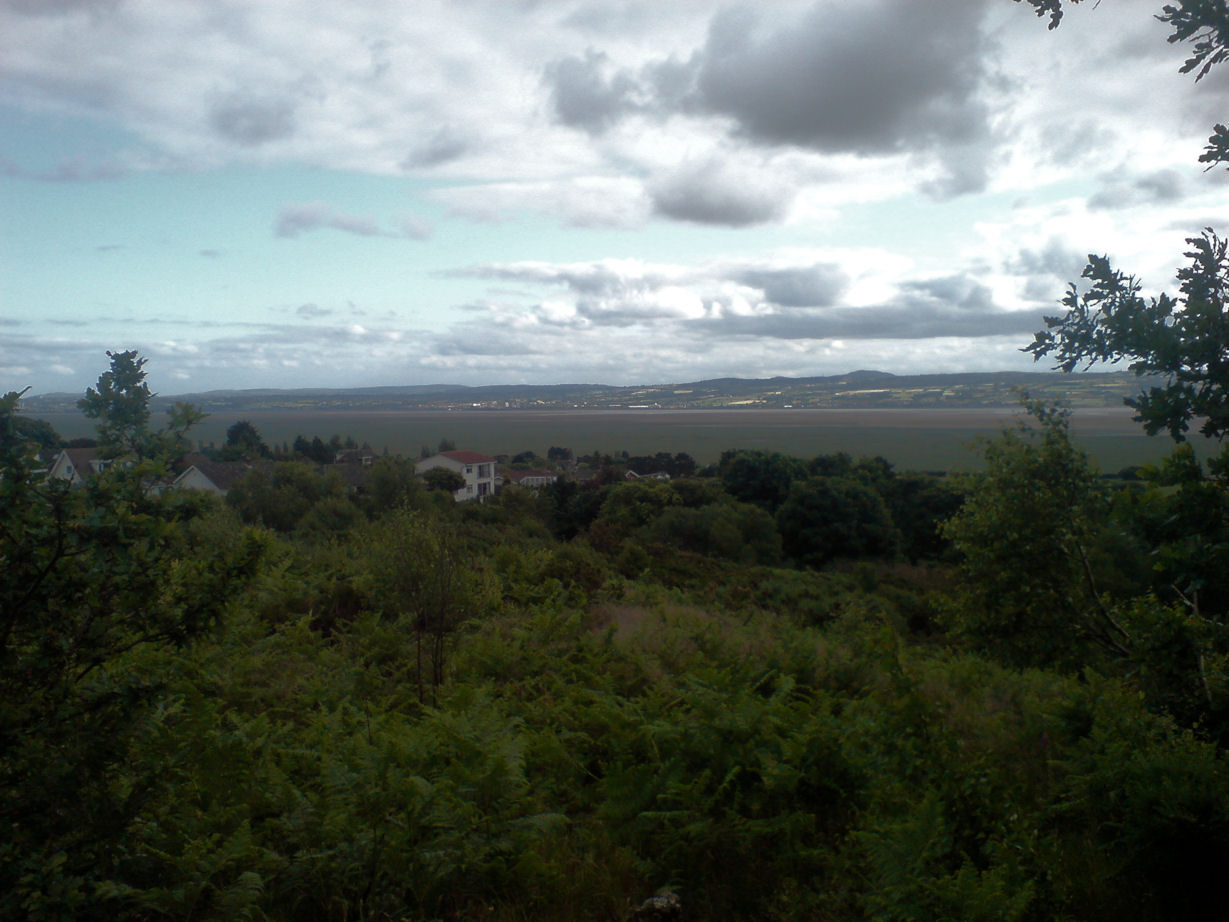
Heswall Dales, with views across the Dee Estuary to North Wales

=== Heswall Dales ===
The largest area of open space in the area is the Dales, a dry, sandy heathland overlooking the Dee Estuary. It has both Site of Special Scientific Interest (SSSI) and Local Nature Reserve (LNR) status. Within this SSSI lies 'the Dungeon', a small river valley cut into the hillside. A path connects the Dales to the Wirral Way and the coast.

=== Dawstone Park ===
A manicured public garden with views across the Dee Estuary. Dawstone Park contains flower beds, trees, lawned areas and picnic tables.

=== The Wirral Way ===
Heswall is also located along the Wirral Way, a public footpath within Wirral Country Park which links West Kirby to Hooton along the trackbed of the old Birkenhead railway route.

=== The Beacons ===
An open area also overlooking the Dee.

=== Whitfield Common ===
Located off Whitfield Lane, the area contains open land as well as playing fields and tennis courts.

== Education ==
Heswall is well served by St Peter's C of E, Gayton, Heswall and Barnston Primary Schools.

Pensby High School is the local secondary school situated in nearby Pensby.

=== Heswall Primary School ===
Heswall Primary School serves the local community of Heswall and surrounding areas on the Wirral Peninsula. It opened in 1909. It was originally on the eastern edge of The Puddydale, opposite the Royal Liverpool Children's hospital on Telegraph Road (now converted into a local Tesco). The original building was demolished in 1982 after falling into disrepair. Prior to demolition, the juniors were moved to the current Whitfield Lane site in 1976 and the school became known as Whitfield Primary School. The infants joined the juniors in 1982, unifying the school on one site again – eventually becoming Heswall County Primary school.

The current Whitfield Lane site was formerly the location of the Beehive Dairy. The school has retained the Beehive logo in its school badge. The single form entry school has around 220 children on roll. Now known as Heswall Primary School, the school is surrounded by the Barnston fields and has its own field and wooded areas.

The school is the home of Wirral Science Under the Stars, an event run by the school that brings together science links in real life settings with education.

There is also Gayton preschool, which is located in lower Heswall; in Gayton, as well as being a preschool it also offers primary school, it is council funded.

== Transport ==
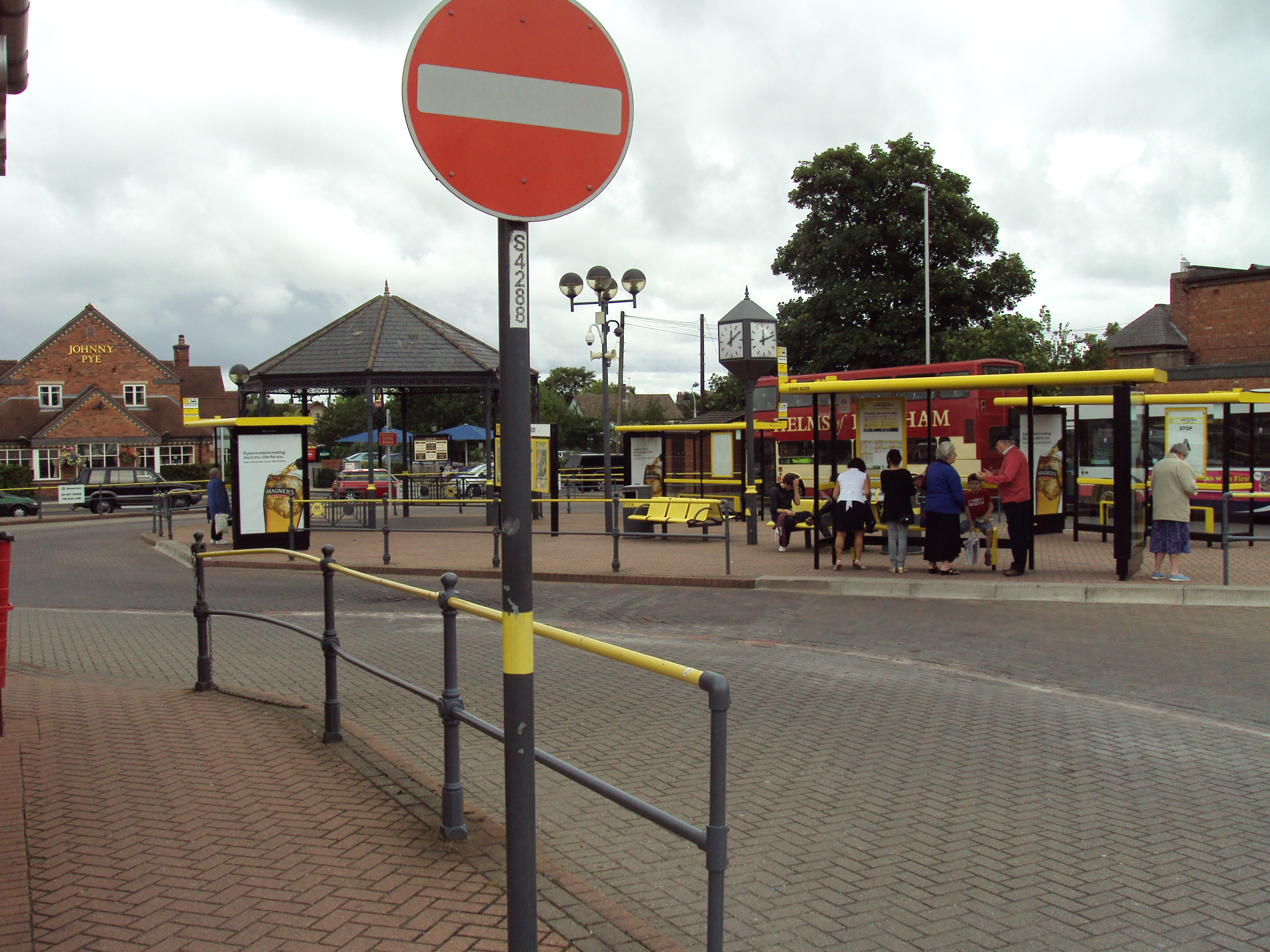
Heswall bus station

=== Bus ===
Heswall bus station is owned and managed by Merseytravel and comprises four bus stops. The bus routes are primarily operated by Arriva North West, Stagecoach Merseyside & South Lancashire, Al's Coaches, A2B Travel and Aintree Coachlines. Routes provide direct links to several locations across the Wirral, as well as Liverpool and Chester city centres.

=== Rail ===
Heswall railway station is served by the Borderlands Line, operated by Transport for Wales. The line runs northbound from Wrexham Central to Bidston, where it terminates to enable connection services to the Wirral Line of the Merseyrail network between West Kirby and Liverpool.

The town was previously served by a second railway station between 1886 and 1956. The old track was converted to what is now the Wirral Way, a country path linking West Kirby to Hooton, passing through Heswall along the same route as the previous railway line.

== Media ==
Local news and television programmes are provided by BBC North West and ITV Granada. Television signals are received from the Winter Hill TV transmitter. Heswall's close proximity to North Wales means that BBC Wales and ITV Cymru Wales can also be received from the Moel-y-Parc TV transmitter.

Local radio stations are BBC Radio Merseyside, Capital North West & Wales, Heart North West, Smooth Radio North West, Greatest Hits Radio Liverpool & The North West, Hits Radio Liverpool and Wirral Wave Radio, a community-based station.

The town's local newspapers are the Liverpool Echo and the Wirral Globe.

== Sport ==
=== Heswall Lawn Tennis Club ===
Located on Quarry Road East for over 100 years, the club competes in the Cheshire Lawn Tennis Association's Inter-Club League.

=== Heswall Golf Club ===
Located on Cottage Lane, the club was founded in 1902 and has an 18-hole championship golf course.

=== Heswall Football Club ===
Heswall F.C., founded in 1891, plays at Gayton Park on Brimstage Road. They compete in the West Cheshire Association Football League.

== In popular culture ==
Heswall Village Fete is the scene for Coldplay's "Life in Technicolor II" music video.

Heswall is the destination on the front of a bus in the 2014 John Lewis Christmas advert, 'Monty The Penguin'.

Heswall Flower Club is mentioned in the song "The Bane of Constance" by the band Half Man Half Biscuit on their 2014 album Urge For Offal.

== Notable people ==
- Musician Ian Astbury, lead singer of rock band The Cult, was born in Heswall.
- Cricketer Ian Botham (Lord Botham) was born in Heswall.
- TV presenter Jim Bowen was born in Heswall.
- England, Everton and Sunderland footballer Paul Bracewell was born in Heswall.
- TV presenter Fiona Bruce lived in Heswall and was educated at Gayton Primary School.
- Christian Furr, the youngest artist to have officially painted Queen Elizabeth II, was born in Heswall.
- Pianist Stephen Hough CBE is from Heswall.
- Philip May, husband of former Prime Minister Theresa May, is from Heswall, where he was educated at Heswall Primary School and later Calday Grange Grammar School in West Kirby. The May family lived on Downham Road North for 16 years.
- In 1964, Paul McCartney purchased Rembrandt, a detached Tudor-style residence on Baskervyle Road, for his father, Jim McCartney, at the cost of £8,750. The senior McCartney later moved to a bungalow nearby and lived in Heswall until his death on 18 March 1976.
- Musician Andy McCluskey, singer, bass guitarist and co-founder of the electronic band Orchestral Manoeuvres in the Dark (OMD), was born in Heswall and educated at Calday Grange Grammar School in West Kirby.
- Hugh O'Leary, accountant and husband of former UK Prime MinisterLiz Truss is from Heswall
- Disc jockey and broadcaster John Peel was born in Heswall.
- Bill Steer, British guitar player, and co-founder of the extreme metal band Carcass, spent his teenage years living in Heswall, and went to Heswall Primary School on Whitfield Lane.
- John Williams (27 May 1946 – 12 August 1978), English motorcycle short-circuit road racer who also entered selected Grands Prix, was from Heswall and lived on Whitfield Lane.

== See also ==
- Listed buildings in Heswall
