= George Roberts (antiquary) =

George Roberts (died 1860) was an English schoolmaster and antiquary.

== Life ==
Roberts was born at Lyme Regis in Dorset, where he was mainly educated. He then kept a grammar school there in Broad Street, Henry Parry Liddon being one of his pupils.

Roberts acted as mayor of Lyme Regis in 1848–9 and 1854–5. From a young age he devoted himself to the history of the place and studied its archives. He became known for his knowledge of local history.

Roberts corresponded with Sir Walter Scott, and Thomas Babington Macaulay quoted him as an authority on Monmouth's Rebellion. Hepworth Dixon, in his Life of Admiral Blake, acknowledged obligations to Roberts. Around 1857 he moved to Dover, where he died on 27 May 1860, aged 57.

== Works ==
Roberts published:

- The History of Lyme Regis, 1823.
- A Guide descriptive of the Beauties of Lyme Regis, with a Description of the Great Storm [of 23 Nov.] 1824, already published in the Sherborne Mercury, and issued separately (1830).
- History and Antiquities of the Borough of Lyme Regis and Charmouth, 1834. Two editions were issued, one of them with a tract on The Municipal Government of Lyme Regis and an Account of the Corporation, which was also issued separately.
- Etymological and Explanatory Dictionary of the Terms and Language of Geology, 1839.
- Account of the Mighty Landslip at Dowlands and Bindon, near Lyme Regis, on 25 Dec. 1839 (1840). This tract went through five editions that year.
- Terms and Language of Trade and Commerce, 1841.
- Life, Progresses, and Rebellion of James, Duke of Monmouth, with a full Account of the Bloody Assize, 1844, 2 vols.
- The Social History of the People of the Southern Counties of England in Past Centuries,’ 1856, dedicated to Macaulay, and mainly based on the archives of Lyme Regis and Weymouth, the proceedings of the Dorset County Sessions, 1625–37, and the proceedings before the Dorchester magistrates, 1654–1661.

Roberts edited for the Camden Society in 1848 the Diary of Walter Yonge of Colyton. On his account, the History of the Mutiny at Spithead and the Nore (1842), of William Johnson Neale, was modified from a manuscript of his.

== Notes ==
Attribution

This article incorporates text from a publication now in the public domain: Lee, Sidney, ed. (1896). "Roberts, George (d.1860)". Dictionary of National Biography. Vol. 48. London: Smith, Elder & Co.
