= Heswall Dales =

Lowland heath and Site of Special Scientific Interest near Heswall, Wirral, England

- Site of Special Scientific Interest
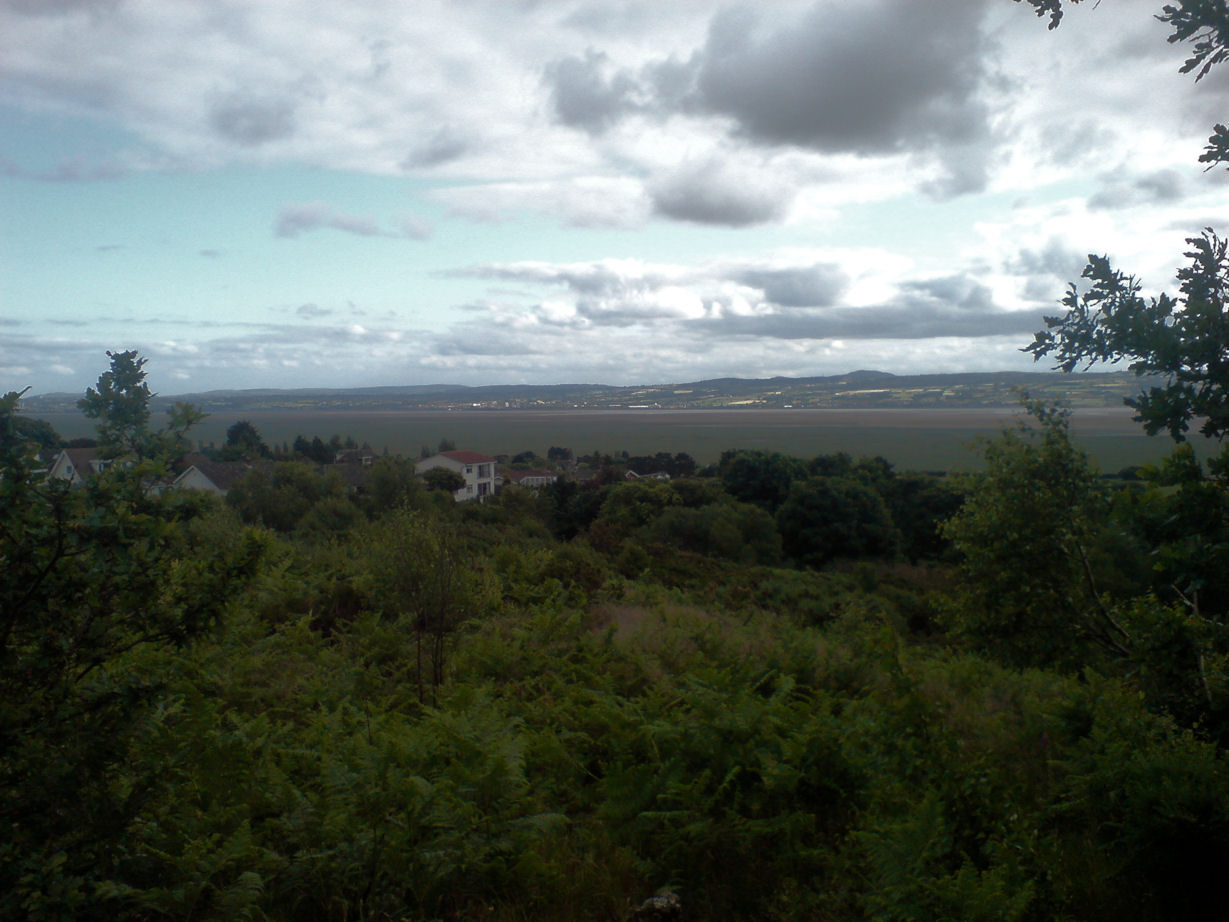
- Heswall Dales in 2008, overlooking the River Dee

- Location within Merseyside
- Location of Heswall Dales.
- Area of search: Merseyside
- Grid reference: SJ261821
- Coordinates: 53.330°N 3.116°W
- Interest: Biological
- Area: 29.6 ha (73 acres)
- Notification date: 1979 / 1983

Heswall Dales is an area of some 72 acres (290,000 m^{2}) of lowland heath situated close to Heswall on the Wirral Peninsula, England.

It is a Site of Special Scientific Interest and a Local Nature Reserve. Heswall Dales offers views of the Dee Estuary and over the River Dee the Clwydian Hills of Wales.

All land within Heswall Dales SSSI is owned by the local authority.
