= Morcombelake =

Village in Dorset, England

Coordinates: 50.74361°N 2.85153°W

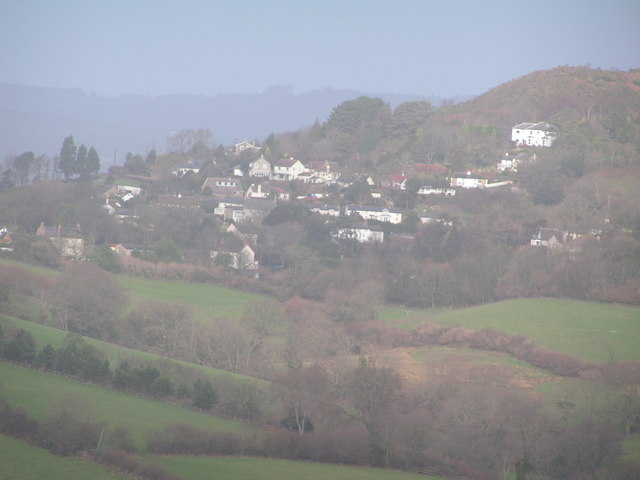
- Morcombelake as seen from Golden Cap

- Location within Dorset
- OS grid reference: SY405938
- Unitary authority: Dorset
- Ceremonial county: Dorset
- Region: South West
- Country: England
- Sovereign state: United Kingdom
- Postcode district: DT
- Dialling code: 01297
- Police: Dorset
- Fire: Dorset and Wiltshire
- Ambulance: South Western
- UK Parliament: West Dorset

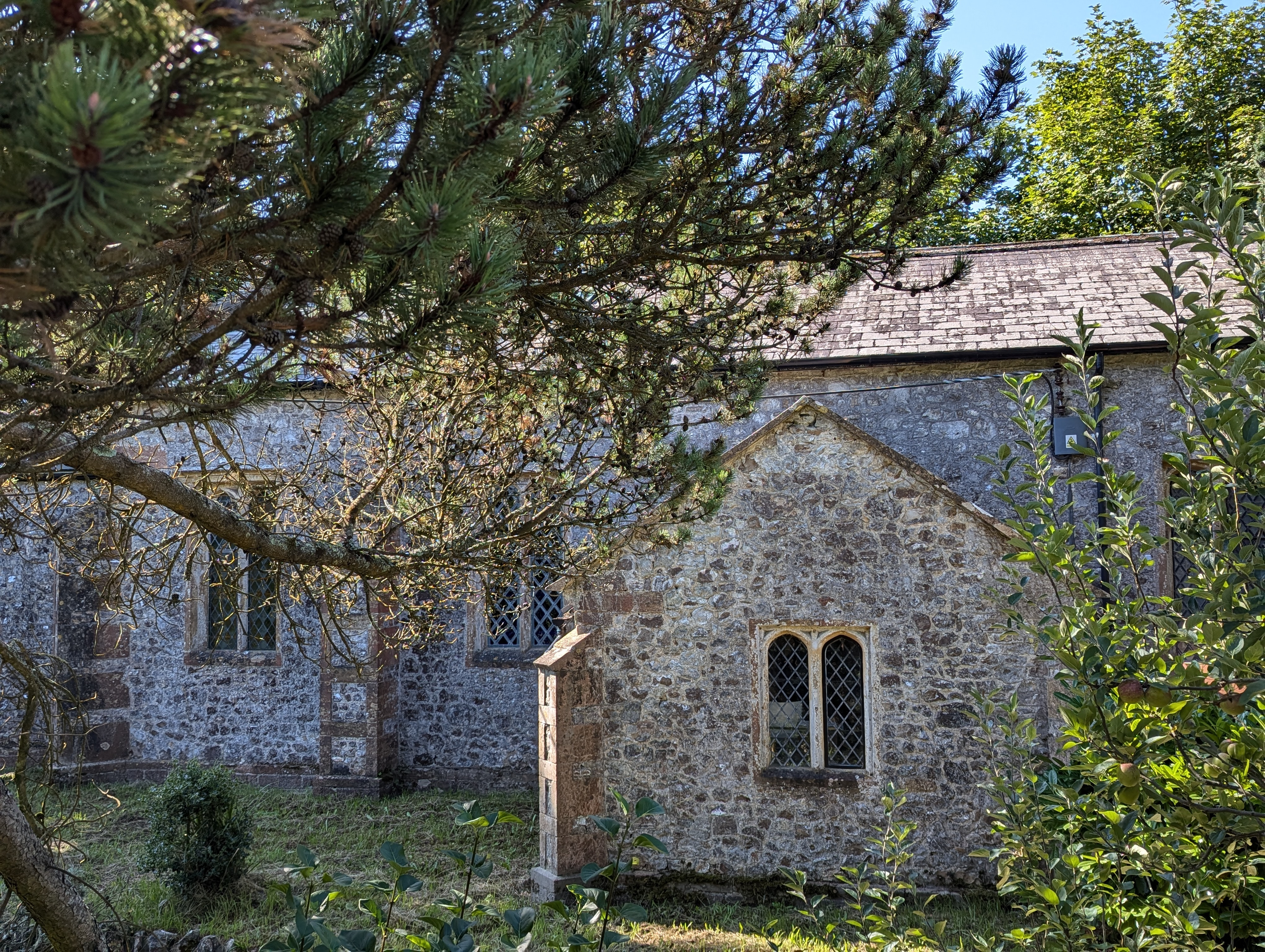
St. Gabriel's church, Morcombelake, Dorset, England.

Morcombelake (also spelled Morecombelake) is a small village near Bridport in Dorset, England, within the ancient parish of Whitchurch Canonicorum. Golden Cap, part of the Jurassic Coast World Heritage Site, is nearby.

It has a small stone church, St. Gabriel, built 1840-1841, which contains some re-used components salvaged from an earlier chapel nearby that had the same name.

The village was at one time the location of a bakery that made "Moores Famous Dorset Biscuits" a Dorset Knob, since 1880 although manufacturing moved in 2007 to nearby Bridport. The bakery buildings remain although currently disused.

The busy A35 road runs through the small hamlet.

== Politics ==
In the UK national parliament, Morcombelake is within the West Dorset parliamentary constituency. As of 2024, the Member of Parliament (MP) is Edward Morello of the Liberal Democrats.

After 2019 structural changes to local government in England, Morcombelake is part of the Marshwood Vale ward which elects 1 member to Dorset Council.
