= Catherston Leweston =

Village in Dorset, England

Coordinates: 50.746°N 2.8947°W

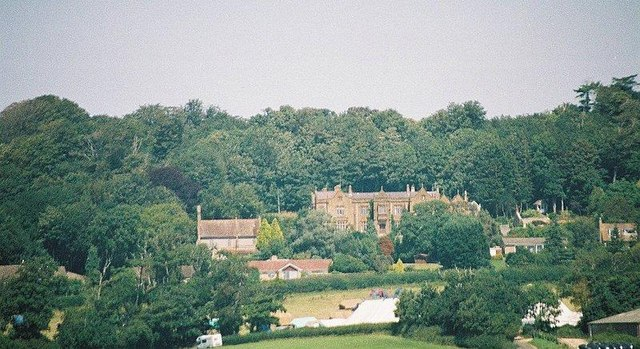
- Catherston Leweston viewed from the south

- Location within Dorset
- Population: 30
- Unitary authority: Dorset
- Ceremonial county: Dorset
- Region: South West
- Country: England
- Sovereign state: United Kingdom
- Post town: BRIDPORT
- Postcode district: DT6
- Dialling code: 01297
- Police: Dorset
- Fire: Dorset and Wiltshire
- Ambulance: South Western
- UK Parliament: West Dorset

Catherston Leweston is a small village and civil parish in the county of Dorset in southwest England. It lies approximately 2 miles (3.2 km) northeast of Lyme Regis. The Dorset County Council estimated that the population of the parish was 30(as of 2013).

The village's Tudor-style manor house was built in 1887 and the Blue Lias-built church dates from 1858. Part of an earlier medieval manor house belonging to the Wadham family of Catherston, a cadet branch of the family that founded Wadham College, Oxford, remains beside the later house.
