= List of Welsh flags =

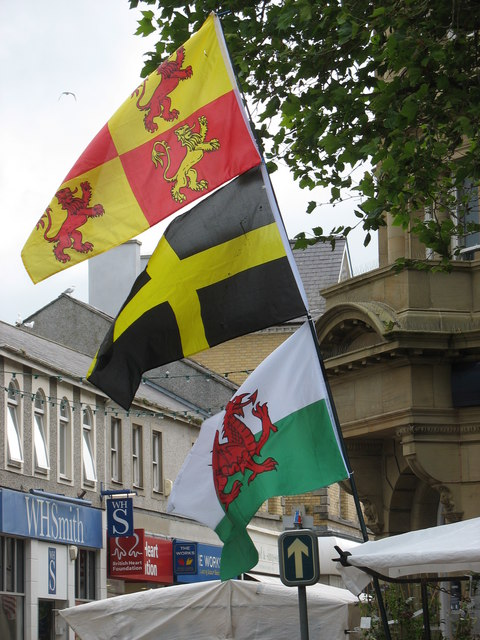
Three Welsh flags, as flown in Caernarfon. Top to bottom: Owain Glyndŵr flag, Flag of Saint David, and the Flag of Wales.

This is a list of flags that are used exclusively in Wales. Other flags used in Wales, as well as the rest of the United Kingdom can be found at list of British flags.

== National flags ==
Flag	Date	Use	Description
	Since 1959 (official)(variants first appeared c.1485)	Flag of Wales, also known as Y Ddraig Goch ('the red dragon')	Per fess Argent and Vert, a dragon passant Gules
	Since 1959 (official)(variants first appeared c.1485)	Flag of Wales, also known as Y Ddraig Goch ('the red dragon')	A vertical per fess Argent and Vert, a dragon passant Gules
	Since 1921	Flag of Saint David	Sable a cross Or

== Royal standards of the United Kingdom ==
Flag	Date	Use	Description
	Since 1837	The Royal Standard, used by King Charles III in England, Wales and Northern Ireland	A banner of the King's Arms, the Royal Coat of Arms of the United Kingdom, blazoned Quarterly, I and IV Gules three lions passant guardant in pale Or; II Or a lion rampant within a double tressure flory-counter-flory Gules; III Azure a harp Or stringed Argent
		Standard of the Prince of Wales, used only in Wales	A banner based on the arms of the last native Prince of Wales, Llywelyn the Great, with the Prince of Wales's coronet in the centre, blazoned Quarterly Or and Gules four lions passant guardant counterchanged armed and langued Azure, over all an inescutcheon Vert charged with the coronet of the Heir Apparent

== Government flags ==
Flag	Date	Use	Description
	Since 2017	The ensign used aboard ships of the Welsh Government, such as the patrol boats of the Marine and Fisheries Division.	A British Blue Ensign defaced with a yellow dragon
		Corporate banner of Senedd Cymru.	White with the emblem of Senedd Cymru in red
		Corporate banner of the Welsh Government.	Red with the logo of the Welsh Government in white

== Religious ==
Flag	Date	Use	Description
	Since 1921	Flag of Saint David	Sable a cross Or
	Since 1954	Flag of the Church in Wales	Argent a cross Azure a celtic cross proper
	1920 – 1954	Unofficial Flag of the Church in Wales	A reversed Saint David's cross

=== Dioceses of the Church in Wales ===
Flag	Date	Use	Description
		Flag of the Diocese of Bangor	A banner of the Diocese's coat of arms.
		Flag of the Diocese of St Asaph	A banner of the Diocese's coat of arms.
		Flag of the Diocese of St Davids	A banner of the Diocese's coat of arms.
		Flag of the Diocese of Swansea and Brecon	A banner of the Diocese's coat of arms.

== Historical ==
=== Welsh flags ===
Flag	Date	Use	Description
	1807 – 1953	Used from 1807 until 1953.	
	1953 – 1959	Used from 1953 until 1959, depicting the Royal Badge of Wales after its augmentation of honour.	

=== Welsh royal standards ===
Flag	Date	Use	Description
	1195 – 1378	Banner adopted by Owain Glyndŵr and thought to be derived from the counter-charged arms of the princely Houses of Mathrafal and Dinefwr. It is currently in use by the National Eisteddfod for Wales, Cymdeithas yr Iaith and widely amongst pro-independence groups	Quarterly Or and Gules, four Lions rampant counter-charged
	1100 – 1378	Banner of the princely House of Aberffraw and the Kingdom of Gwynedd famously used by Llywelyn the Great, Llywelyn ap Gruffudd and Owain Lawgoch. The Prince of Wales uses a version of this flag today, emblazoned with a Crown on a green shield	Quarterly Or and Gules, four Lions passant guardant counter-charged langued and armed Azure
	c.987 – c.1034	Banner of the princely House of Mathrafal used during the early Middle Ages by the rulers of Powys, Powys Wenwynwyn and later by their heirs the de la Pole (Powysian) dynasty. Modern use is rare	Or a Lion rampant Gules langued and armed Azure
	c.1034 – c.1195	Banner of the princely House of Dinefwr and the Kingdom of Deheubarth, a realm which covered much of south Wales. The banner would have been used during the early Middle Ages and later by the Talbot dynasty who inherited the arms. Modern use is rare	Gules a Lion rampant Or, a border engrailed of the last
	c.1267 - 1282	Banner of the personal arms of Llywelyn ap Gruffudd	Argent three Lions passant Gules
	c.567 – c.897	Banner of Madog ap Gruffudd Maelor, and later the Banner of Powys Fadog	Argent a Lion rampant Sable langued and armed Gules. Often referred to as the Black Lion of Powys.

=== Battle flags ===
Flag	Date	Use	Description
	c.1400 – c.1416	Banner known as Y Ddraig Aur or "The Golden Dragon" which has ancient origins. It was famously raised over Caernarfon during the Battle of Tuthill in 1401 by Owain Glyndŵr	Argent a dragon rampant Or
	13th century	Banner known as Y Groes Nawdd or "The Cross of Neith" said to have been the battle flag of Llywelyn ap Gruffudd (d. 1282)	Purpure a celtic cross Or

=== Religious flags ===
Flag	Date	Use	Description
	pre – 1954	Unofficial flag of the Diocese of Bangor	An inverted Saint David's Cross with the arms of the Diocese in the canton.
	pre – 1954	Unofficial flag of the Diocese of Llandaff	An inverted Saint David's Cross with the arms of the Diocese in the canton.
	pre – 1954	Unofficial flag of the Diocese of Monmouth	An inverted Saint David's Cross with the arms of the Diocese in the canton.
	pre – 1954	Unofficial flag of the Diocese of St Asaph	An inverted Saint David's Cross with the arms of the Diocese in the canton.
	pre – 1954	Unofficial flag of the Diocese of St Davids	An inverted Saint David's Cross with the arms of the Diocese in the canton.
	pre – 1954	Unofficial flag of the Diocese of Swansea and Brecon	An inverted Saint David's Cross with the arms of the Diocese in the canton.

=== Other flags ===
Flag	Date	Use	Description
	1910–1913	Variant flag of Wales used during the British Antarctic Expedition.	

== Regions, counties and cities ==
=== Traditional counties ===
Of the 13 historic counties, seven have flags registered with the Flag Institute, with Brecknockshire, Cardiganshire (now Ceredigion), Carmarthenshire, Denbighshire, Montgomeryshire and Radnorshire outstanding.

Flag	Date	Use	Description
	March 2014	Flag of Anglesey	Gules a chevron Or between three lions rampant Or.
	Not yet registered	De facto flag of Brecknockshire	Sable a bat Azure displayed on a fess cottised Or.
	Since 2012	Flag of Caernarfonshire	Vert, three eagles displayed in fess Or.
	Not yet registered	De facto flag of Cardiganshire	Sable, a lion regardant Or.
	Since 2015	Flag of Flintshire	Argent a Cross fleury engrailed Sable between four Cornish Choughs proper
	Since 2013	Flag of Glamorgan	Gules, three Chevronels Argent
	Since 2015	Flag of Merionethshire	Azure, three goats rampant Argent, armed and unguled Or; from the dexter base the sun in his splendour issuant Or.
	Since 2011	Flag of Monmouthshire	Per pale Azure and Sable three Fleurs-de-lis Or.
	Since 1988	Flag of Pembrokeshire	Azure a cross Or on an inescutcheon of five Vert a Tudor Rose quarterly counter-changed Argent and Gules.

=== Cities, towns and villages ===
Flag	Date	Use	Description
	1906	Flag of Cardiff	Argent on a Mount Vert a Dragon rampant Gules supporting in front of a Leek issuing from the Mount a Flag Staff erect proper flying therefrom to the sinister a Banner of the third charged with three Chevronels of the first.
	2013	Flag of Craig-y-Dorth	Two golden wyverns couchant facing each other as in battle; one on a blue background and the other on a red background.
	2022	Flag of Llandovery	
	2015	Flag of Monmouth	
	2022	Flag of St Asaph	
	2013	Flag of Tywyn	

== University flags ==
Flag	Date	Use	Description
		Flag of Bangor University	
		Flag of Swansea University	A banner of the University's coat of arms.
		Flag of Wrexham University (Glyndŵr University)	A banner of the University's coat of arms.

== House flags ==
Flag	Date	Use	Description
		House flag of Cory Brothers	A horizontal bicolour of white and green, defaced in the centre with a pink Welsh dragon holding two overlapping black diamonds (representing lumps of coal) with a smaller white diamond (inscribed with the name "CORY BROTHERS") in the middle.
	1882–1981	House flag of Evan Thomas, Radcliffe and Company	

== Nationalist flags ==
Flag	Date	Use	Description
	1950s–1960s	Flag of the Welsh Republican Movement	A vertical tricolour of green, red and white
	1960s-1980s	Welsh socialist republican tricolour, adopted by the Welsh Socialist Republican Movement	A vertical tricolour of green, red and white with a black star representing those who have fallen for their country
	1960s	Flag of the Free Wales Army	A stylised heraldic white eagle on a black field, designed by the Welsh republican poet Harri Webb
	1960s	Flag of the National Patriotic Front	A horizontal tricolour of white, red and green with a black band in the hoist containing a gold Y Nod Cyfrin based on the Awen
	2000s	Y Ddraig Ddu or "The Black Dragon" used by the Cymru 1400 republican movement	The Welsh Dragon on a black field
	2010s-2020s	Flag of YesCymru, pro-independence campaign organisation	YesCymru's logo displayed in white on a red field
	2010s-2020s	Cofiwch Dryweryn flag to commemorate the flooding of Tryweryn	The slogan "Cofiwch Dryweryn" ('Remember Tryweryn') in white on a field of red
	2020s	Flag of Mudiad Eryr Wen, Welsh republican nationalist youth movement	A horizontal Welsh republican tricolour, accompanied by a vertical black band on the hoist featuring Harri Webb's Eryr Wen at the top
