= County flags =

Several countries and regions have flag-bearing counties:

- Flags of counties of England
- Flags of counties of Liberia
- Flags of counties of Scotland
- Flags of counties of Wales
