= Mudiad Eryr Wen =

Welsh nationalist organisation

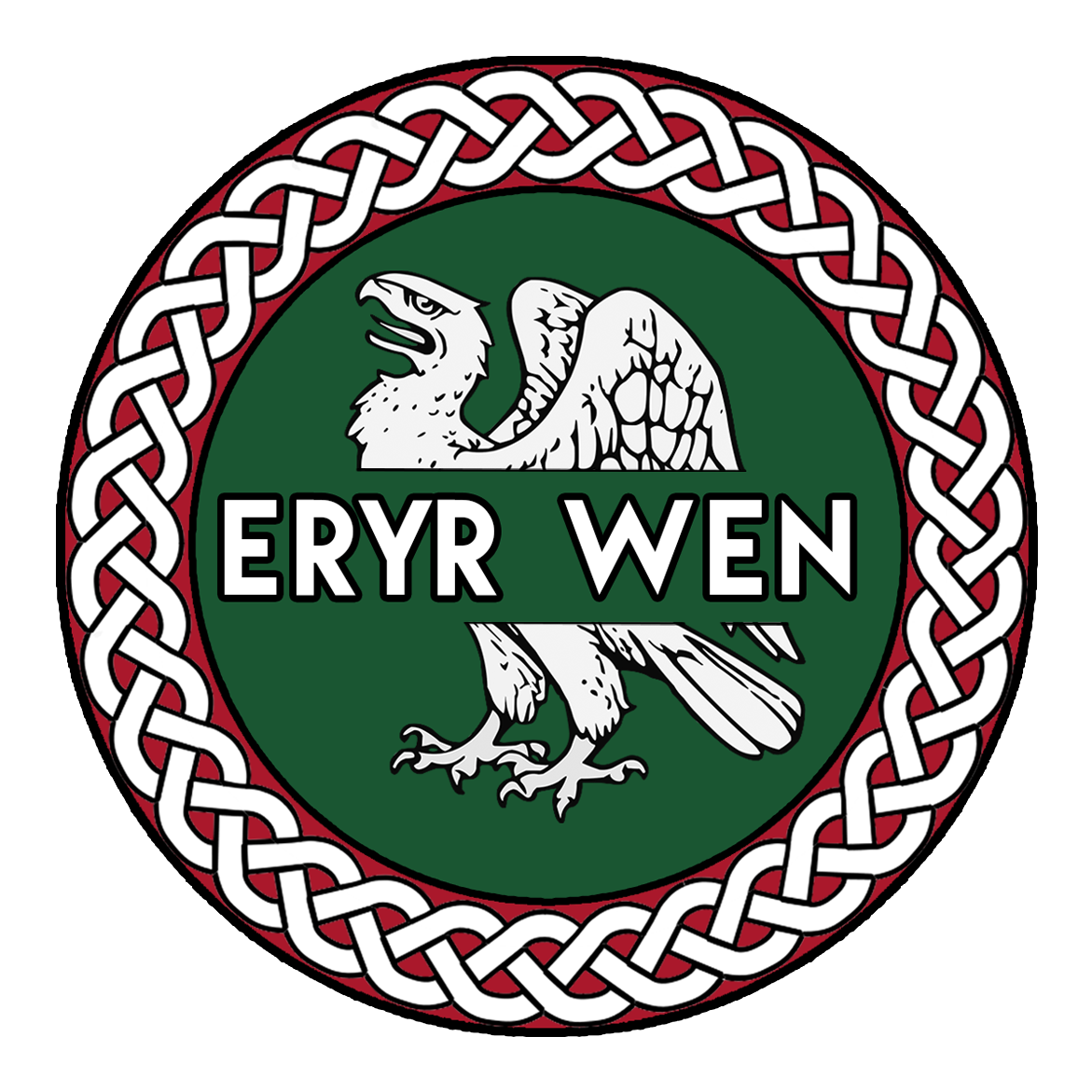
- Abbreviation: MEW
- Founded: 11 December 2022
- Ideology: Welsh nationalism Welsh republicanism Left-wing nationalism Participatory democracy Eco-socialism; Socialism
- Political position: Left-wing
- Slogan: Y Cymry yn rhydd – mi ddaw ein dydd! ('The Welsh, free – our day will come!')

Party flag
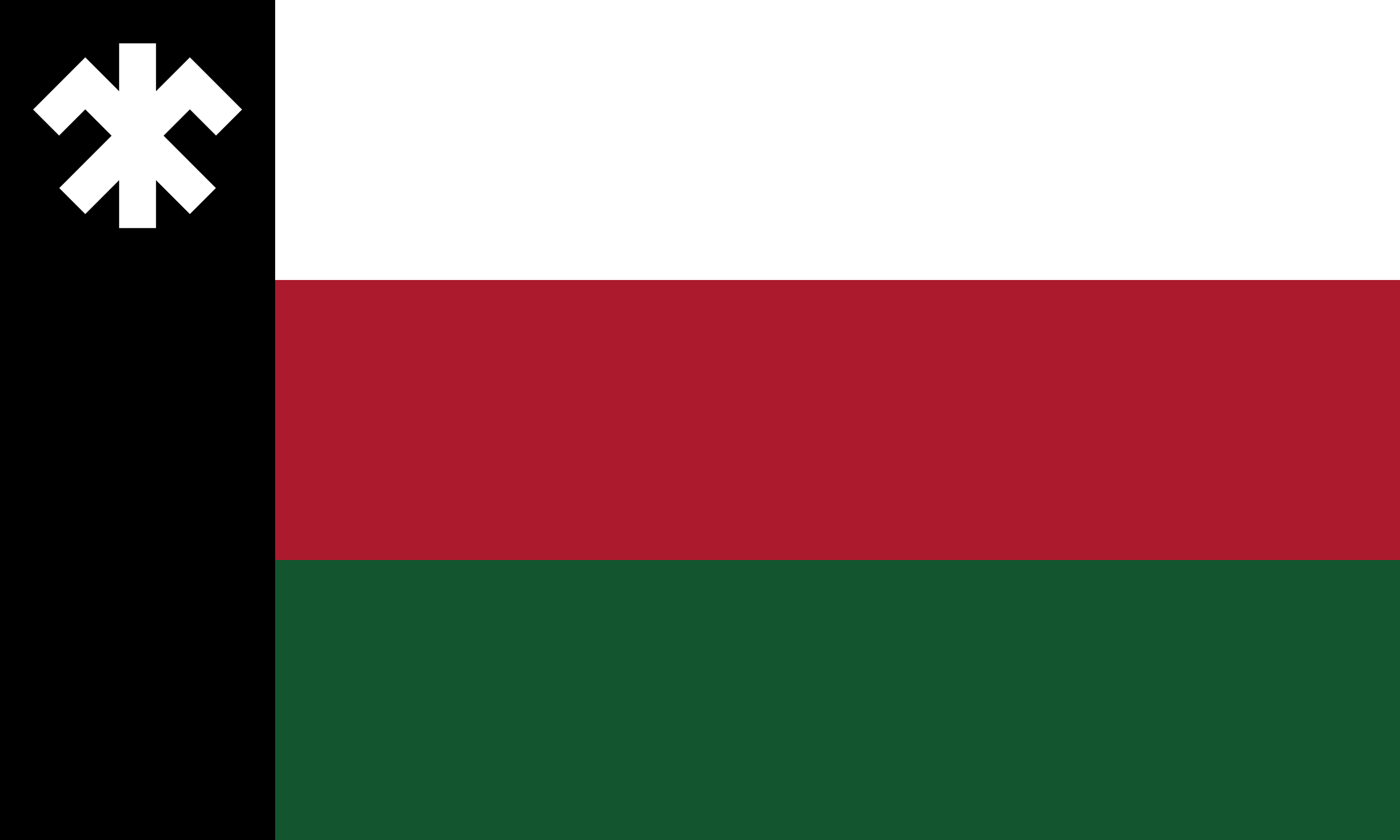

Website
- mudiaderyrwen.org

Mudiad Eryr Wen (MEW; Welsh: 'white eagle movement') is a Welsh socialist and republican nationalist youth movement. It is a direct action pressure group campaigning for an independent Welsh republic and protections for the Welsh language.

== Origins ==
Mudiad Eryr Wen was first established as an organisation on 11 December 2022, coinciding with the anniversary of the death of Llywelyn ap Gruffudd at the hands of English forces in 1282. The movement's symbol and name derive from the "White Eagle of Snowdonia", often referred to by its Welsh name Yr Eryr Wen (lit. 'the white eagle'), a symbol devised by the republican poet Harri Webb in 1952 and later most commonly associated with the paramilitary Free Wales Army (FWA) of the 1960s. Members of the organisation have often been photographed at various demonstrations and marches for Welsh independence carrying a flag resembling that of the National Patriotic Front, consisting of a horizontal republican tricolour with a vertical black bar on the hoist featuring the Eryr Wen symbol. The slogan Y Cymry yn rhydd – mi ddaw ein dydd! ('The Welsh, free – our day will come!') appears on the group's website.

== Activities ==
=== 2023 ===
Members of the organisation were reported to have attended a Cymdeithas yr Iaith Gymraeg (Welsh Language Society) anti-coronation rally against second homes in Caernarfon in early May 2023. Within months of its formation, the group gained attention across Welsh media outlets for engaging in a campaign of covering English place names with paint on road signs. Signs across Gwynedd and Anglesey were targeted, among them being the signs for Menai Bridge (Porthaethwy) and Welshpool (Y Trallwng). In March 2024, the group were reported to have targeted signs across Ceredigion, including Cardigan (Aberteifi) and Furnace (Ffwrnais), with a movement spokesperson commenting that "There is a proud and defiant current building within Wales to undo centuries of cultural destruction perpetuated by a distant and domineering ruling class in England, as the past year has made clear."

=== 2024 ===
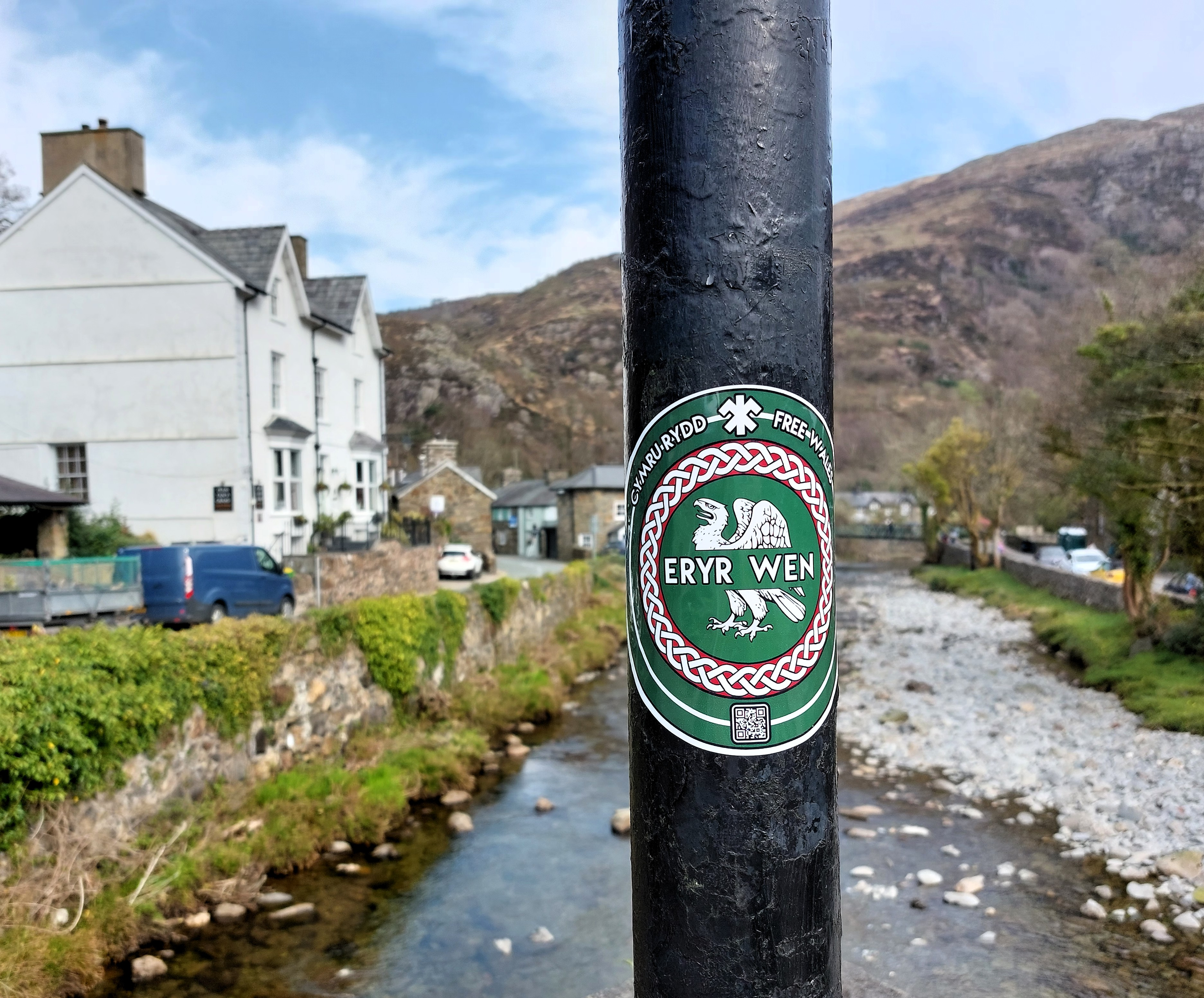
Bilingual Mudiad Eryr Wen sticker with the slogan "Cymru Rydd – Free Wales", photographed in Beddgelert on 13 April 2025.

In August 2024, the group was reported to have claimed responsibility for another wave of vandalism against English place names on road signs, this time targeting signs across Denbighshire, including Denbigh (Dinbych), Ruthin (Rhuthun) and St Asaph (Llanelwy). A spokesperson for the group described the action as "necessary and reasonable", citing the 2023 decisions by Snowdonia National Park and Brecon Beacons National Park to officially adopt their Welsh names, Eryri and Bannau Brycheiniog respectively. The historic abandonment of anglicised place names, such as Carnarvon (Caernarfon) and Dolgelley (Dolgellau) were also cited as justifications for the action. Conservative Member of the Senedd (MS) for the Vale of Clwyd, Gareth Davies, condemned the group for damaging public property, citing the Welsh Language Act 1993.

Later that month, an anonymous spokesperson for the organisation was interviewed by Welsh-language publication Golwg to discuss the movement's vandalism campaign. When questioned about the organisation's decision to remain anonymous and avoid arrest, in contrast to the approach traditionally taken by Cymdeithas yr Iaith activists, the spokesperson referred to criticisms of that strategy expressed by John Barnard Jenkins of Mudiad Amddiffyn Cymru (MAC). In September 2024, the organisation was filmed by S4C’s Newyddion attending a Nid yw Cymru ar Werth ('Wales is not for sale') demonstration in Machynlleth calling for a new Property Act.

=== 2025 ===
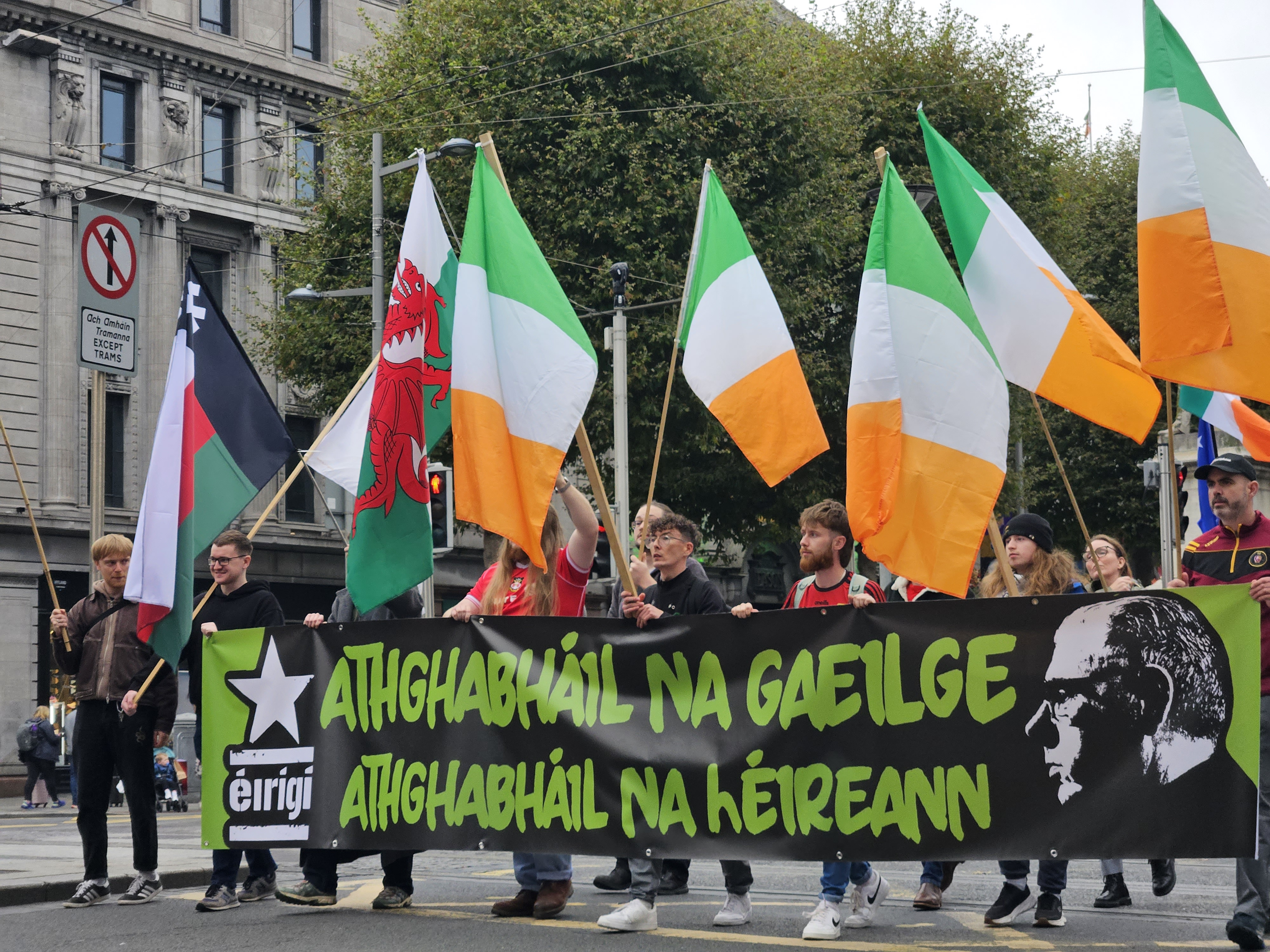
Mudiad Eryr Wen members march alongside Éirígí in Dublin during a march for Irish language protections, 20 September 2025.

On 25 February 2025, two activists of Mudiad Eryr Wen appeared on a podcast hosted by Irish republican political party Éirígí (Irish for 'arise') to discuss the history of Welsh republicanism. In May 2025, members of the organisation attended a Scottish nationalist march for independence in Glasgow. Scottish Conservative Member of the Scottish Parliament (MSP) Jamie Halcro Johnston criticised John Swinney and the Scottish National Party for attending the march, referring to the presence of MEW activists flying a flag bearing the ensign of the FWA. The Scottish Daily Express linked the group to an attempted bombing of a water pipeline connecting the Elan Valley Reservoirs to Birmingham in 1967. On 25 September of the same year, members of Mudiad Eryr Wen were invited by Éirígí to participate in a conference in Dublin to discuss issues relating to the Welsh language and socialism in the 21st century. Prior to the conference, MEW activists were pictured alongside Éirígí members and thousands of Irish-language campaigners in a march through Dublin to advocate for legislation concerning the Irish language and protections for Gaeltacht areas.

During the National Eisteddfod in Wrexham in early August 2025, members of the group erected a sign reading "Welsh not British" near the entrance to the event, in response to Net World Sports' decision to display Union Jacks and Reform UK flags on nearby property. A statement from the group to Nation.Cymru accused the company's Shrewsbury owner, Alex Lovén, of deliberately "taunting" Eisteddfod attendees, noting his status as a millionaire and links to the Conservative Party. The previous year, Lovén had been involved in a similar controversy after displaying "Woke free zone" flags at the same property without obtaining council permission. Later that month, the group protested against Llanpumsaint Community Council after it decided to discontinue simultaneous translation services at meetings, instead conducting them exclusively in English. Further controversy arose shortly afterward when the group issued a provocative response to a Daily Mail article, in which a spokesperson described the paper and its readership as "A swamp of illiterate bile". The Daily Mail article drew comparisons between anti-second home rhetoric in Wales and the Meibion Glyndŵr (Sons of Glyndŵr) arson campaign of the 1980s, suggesting that the rhetoric was motivated by anti-English sentiment.

In November 2025, a Cofiwch Dryweryn ('remember Tryweryn') mural originally painted by the pro-independence organisation YesCymru near Treorchy, was vandalised with paint. MEW activists were reported to have subsequently restored the mural to its original state. A month later, in December, members of the organisation were photographed attending the annual commemoration of Llywelyn ap Gruffudd in Cilmeri, carrying flags.

=== 2026 ===
In January 2026, the Tenby Observer reported that Welsh-language signage across the town of Tenby in Pembrokeshire had been vandalised with black paint, spurring condemnation from local councillors. Mudiad Eryr Wen publicly condemned the vandalism and attributed it to supporters of Reform UK, whom it described as "anti-Welsh scum", adding that the movement felt it was "compelled to act". In the following week, English-language place names on signs across Wales were again targeted, including numerous signs in Pembrokeshire, Carmarthenshire, Ceredigion, Gwynedd, and Flintshire. On 5 February, Andrew RT Davies, leader of the Welsh Conservatives, condemned the spate of vandalism, stating that "These attacks, presumably carried out by Welsh separatist activists, are disgraceful. The English language is central to Welsh culture. Attempts to erase it are completely unacceptable." The following day, Nation.Cymru reported that more signs had been targeted overnight, including signage for Chepstow (Cas-gwent) and Usk (Brynbuga) in Monmouthshire.

In June, North Wales Live and Wales Online reported that MEW activists in Wrexham had removed a Union Jack, an English flag and an Ulster loyalist flag that had been attached to lampposts near Wrexham A.F.C.'s Racecourse Ground. In a statement, a movement spokesperson said, "Many locals have been infuriated and have called for their removal; this isn't the Shankill and it isn't welcome here." The organisation additionally claimed responsibility for removing British flags near Ruabon the previous year. This occurred amid a dispute over the display of flags on lampposts in the town as part of Operation Raise the Colours. In response, Reform UK MS for Brycheiniog Tawe Nedd, Iain McIntosh, called on First Minister Rhun ap Iorwerth to condemn the act, stating: "Following recent reports of Union Flags being removed in Wales and calls to replace the name 'Wales', will the First Minister condemn such actions and confirm that the Welsh Government supports the continued use of Wales’ established national identity." The exchange came amid a GB News report linking the incident to a petition calling for Wales to be officially renamed by its Welsh-language name, Cymru.

== Ideology ==
In 2024, The Telegraph reported that Mudiad Eryr Wen had called for Wales to become a "democratic, socialist and radical ecological confederation". On its website, the organisation lists a ten-point programme detailing its ideological stances on a range of policy areas. According to a 2026 GB News report, the programme calls for the abolition of the monarchy and the title of "Prince of Wales", which it describes as "illegitimate"; compensation from England for the extraction of Welsh natural resources; the abolition of second homes; and for Wales to end its reliance on fossil fuels in favour of a "green economy in harmony with nature". Other points in the programme include a commitment to Welsh independence; the definition of Wales as comprising its geographical boundaries, people, culture and language; the restoration of Welsh as the majority-spoken language of Wales; empowering communities and introducing systems of participatory democracy; the reprioritisation of reducing economic inequality and improving living standards over economic growth; and the development of close relations with other Celtic nations, including support for their political autonomy. In a bilingual article published by Bylines Cymru and written by the organisation, it advocated for the decentralisation of Wales into cantrefi, broadly modelled on the Swiss cantonal system. The article further advocated for the introduction of participatory democracy along similar lines, to complement the existing Welsh Government in Cardiff.
