= Flag of Saint David =

- Use: Civil and state flag
- Design: Yellow cross on a black field (Sable a cross or)

Arms of the Diocese of St Davids; Sable, (a cross Or with five cinquefoils sable). The arms, lacking cinquefoils, forms the basis of the flag.

The flag of Saint David (Welsh: Baner Dewi Sant) represents the 6th-century Saint David (Welsh: Dewi Sant; c. 500 – c. 589), a Welsh bishop of Menevia and the patron saint of Wales.

Saint David's cross has been used as a flag to represent Wales, as a less frequently used alternative to the Red Dragon flag. England and Scotland primarily use patron saint flags of Saint George and Saint Andrew, respectively.

It is similarly used in the Diocese of St Davids arms. On Saint David's Day it often plays a central role in the celebrations.

== History ==
Proposals for Welsh representation on the Union flag have included designs which incorporate the Flag of Saint David

The history of the flag is somewhat obscure, but it seems to have emerged at the beginning of the 20th century. One theory is that it was developed to fly atop Anglican churches in Wales (possibly with colours reversed as a black cross on a yellow field) in the same way that the St George's Cross was flown outside churches in England, but since 1954 churches are more likely to fly a flag of the Church in Wales based on its armorial badge granted that year.

In any case, the colours of the flag, black and gold, have certainly long been associated with the Welsh saint, even if not always in the form of a symmetrical cross. St David's University College, Lampeter (now the Lampeter campus of the University of Wales Trinity Saint David), founded in 1822, adopted these colours as the 'college colours' in 1888, and the flag of St David continues to be associated with the college, and is often flown today in a form defaced to include the cinquefoils of the crest of St Davids College.

The 38th (Welsh) Infantry Division's Second World War shoulder badge, based on the flag of Saint David

A version of the flag was used as the shoulder badge of the 38th (Welsh) Infantry Division during the Second World War.

The flag of Saint David was mostly unknown, even in Wales, until the 1990s. While there was a large one along the roof in St Davids Cathedral with the cinquefoils, very few others were in use. However, there was also a wider feeling that the Union Flag did not contain any specifically Welsh elements.

In 1994, the Welsh Tartan Company (WTC) of Cardiff was researching other possible products, to complement its existing Brithwe Dewi Sant (St David's Tartan), which was mostly red and green. J. Wake, then of the WTC, decided to investigate if the St David's flag could be used more widely and commercially, within Wales. In response to a query, the Dean of St Davids said it believed that the cinquefoil and the cross were the property of the bishopric, and suggested that the WTC consult more senior officials. The WTC was then advised that the Prince of Wales probably owned the rights to the flag and might not give permission for wider use. However, lawyers subsequently advised the WTC that the basic flag design could be used commercially, as long as there was no cinquefoil on it.

To promote public recognition and use of the design, the WTC printed 1,000 St David's flags and distributed them around Wales; a PR campaign took place to increase knowledge of the flag. The flags were hung prominently in the Welsh shop in the centre of Cardiff and at other locations. Within 10 years, the St David's Flag was known and flown across Wales in patriotic use.

== Modern Usage ==
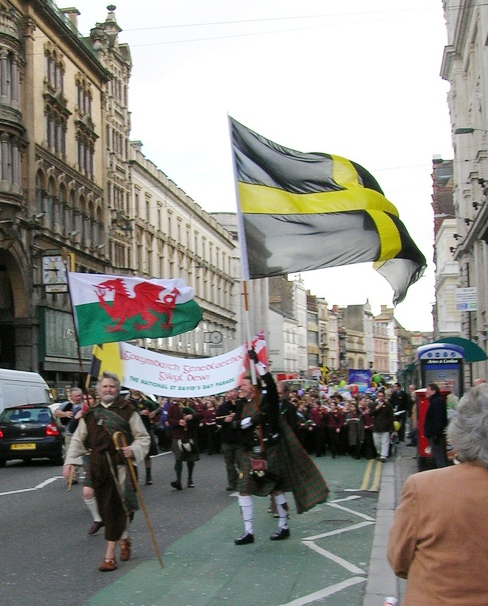
The flag of Saint David (right) alongside the flag of Wales (left) on Saint David's Day.

Between 2003 and 2008, Cardiff City F.C. incorporated the flag into their logo. The club also has eventually used the flag as captain armband. Crusaders RLFC, who started playing rugby league in Bridgend in 2006, also incorporated the flag on their logo.

In 2007 George Hargreaves, leader of the Welsh Christian Party, campaigned to replace the Flag of Wales with the St David's Cross, claiming that the red dragon on the Welsh flag was "nothing less than the sign of Satan".

In 2023 during the Men's Rugby World Cup which took place in France, the Wales team used an alternate black jersey with yellow garments.

=== HMS Flora ===
The crew of the Pembroke-built Royal Navy cruiser HMS Flora played football in a black and yellow kit, in honour of Saint David's colours. While docked in Chile in early 1903, they were beaten by a local team from Coquimbo, upon which the sailors gifted the local team some of their jerseys. Coquimbo Unido continues to play in black and yellow in the Chilean First Division.

== See also ==
- Saint David
- List of Welsh flags
- Cross of Neith
