= Flag of Wales =

Wales
- Use: National flag
- Proportion: 3:5
- Adopted: 1959 (current version)
- Design: The Welsh Dragon centred on a horizontal bi-colour of white and green

The flag of Wales (Welsh: Baner Cymru or Y Ddraig Goch, meaning 'the red dragon') consists of a red dragon passant on a green and white field. As with many heraldic charges, the exact representation of the dragon is not standardised in law.

The colours of green and white are the colours of the Tudor family; a standard featuring the red dragon was used by Henry VII at the Battle of Bosworth in 1485, after which it was carried in state to St Paul's Cathedral, and a dragon added as a supporter of the Tudor royal arms.

It was officially recognised as the Welsh national flag in 1959. Several cities include a dragon in their flag design, including Cardiff, the Welsh capital.

== Symbolism ==
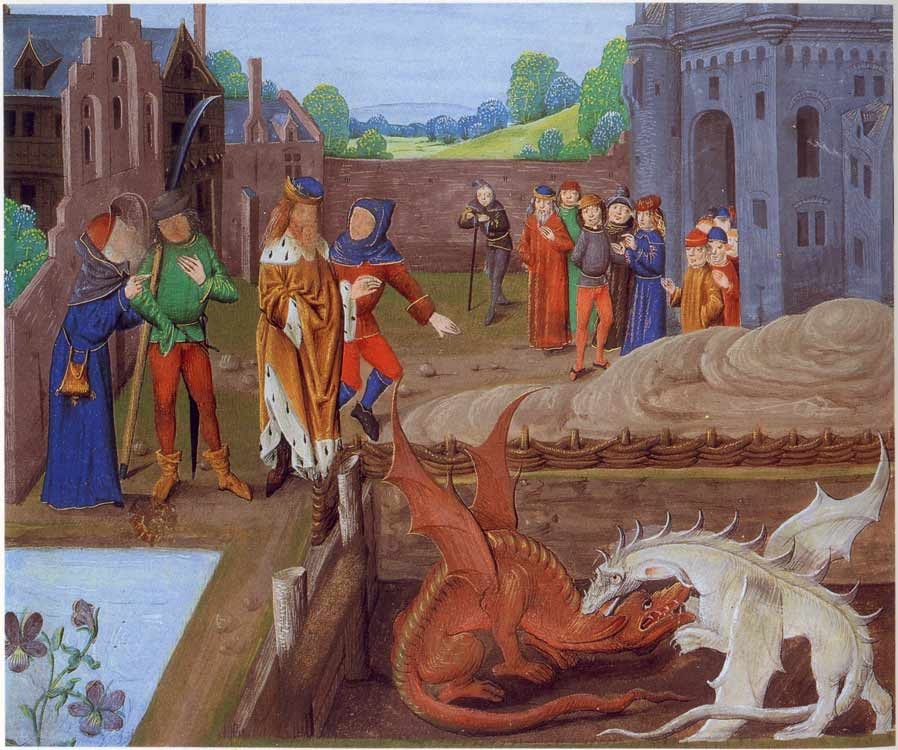
15th-century image illustrating the story of Vortigern and the red and white dragons.

In the Historia Brittonum, there is a narrative in which Vortigern (Welsh: Gwrtheyrn), King of the Celtic Britons from Powys is interrupted whilst attempting to build a fort at Dinas Emrys. He is told by Merlin/Ambrosius (Welsh: Myrddin) to dig up two dragons beneath the castle. He discovers a red dragon representing the Celtic Britons (now Welsh) and a white dragon representing the Anglo-Saxons (now English). Merlin/Ambrosius prophesies that the Celtic Britons will reclaim the island and push the Anglo-Saxons back to the sea.

The Historia Brittonum was written c. 828, and by this point, the dragon was associated with a coming deliverer from the Saxons and, for the first time, as a symbol of independence. It is also the first time that the colour of the dragon is verifiably given as red. There may well be an older attribution of red to the colour of the dragon in Y Gododdin. The story of Lludd a Llefelys in the Mabinogion wrote that the red dragon of the Celtic Britons was in opposition with the white dragon of the Saxons.

The dragon of Wales was used by numerous Welsh rulers as a propaganda tool; to portray their links to the Arthurian legend, the title given to such rulers is Y Mab Darogan (The prophesied Son). The Welsh term draig, 'dragon' was used to refer to Welsh leaders including Owain Gwynedd, Llywelyn ap Gruffudd (Llywelyn the Last) and "the dragon" Owain Glyndŵr. Cynddelw Brydydd Mawr, a court poet to Owain Gwynedd refers to him in one elegy, personifying him as "The golden dragon of Snowdonia of eagles".

Henry VII recognised the red dragon upon its blessing at Saint Paul's Cathedral following his victory at Bosworth Field under the realm of 'England and Wales' in 1485; the United Kingdom would not recognise the flag's official status again until 1959, despite the dragon being used by Romanised Celtic Britons since at least the fall of the Roman empire in the 6th century AD.

== History ==
=== Kingdom of Gwynedd ===
Banner of Llywelyn ap Gruffudd (Llywelyn the Last)

The Senior line of the House of Aberffraw descended from Prince Llywelyn the Great in patriline succession and became extinct on the death of Owain Lawgoch in 1378.

=== Owain Glyndŵr ===
Banner of Owain Glyndŵr

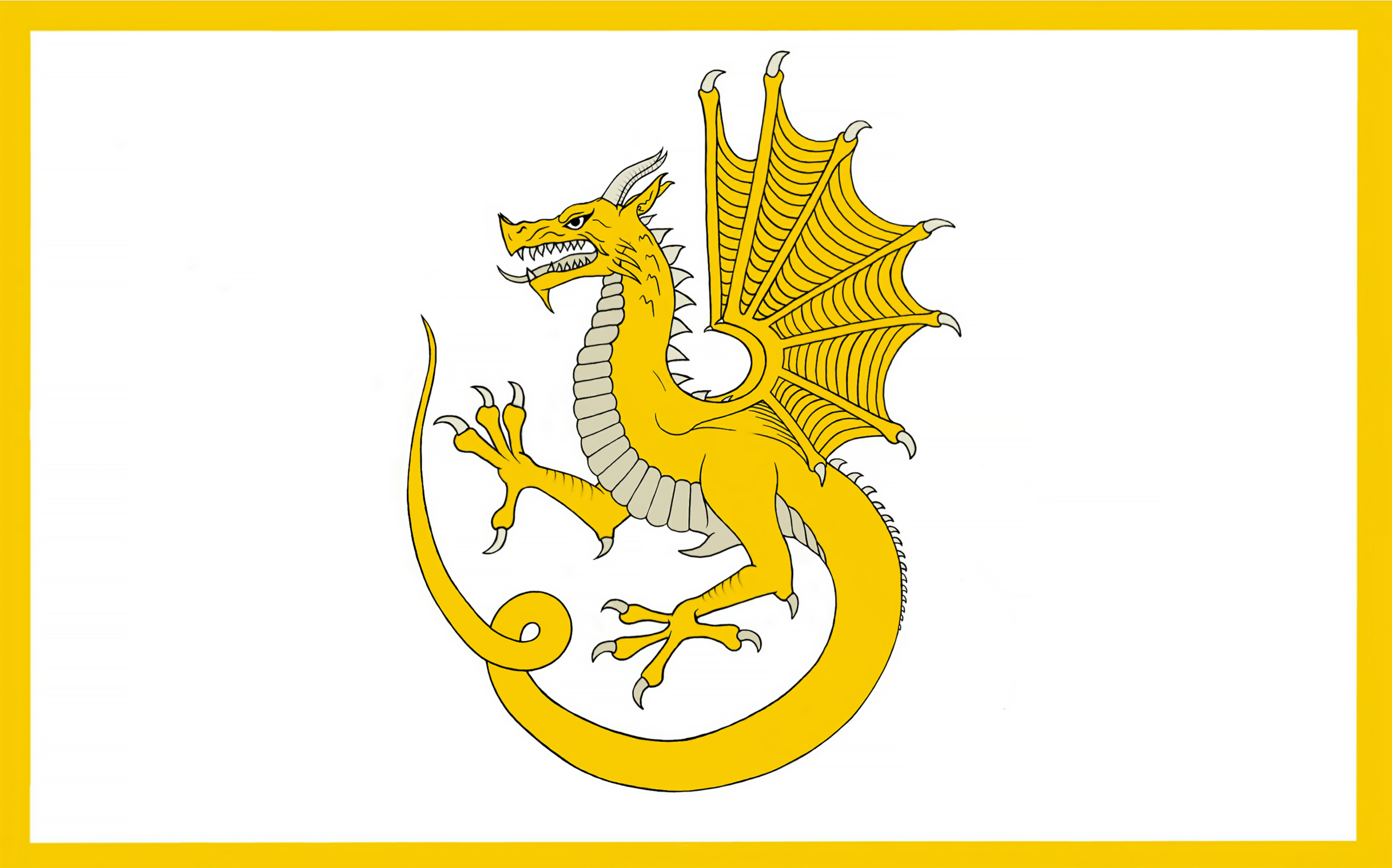
'Y Draig Aur' Owain Glyndŵr 'Golden Dragon'

In 1400, Owain Glyndŵr raised the dragon standard during his revolts against the occupation of Wales by the English crown. Owain's banner known as Y Ddraig Aur ('The Golden Dragon') was raised over Caernarfon during the Battle of Tuthill in 1401 against the English. Glyndŵr chose to fly the standard of a golden dragon on a white background, the traditional standard.

=== Henry VII ===
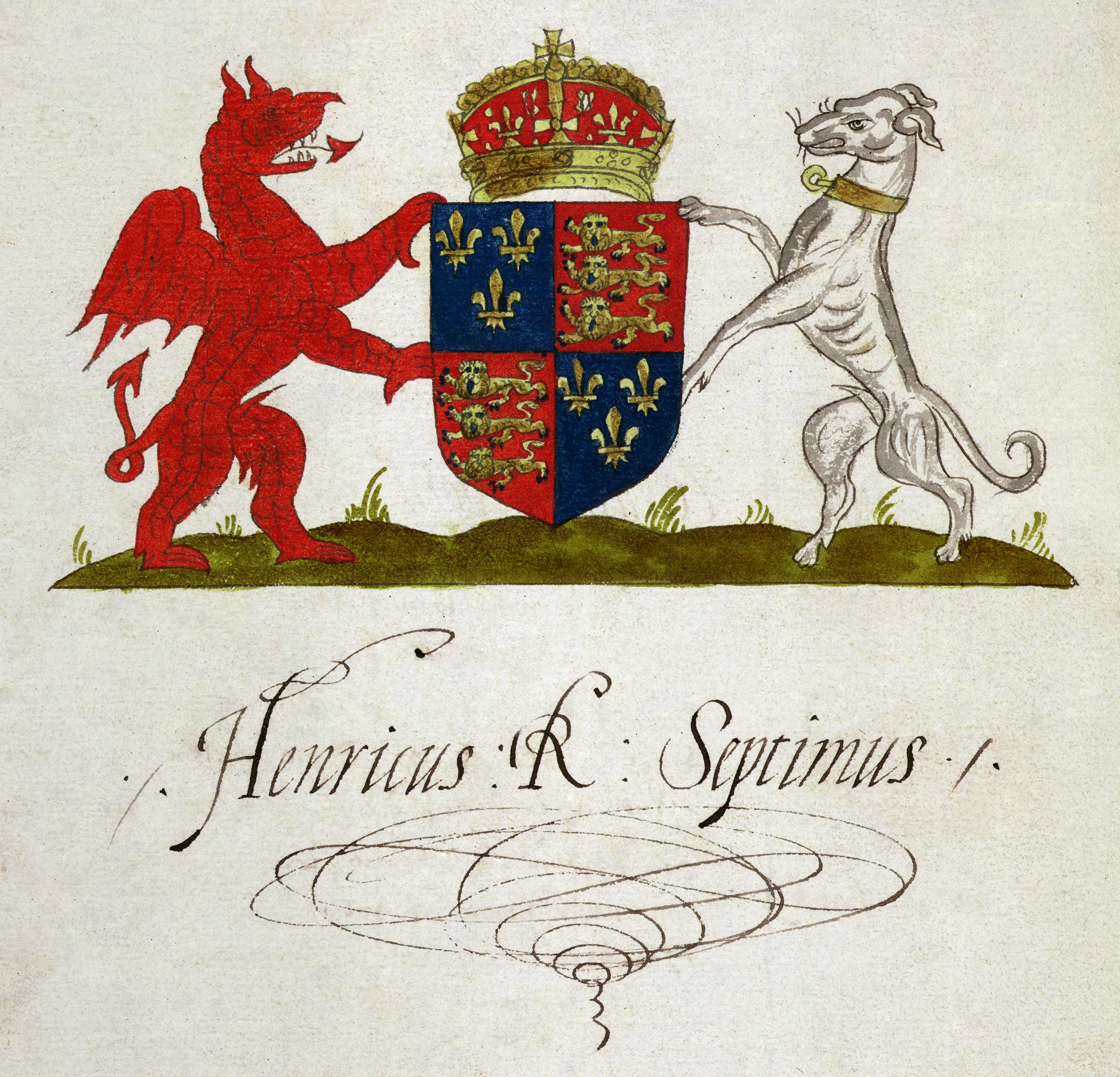
Coat of arms of Henry Tudor

In 1485, Henry Tudor flew the red dragon during his invasion of England. Henry was of Welsh descent and after leaving France with an army of 2,000, landed at Milford Haven on 7 August. He made capital of his Welsh ancestry by gathering support and gaining safe passage through Wales. Henry met and fought Richard III at the Battle of Bosworth Field, and took the English throne in victory. After the battle, Henry carried the red dragon standard in state to St Paul's Cathedral. The Tudor livery of green and white was added to the flag later.

=== Modern flag ===
In 1807, the red dragon on a green mount was adopted as the Royal Badge of Wales. On 11 March 1953, the motto Y Ddraig goch ddyry cychwyn ('The red dragon gives impetus' or 'The red dragon leads the way') was added, a line from the poem by Deio ab Ieuan Du. The badge was the basis of a flag of Wales in which it was placed on a horizontal white and green bicolour. However, the flag was the subject of derision, both because the tail pointed downwards in some iterations and because the motto was a potential double entendre, used in the original poem to allude to the penis of a copulating bull. In 1959, government use of this flag was dropped in favour of the current flag at the urging of the Gorsedd of Bards. Today the flag can be seen flying from the Senedd in Cardiff and from Welsh Government buildings, as well as UK Government buildings in Wales.

Between 1910 and 1916, Caernarfon town council continuously appealed to have the Welsh flag hoisted on top of Caernarfon castle's Eagle tower to replace that of the Union Jack. In April 1916, the mayor at the time, Charles A. Jones (who was also the deputy constable of the castle) said the reasoning behind rejecting the Welsh dragon was that "the authorities were advised that there was no such thing as a Welsh flag ... it was only a badge".

In 1932, the Welsh Nationalist Party see (who would later be rebranded as Plaid Cymru) appealed to the Office of Works to replace the Union flag with that of the Welsh flag on Caernarfon castle's Eagle tower on St David's Day. The office ignored them; as a consequence, on 1 March, a group of Welsh patriots climbed the towers and hauled the Union flag down from the Eagle tower and the eastern tower and replaced it with the Welsh flag. The castle's officials promptly took the Welsh flags down and restored the Union flags. Later in the afternoon, the Union flag was again hauled down from the Eagle tower and taken to the castle square where it was torn to pieces by some 30 or 40 students. The students passed through the turnstiles of the castle as ordinary visitors, climbed the stone steps to the Eagle Tower, and carried away the Union Jack, which had previously been removed during the morning. Several ex-servicemen looked on with evident displeasure at the treatment of the Union Flag and at one point it was likely that a conflict would ensue between the two sections.

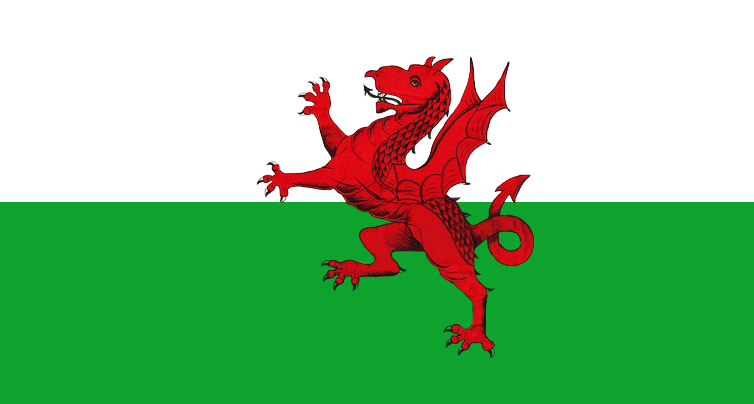
Variant flag of Wales used during the British Antarctic Expedition (1910–1913)

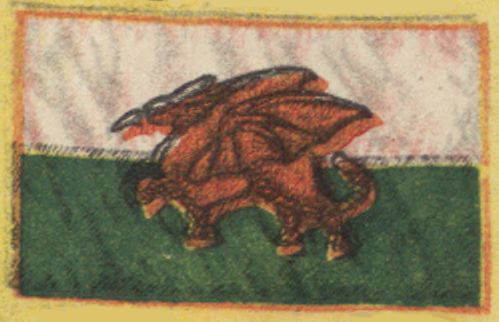
Flag of Wales from the 1919 Marshal Foch victory-harmony banner

Variant depicting the dragon on a green mount

Flag depicting the Royal Badge of Wales after its augmentation of honour, used 1953–1959

Flag of Rio Grande, Ohio

Welsh Australian flag

House flag of the Cory Brothers

House flag of John Byford and Son

One suggested redesign of the Union Jack with the red dragon from the flag of Wales added in the centre

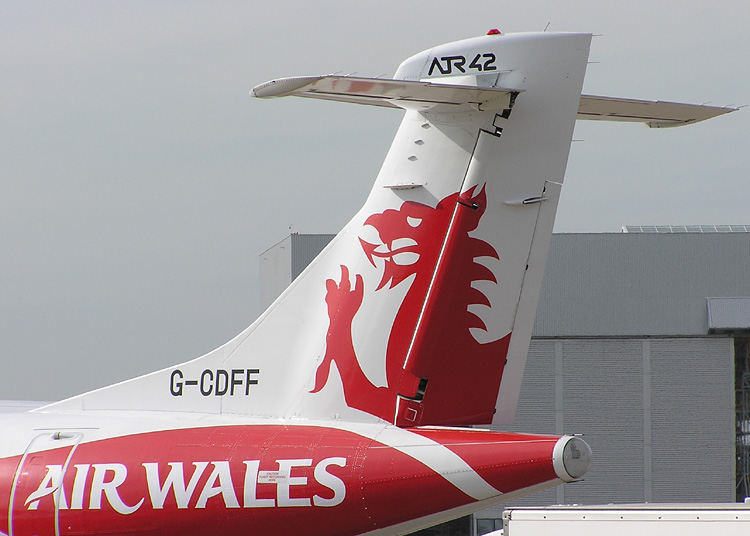
The red dragon on the tailfin of an Air Wales ATR 42 aircraft.

== Other flags ==
=== Flag of Saint David ===
Flag of Saint David

The flag of Saint David, a yellow cross on a black field, is used in the emblem of the Diocese of St Davids and is flown on St David's Day.

=== Government ensign ===
Welsh Government ensign

An ensign for use aboard ships used by the Welsh Government, such as the patrol boats of the Marine and Fisheries Division, was granted in 2017. The flag is a British Blue Ensign defaced with a yellow dragon with red claws and tongue.

== In popular culture ==
The flag of Wales has been used by those in the arts, sport and business to show a sense of patriotism or recognition with Wales. During the 1999 Rugby World Cup, which was hosted in Wales, the opening ceremony used the motif of the dragon several times; the flag was worn on a dress by Welsh singer Shirley Bassey.

Other musicians to have used the flag include Nicky Wire of Manic Street Preachers, who will often drape the Welsh flag over amps when playing live, and Cerys Matthews, who has worn the image on her clothes, while classical singer Katherine Jenkins has taken the flag on stage during live performances.

Former Pink Floyd bassist Roger Waters's album Radio K.A.O.S. (1987) follows the story of a young disabled Welsh man, grounded in California, who regularly expresses nostalgia and a hope for return to his home country. The chorus of "Sunset Strip" uses the imagery of the flag of Wales to further emphasise this:

And I sit in the canyon with my back to the sea
There's a blood-red dragon on a field of green
Calling me back, back to the Black Hills again.

In 2018, the flag made an unexpected appearance in Black Panther, during a scene set in the United Nations. The flag is displayed alongside those of independent sovereign nations, leading to speculation that Wales is an independent nation in the Marvel Cinematic Universe. The scene led to comments and discussions, including from the Welsh Government and Plaid Cymru.

In 2024, the flag appeared in Deadpool & Wolverine, where an alternative version of Deadpool, known as "Welshpool", was depicted wearing the flag as part of his costume.

== In Unicode ==
Flag of Wales in the Twemoji typeface, as it appears on X (formerly Twitter)

In 2017, the Unicode Consortium approved emoji support for the flag of Wales, alongside the flags of England and Scotland, in Unicode version 10.0 and Emoji version 5.0. This was following a proposal from Jeremy Burge of Emojipedia and Owen Williams of BBC Wales in March 2016. The flag is implemented using U+1F3F4 🏴 WAVING BLACK FLAG, followed by the emoji tag sequence gbwls, then U+E007F CANCEL TAG. Prior to this update, The Daily Telegraph reported that users had "been able to send emojis of the Union Flag, but not of the individual nations".

== See also ==
- List of flags of the United Kingdom
- List of Welsh flags
- National symbols of Wales
- Flags of Europe

== Bibliography ==
- Davies, John; Jenkins, Nigel (2008). The Welsh Academy Encyclopaedia of Wales. Cardiff: University of Wales Press. ISBN 978-0-7083-1953-6.
- Eriksen, Thomas; Jenkins, Richard (2007). Flag, nation and symbolism in Europe and America (1. publ. ed.). London: Routledge. p. 80. ISBN 9780415444040.
