= Marchwiel power station =

Study summarize

- Country: Wales
- Location: Marchwiel
- Coordinates: 53°01′55″N 02°55′25″W
- Status: Decommissioned
- Commission date: c.1950
- Decommission date: c.1960
- Owners: South Wales and Monmouthshire Trading Estates Company Limited (?–1950); British Electricity Authority (1950–1955); Central Electricity Authority (1955–1957); Central Electricity Generating Board (1958–1960)
- Operator: As owner

Thermal power station
- Primary fuel: Coal

Power generation
- Units operational: 1 x 7.5 MW, 1 x 4.65 MW
- Make and model: Parsons, British Thomson-Houston
- Nameplate capacity: 12.41 MW
- Annual net output: 28.8 GWh (1956)

Marchwiel power station was an electricity generating plant providing a central source of electric current for the Marchwiel Trading Estate near Wrexham. It was under state ownership and operation from 1950 to 1960.

== History ==
The Marchwiel Trading Estate, south east of Wrexham, was developed after the Second World War on the site of a Royal Ordnance Factory. Electricity for the estate was generated by a power station initially operated by the South Wales and Monmouthshire Trading Estates Company Limited. This company was established in 1936 to promote the development of a diverse range of industry in Wales and built several industrial estates.

The British Electricity Authority (BEA) purchased Marchwiel power station from the South Wales Company on 1 October 1950. The BEA developed the station with new plant, but it was divested by the Central Electricity Generating Board (CEGB) in 1960.

== Generating plant ==
The plant comprised:

4 × 50,000 lb/h (6.3 kg/s) John Thompson boilers with chain grate stokers. Steam conditions were 250 psi and 650°F (17.2 bar and 343°C), these supplied steam to:

1 × 7.5 MW Parsons turbo-alternator

1 × 4.65 MW British Thomson-Houston turbo-alternator, commissioned in May 1952

There was also a 260 kW oil engine, house services set.

Condenser cooling was by circulating cooling water plus three wooden Davenport cooling towers each rated at 0.255 million gallons per hour (1159 m^{3}/h), plus one reinforced concrete cooling tower rated at 0.3 million gallons per hour (1364 m^{3}/h); the concrete tower was commissioned in May 1952.

The operating data was as follows:

Year	Running hours	Output capacity MW	Electricity sent out MWh	Thermal efficiency per cent
1954	2731	11	24,365	15.25
1955	2705	11	25,176	14.42
1956	3628	11	28,796	14.69
1957	2989	11	18,793	14.07
1958	2656	11	144,875	12.74

== See also ==
- List of power stations in Wales
- Wrexham Industrial Estate
