= Alex Lovén =

British entrepreneur (born 1987)

Alex Lovén MBE
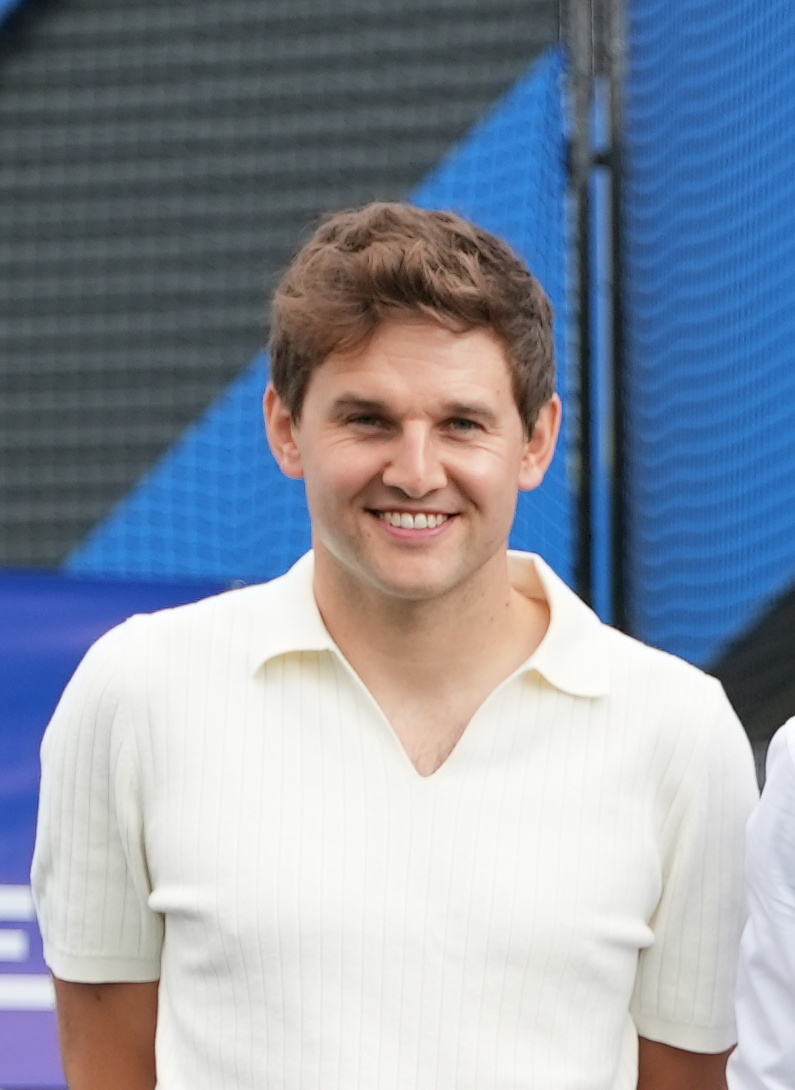
- Alex Lovén in 2023
- Born: Alexander Christian Per Lovén; 1987 (age 38–39); Shrewsbury, England
- Occupation: Entrepreneur
- Known for: Founder of Net World Sports
- Awards: Member of the Order of the British Empire (2023)

Alexander Christian Per Lovén (born 1987) is a British entrepreneur who is best known for founding the international sports equipment e-commerce business Net World Sports.

Born in Shrewsbury, England, Lovén first began selling cricket bats to his classmates. The business then expanded and operated out of his parents' home, with Lovén establishing Net World Sports in 2009, which moved to nearby Wrexham in 2014.

In 2023, Lovén was appointed a Member of the Order of the British Empire, and in 2025 was stated as the richest person in Wales under the age of 40, with an estimated net worth of £262 million.

== Early life and education ==
Alexander Christian Per Lovén was born in Shrewsbury, Shropshire, England, to his parents Per and Christine, and grew up in Oswestry. He attended Ellesmere College. While still at school, Lovén began selling cricket bats to classmates, after sourcing them online and buying directly from overseas manufacturers, with cricket bats bought from India. Lovén set up shop fronts on eBay, Amazon and then a website of his own.

In 2020, Lovén offered internships to pupils of his former school.

== Career ==
When he was 17, Lovén quit college and saved £13,000 from working at a local builder's merchants. He invested his savings into his business, which he set up and ran from his parents' home. The £13,000 was spent on a container of sports nets.

In 2009, at the age of 22, Lovén officially founded Net World Sports, as a limited company. With the help of his father who assisted with packaging and shipping orders; the business grew rapidly. The business moved to Wrexham Industrial Estate in 2014.

Net World Sports has received various business awards, including the Lloyds Bank Small to Medium Sized Business of the Year, and in 2024 the Department for Business & Trade Exporter of the Year. The company opened a new £25m, 411,000 sq ft headquarters in Wrexham in 2023, and employs more than 200 staff. For the year to 30 September 2023, the company turnover was £77.8m, with a pre-tax profit of £13.9m, up from £9.5m in the year prior.

== Recognition ==
In 2018, Lovén was listed in the Sunday Times Rich List as one of the UK's wealthiest young entrepreneurs. In 2025, he was included in the Times 40 Under 40 rich list as the richest person under 40 in Wales, with an estimated net worth of £262 million.

In 2023, Lovén was appointed a Member of the Order of the British Empire (MBE) in the King's New Year Honours for services to the economy, international trade, and to the community of Wrexham.

== Personal views ==
Lovén advocated for Brexit, also claiming the EU would collapse. He later stated support for a No-deal Brexit as the outcome of the Brexit negotiations in 2019.

Lovén's company Net World Sports has had his criticisms of others contained within its annual reports. Its 2021 report had Lovén criticise the low amount of tax multi-national companies pay (particularly Amazon), and stated that HSBC and Lloyds Bank had delayed a deal to purchase a warehouse site leading it to be sold to someone else. The company's 2022 report included Lovén criticisms of COVID-19 pandemic measures for their impact on the economy, mental health and him fending off "Men in Black Suits" which he also described as "mutant humans" and "apparatchiks", as they led to construction delays for the company's new HQ. Lovén supported measures for those most vulnerable, but he also described COVID-19 as a "total waste of time". He stated he has not had any vaccines, and criticised fortnightly booster shots, as well as stating net-zero policies would only lead to more people being "colder and poorer". However, he praised the banks he previously criticised and praised Wrexham itself, stating it was "on the up" and hoped his company can be a "force for good" for the place.

In November 2023, Lovén defended the display of a flag outside Net World Sports' Wrexham headquarters with the words "Woke Free Zone". The flag received criticism from some locals and reported by national media. Lovén stated he believed that "a cloak of wokeness" had taken over society, education, and the media, and created a "sense of entitlement" and "bone idleness". He questioned whether it was "aiding the development of young people", "the world is a tough place" and that "we should be building young people up, not pulling them down". Alongside that flag was a Union Jack and a company brand "Forza" flag. However, none of them had received planning permission by Wrexham council to be displayed at the time.
