= Jones' Village Bakery =

Welsh brand of baked goods

Village Bakery

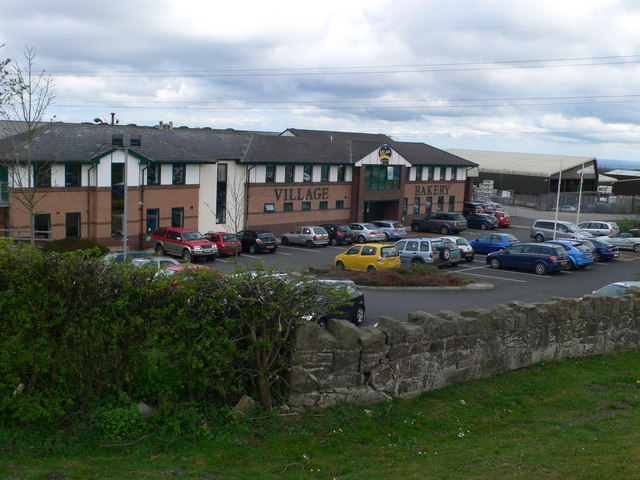
- The bakery's Minera site
- Product type: Baked goods
- Current owner: The Village Bakery
- Country: Wales
- Tagline: Born & Baked in Wales
- Website: villagebakery.co.uk

Jones' Village Bakery (or simply Village Bakery) is a Welsh brand of bread, pies and baked goods made in Wrexham, Wales and sold throughout Wales and the bordering regions of England. The bakery dates to 1934, with the brand established in 1964. The brand has three bakeries, one in Minera and two in Wrexham Industrial Estate.

== Description ==
The brand is operated by three separate companies, corresponding to its three bakeries, "The Village Bakery (Coedpoeth) Limited", "The Village Bakery (Wrexham) Limited" and "The Village Bakery (Nutrition) Limited" (for Gluten-free products). The brand was formerly branded and may still be referred to as the "Jones' Village Bakery".

The bakery sells bread and baked goods to various supermarkets and independent retailers in Wales. The brand can also be found in the neighbouring English counties of Cheshire, Shropshire and Merseyside. The supermarkets include Tesco, SPAR, Co-op, and Asda. The bakery employed 520 people in 2020. The brand is also exported to supermarkets in Iceland, and independent retailers in Malta and Cyprus.

The bakery formerly operated stores in Wrexham, Rhosllanerchrugog, Llangollen, Ruthin and Holywell. These were later sold to Nantwich chain Chatwins.

The brand has three bakeries, two in Wrexham Industrial Estate, and one in Minera. One of the two bakeries in Wrexham is its "nutrition" bakery, producing Gluten-free products. The bakery states it is the largest Gluten-free bakery in the UK.

== History ==
The original bakery was established in 1934 in Coedpoeth. The original small family bakery was bought by the Jones' family and established the Village Bakery in the same village in 1964.

On 7 July 2015, the bakery opened a baking academy in Wrexham, with the opening attended by Charles, Prince of Wales and Camilla, Duchess of Cornwall. The £3 million Baking Academy and Innovation Centre was the first of its kind in the UK.

In June 2018, the bakery announced their £12 million scheme to convert a former wire factory on the Wrexham Industrial Estate into a "state-of-the-art" production facility.

On 19 August 2019, their flagship factory on the Wrexham Industrial Estate was destroyed by a major fire. The alarm was raised at 8:41 am, and had no reported casualties.

On 18 August 2021, a new facility on the former bakery site in the industrial site opened. The 140,000-square-foot (13,000 m^{2}) facility would, in addition to a bakery, holds the company's headquarters, a baking academy and innovation centre.

In December 2021, the bakery launched a campaign to recruit 16-17 year olds in apprenticeships. Partnering with Coleg Cambria.

On 24 March 2022, the company signed a contract with American fast casual restaurant chain Five Guys to be the supplier of the chains buns and rolls using the chain's recipe.

In May 2022, it was announced a £16 million bakery production line would be installed at the bakery's Wrexham Industrial Estate site.

== Products ==
The brand makes various baked goods. These include: Pikelets (Crumpets), Scotch pancakes, Welsh cakes, Brown tin bread, Sub bread rolls, barm cakes, steak pies, sausage rolls, and a pasty bakes/slices.

== Awards ==
The company is the only one to have won the "Craft Bakery of the Year" three times. In 2013, it was crowned the fastest growing company in Wales, with the Fast Growth 50 award. In 2014, the company won "Bakery Manufacturer of the Year". In 2015, the bakery was awarded by The Co-operative Group as its "best community supplier" for 2015.
