= Line (heraldry) =

In heraldry: line of division of the field or vary a charge

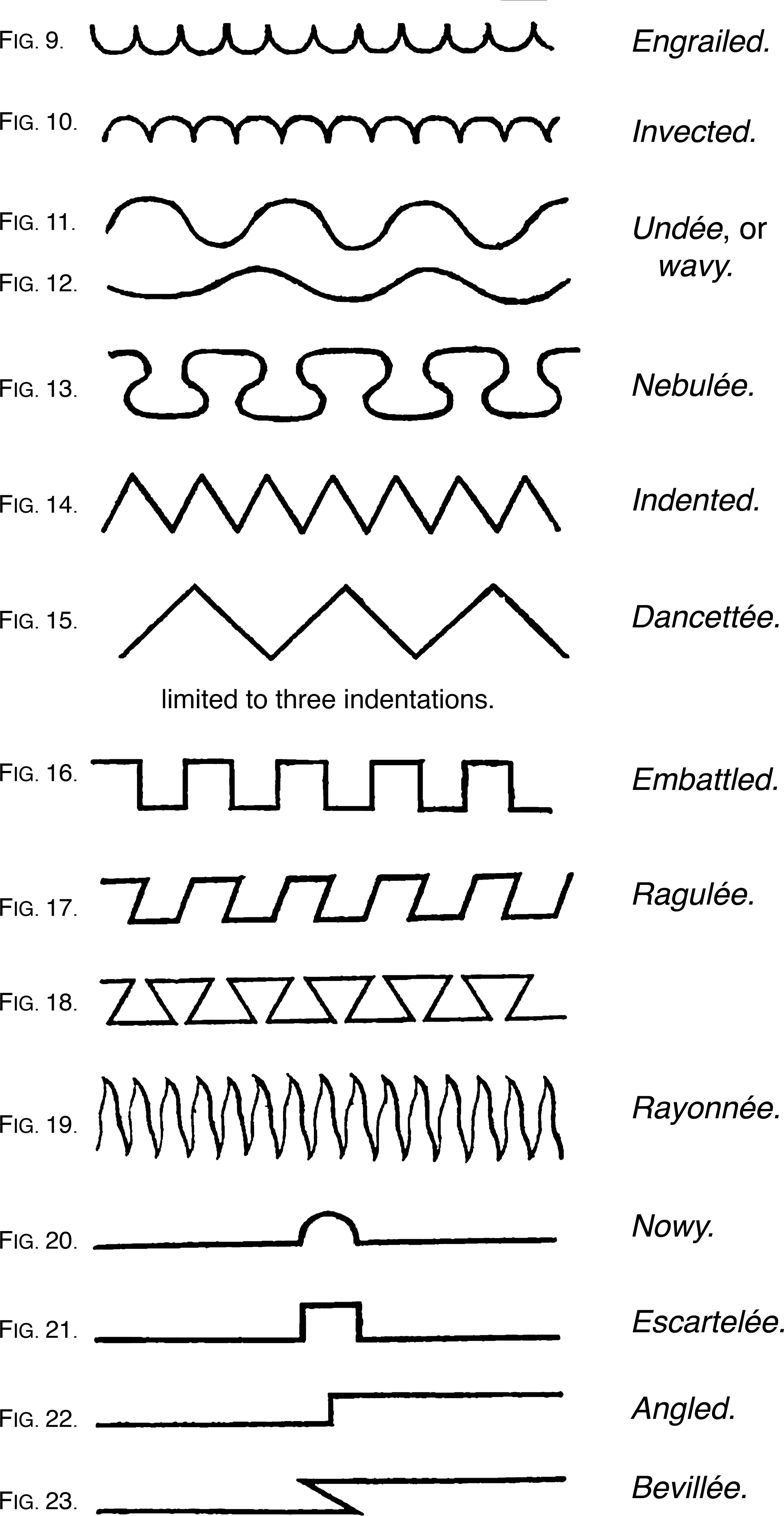
Overview. (Figure 18, lacking a label, is dovetailed.)

The lines in heraldry used to divide and vary fields and charges are by default straight, but may have many different shapes. Care must be taken to distinguish these types of lines from the use of lines as charges, and to distinguish these shapes from actual charges, such as "a mount [or triple mount] in base," or, particularly in German heraldry, different kinds of embattled from castle walls.

In Scotland, varied lines of partition are often used to modify a bordure (or sometimes another ordinary) to difference the arms of a cadet from the chief of the house.

== Different shapes of lines ==
=== Indented and dancetty ===
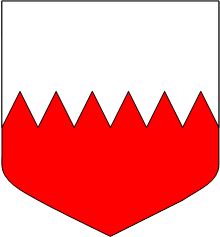
Per fess indented argent and gules

An ordinary indented is bounded by small zigzags like a triangle wave or the teeth of a saw, with peaks on one side matching peaks on the other. An ordinary dancetty is similar, but with peaks matching troughs, so that the width is constant; it also typically has fewer points than indented. In early armory these were not distinguished. In the arms of the 55th Electronic Combat Group of the United States Air Force the indented is "edged wider on the back angle (sinister) than on the face (dexter) of each angle".

Dentilly is a modern invention, similar to indented, but with one of the sides of the points perpendicular and the other angled, as in a sawtooth wave.

Rayonné (also rayonne, rayonny; from French rayonner) may be considered a variant of indented, but with wavy instead of straight lines, as in the conventional representation of rays of the sun. Rayonne palewise appears in the arms of the 172d Support Battalion of the United States Army. A chief enarched rayonné on a gold field appears in the arms of Sechelt, British Columbia, forming the appearance of a sun.

The arms of the Worshipful Company of Security Professionals contain an example of indented acute, a form of indented with higher peaks.

The number of peaks in indented is almost never specified, but an exception is the arms of Arthur D. Stairs: Per bend sinister indented of six steps Gules and Sable, and Westville, Natal, South Africa bears Sable, issuant from behind a fence of spears in base Argent, a fig tree in leaf Or; on a chief indented of four points to base, also Or, three lion's faces Sable.

In South Africa there are a number of examples of dancetty inverted. While the number of peaks in dancetty are three unless otherwise specified, the arms of Wagland show dancetty of two points and the arms of Baz Manning show a chief "dancetty of two full points upwards". The arms of the Matroosberg Transitional Representative Council in South Africa give an example of dancetty… in the shape of a letter W. The arms of the French department of Côtes d'Armor show émanché, which would be equivalent to the English per fess dancetty of two full points upwards. The arms of Baron Griffiths of Fforestfach are Paly of four Vert and Argent per fess enhanced indented of two points upwards each point double barbed throughout issuing in base a pile double barbed throughout all counterchanged. The arms of Alaric John Martin Woodrow show an example of barry dancetty each point double barbed, used to represent a line of fir trees as a play on the surname. The arms of the Free State in South Africa show "a chief dancetty, the peaks terminating in merlons", and so might be called a combination of dancetty and embattled; a similar hybrid can be seen in the arms of the Agricultural Gymnasium. Hoerskool Hangklip provide an example of dancetty with points flattened, and Blouberg of dancetty the peaks couped. It is difficult to know whether to characterise the "wall-like extremity with five merlons and four embrasures" in the arms of the Kurgan Oblast in Russia as a divided field or a charge.

The arms of Ernest John Altobello show a chevron with the upper edge grady (this is identical in appearance to indented) "and ensigned of a tower Argent".

=== Wavy and nebuly ===
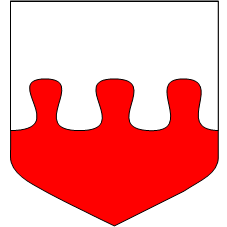
Per fess nebuly argent and gules

A line wavy (also called undy) is a sine wave, often used to represent water; a line nebuly is similar but with more exaggerated meanders, representing clouds. There are confusing, ambiguous and non-standard uses of a wavy in the military heraldry of the United States to refer to irregularly wavy lines.

The wavy chief in the arms of Lord Nelson was blazoned as undulated.

The field of the arms of the 40th Finance Battalion of the United States Army is blazoned per fess wavy (in the manner of a Taeguk).

In wavy crested the waves appear like pointed breakers. The arms of James Hill show an example of barrulets wavy crested to the sinister on the upper edge. The chief in the arms of Professor S.W. Haines is wavy of one crest and depressed in the centre of one point.

There are examples of even greater complexity and specificity in the wavy line, such as the arms of "Baron Nolan ... [which include] three 'bars wavy couped composed of two troughs and a wave invected of one point on the upper edge and engrailed of one point on the lower edge'".

Specification of the number of "undulations" in nebuly can be seen by Jochen Wilke's roundel, with ten. (It is uncommon for lines of partition to modify a charge other than an ordinary.)

The Blount family of Worcestershire, England, whose members held the titles of Baron Mountjoy and two baronetcies, bore Barry nebuly of six or and sable. Nebuly lines also appear in the arms of the former borough councils of Fleetwood (Lancashire) and Hyde (Cheshire).

=== Engrailed and invected ===
The ducs de Berry bore the French royal arms with a bordure engrailed gules for difference.

These lines consist of a series of circular arcs curving in the same direction, meeting at angles, forming points outward (engrailed) or inward (invected). When these terms are applied to a partition rather than to an ordinary, the first part of the field is the "interior".

The arms of Liverpool Hope University include a Cross engrailed of one point on each limb. The Flag of Flintshire is Argent a cross engrailed sable between four Cornish choughs proper.

The Flag of Flintshire includes a cross engrailed sable.

The arms of the Pretoria Philatelic Society show a chief engrailed and couped, having the appearance of the edge of a perforated postage stamp. The arms of Kutlwanong Dorp in South Africa provide an example both of the specification of the number of lobes in invected, and those lobes being trefly.

=== Embattled and variants ===
The Boyle family, whose titles include the Earl of Cork, bears the arms Per bend embattled argent and gules

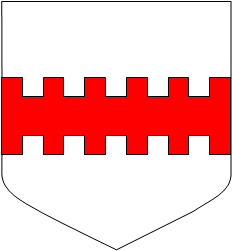
Argent, a fess bretessé gules

A line embattled is a square wave, representing the battlements of a castle.

When a fess is embattled, only the topmost edge is altered (as in the arms of Muri bei Bern). If both edges are to be embattled, the term embattled-counter-embattled (or counter-embattled, as in the arms of Sir Cecil Denniston Burney) is used. In this case the lines are parallel. If gaps face gaps, the term bretessé is used. There is at least one emblazonment suggesting that the orle is only embattled on its outer edge.

Italian armory has a variant, Ghibelline battlement, with notched merlons.

In a line raguly the extensions are oblique rather than orthogonal, like the stumps of limbs protruding from a tree-trunk.

Dovetailed is as in carpentry. Unlike embattled, gaps face gaps.

Potenty may be considered a variant in which the points are extended to T-shapes ("potent" means a crutch).

A line embattled grady or battled embattled consists of series of two or three steps, as if each merlon has a smaller merlon atop it. Parker's glossary says that double-embattled may be the same as this.

The arms of Schellenberg in Liechtenstein provide an example of embattled "with three battlements". The bordure in the arms of Boissy l'Aillerie, in Val d'Oise, France, has nine battlements (the bordure is also masoned and contains door-like openings).

A very unusual occurrence of embattled occurs in the arms of the 136th Military Police Battalion of the United States Army: Sable, a fesse enhanced and embattled Or, overall a magnifying glass palewise rim Argent (Silver Gray), the glass surmounting and enlarging the middle crenel between two merlons, the handle Gules edged of the second bearing a mullet Argent.

The arms of Baron Kirkwood show two chevronels round embattled (the merlons are rounded rather than squares). There are also examples of embattled pointed and embattled in the form of mine dumps.

James Parker cites the arms of Christopher Draisfield: "Gules, a chevron raguly of two bastons couped at the top argent."

The arms of Zodwa Special School for Severely Mentally Handicapped Children show a chevron dovetailed, the peak ensigned with a potent issuant.

Or, a chief urdy gules in the coat of arms of Pirkanmaa

Some examples also exist of urdy, where the line is in the shapes of the upside-down and rightside-up "shields" of vair (this is to be distinguished from couped urdy, in which the couping takes a pointed form). The arms of Winfried Paul Reinhold Steinhagen are Per chevron, the peak in the form of a merlon round urdy of four, Gules and Or, in chief a horse forcene and a goat clymant respecting one another, Argent, and in base a bull's head Sable armed Argent; a chief per fess in the form of a wall with three watchtowers, Azure and Argent, the latter charged with a strand of barbed wire throughout, Sable. The "unusual, if not unique" arms of Lourens Du Toit are Per fess of three pallets urdy Sable and Or.

The arms of the Royal Australasian College of Dental Surgeons have a bordure emblazoned "dentate", although this appears to be quite similar to dovetailed.

=== Embowed, nowy and variants ===
A line embowed consists of a single arch.

A line nowy contains a semicircular protuberance in the middle. A line with an angular protuberance in the middle, like a battlement, is called escartelly.

The arms of Laerskool Bosveld in South Africa have a field Per chevron embowed trefly, Azure and Argent.

The arms of Léopold-Henri Amyot show "per fess ogivy"; this is based on the ogive or pointed arch.

Chiefs, fesses and palar dividing lines are sometimes seen arched and double-arched (and there is an example of triple-arched), though there is some debate as to whether or not these are lines of partition. That arched can be combined with partition lines can be seen from the arms of South Lanarkshire in Scotland. Arched can also be reversed.

=== Rarer lines and recent inventions ===
Fir-tree topped line (kuusikoro) in Kainuu coat of arms.

The rare line bevilled modifies the bendlets in the arms of Thomas Roy Barnes and the pairle in the arms of Rovaniemi, Finland. This lightning-bolt type of line with one zigzag is to be distinguished from angled, in which the line takes a pair of 90° turns before continuing parallel to and in the same direction as the old line. There is a South African example of bevilled to sinister, and a bend double bevilled can be seen in the arms of Philip Kushlick School.

A line trefly shows protuberances in the form of trefoils.

The arms of Saint Paul's Cathedral in Regina, Saskatchewan contain a bordure its inner line looping in foils of poplar of the field within the bordure at each angle and at regular intervals between.

The arms of Carmichael show a fess "wreathy", which may or may not be strictly speaking a line of partition, but does modify the fess; the coat is not blazoned as a "wreath in fess". James Parker calls this "tortilly".

The 20th century saw some innovations in lines of partition. Erablé, a series of alternating upright and inverted maple leaves, is a typically Canadian line of partition, though the College of Arms in London has used it in a few grants (but compare the cross nowy erablé in the arms of Katherina Fahlman Selinger Schaaf. A Finnish line of partition, invented by Kaj Cajander and called kuusikoro, which is called fir-tree topped in Britain, and which the Canadian Heraldic Authority coined the term sapiné to blazon, resembles fir trees; in the arms of Guy Selvester this is called sapinage. A line resembling fir twigs, and so called in British blazon, is called sapinagé in Canada (English and French), and havukoro in Finland. Other 20th-century examples of lines, or things akin to lines, include the 1990 grant to Albersdorf-Prebuch in Austria, in which the upper line of the fess takes the form of fruit, the bottom of vine-leaves. (It is debatable what the distinction is between such lines, and examples such as the arms of Bierbaum am Auersbach, a town in Styria, in which three pears grow from a pall.)

The South African Bureau of Heraldry has developed the line of partition serpentine (which has also been called ondoyant), which is rather like wavy, but with only one "wave", one complete cycle of a sine wave; the serpentine in the arms of the Mtubatuba Primary School is defined as "dexter to chief and sinister to base". (Similar is the German im Schlangenschnitt (snake-wise).) It has also developed the uniquely South-African lines of division (which can also form the ends of a charge) nowy of a Cape Town gable (now called just nowy gabled), and nowy of an Indian cupola. Similarly, the fess line in the arms of the Council for Social and Associated Workers is nowy of a trimount inverted, the fess in the arms of Mossel Bay is nowy of two Karoo gable houses, the chief in the arms of the Lenasia South-East Management Committee is nowy of an Indian cupola, the chief in the arms of the Genealogical Society of South Africa is double nowy gably and that of Frederick Brownell is gably of three. The arms of the Reyneke Bond (i.e. Reyneke Family Association) are Per fess, in each flank double nowy fitchy to base, Azure and Or, a lion rampant per fess of the second and Gules, a chief Or. The plain chief identifies these as the arms of a family association. The arms of Itsokolele, South Africa include a chief double fitchy inverted.

Broad fitchy couped is a line of South-African origin similar in appearance to a mine-dump or escartelly with sloping sides.

Chevrons can be topped with a fleur-de-lys, and ordinaries with non-straight edges (particularly if they are dancetty or engrailed) can have the points topped with demi fleurs-de-lys. It has sometimes been said that in some reference works flory-counter-flory (and flory) is treated like a line of partition, even though strictly speaking it is not – though it has been used for centuries that way in the royal arms of Scotland blazoning the double tressure (Public Register of Arms, Lyon Court, Edinburgh) and used by the College of arms in blazoning coats like that of Sutherland of Dunstanburgh Castle (Gules, a chevron flory-counterflory between in chief three mullets and in base a lymphad all or) and is used by the South African Bureau of Heraldry blazoning the coat of Huis Tankotie of the University of Pretoria (Per fess, flory counter-flory, Argent and Azure, in base within the flower an annulet Sable; a bordure counterchanged) and Emmanuel-Opleidingsentrum in the South African Bureau of Heraldry's online database. (Flory is sometimes varied with other shapes than the fleur-de-lys, when it is blazoned as flory of.)

A vague and unhelpful blazon of the 27th Air Division of the United States Air Force provides for a "bordure of distinctive outline".

== Gallery of different lines of partition ==
Each shield is Per fess _______ argent and gules, but some of these lines have no common English name.

invected

engrailed

embattled

wavy or undy

nebuly

fir-tree topped, a recent Finnish innovation (also known as Sapiné in Canada)

fir-twigged, a recent Finnish innovation (also known as Sapinagé in Canada)

indented as it is commonly shown

dancetty, limited to three indentations

indented very much deeper than is usual

enarched

per chevron

trefly-counter-trefly

embattled in crosses, Finnish heraldry

potenty

palissado, Finnish heraldry

bastionné, Finnish heraldry

spaded

lilyous, Finnish heraldry

indented pommetty

rayonny

embattled grady

rayonny (variant)

dovetailed

bevilled

thorny, Finnish heraldry

raguly

nebuly

rayonné

urdy

angled

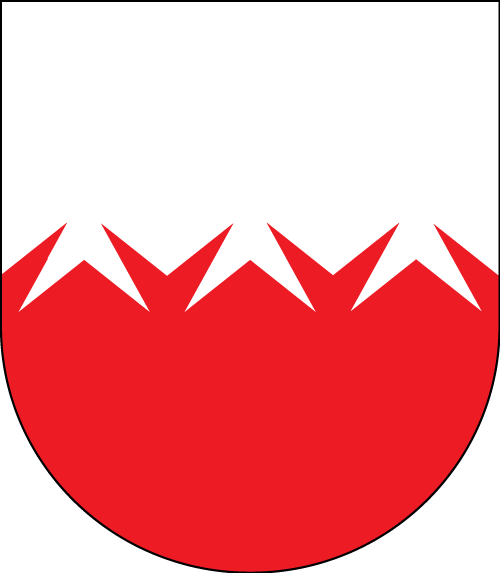
épiné (acacia thorned), also known as dovetailed indented

Érablé, Canadian heraldry

== See also ==
- Variations of ordinaries
