= Net World Sports =

Sports equipment company based in Wales

Net World Sports Limited
- Type: Private
- Industry: Sports equipment, retail
- Founded: 8 May 2009; 17 years ago
- Founder: Alex Lovén
- Headquarters: Wrexham, United Kingdom
- Key people: Alex Lovén MBE (CEO)
- Products: Sports equipment, fitness equipment, leisure products
- Brands: Forza, Metis, Harrier, CosySpa, Vermont
- Owner: Lovén family; (98% Alex Lovén and 2% Per & Christine Lovén) (as of 2018)
- Number of employees: 230+ (2023)
- Website: www.networldsports.co.uk

Net World Sports Limited is a sports and leisure equipment e-commerce company. Based on the Wrexham Industrial Estate, in Wrexham, Wales, it was founded in 2009 by Alex Lovén. The company designs and sells equipment for sports including football, cricket, rugby, and padel.

It operates under several brands, including Forza and Vermont.

== History ==
=== Early operations ===
Net World Sports was founded as a limited company on 8 May 2009 by Alex Lovén and initially operated from Lovén's family home in Shropshire, England. Lovén spent his £13,000 in savings on a container of sports nets, but by June 2009 the company's sales reached £85,000 for the month, and total sales exceeded £1 million in 2010. In November 2010, the business relocated from his family home to a 11,000-square-foot (1,000 m^{2}) site in Kinnerley, Shropshire.

In 2011, Lovén leased a warehouse for the company and employed their first staff member, and in 2013 the company began manufacturing football goals, under the Forza brand.

=== Move to Wrexham ===
The company reached £6.5 million in sales in 2014, with its first £1 million month being in December 2014. In November 2014, the business relocated to the Wrexham Industrial Estate, in Wales, which was five times larger than their previous site. The company launched a new website in 2015. Its Wrexham site was expanded further in 2016 after purchasing the site outright, and its office was extended again in 2017. The company rebranded in June 2017.

In 2021, construction began on a headquarters and warehouse complex approximately half a mile away on Bryn Lane, Wrexham Industrial Estate. The new 411,000-square-foot (38,200 m^{2}) headquarters was completed in 2023 and accommodates more than 200 staff. It includes various sporting facilities and replaces the company's pre-existing 130,000-square-foot (12,000 m^{2}) head office located elsewhere in the industrial estate.

In 2023, Lovén was appointed a Member of the Order of the British Empire (MBE) in the New Year Honours for services to the economy and community in Wrexham.

Following the completion of the new headquarters, Lovén announced his plans for a 1.5-million-square-foot (140,000 m^{2}) development of a business park, with the name "Utopia City". It is planned to include 18 mixed-use units, a petrol station, hotel, drive-throughs, and other facilities. It was hoped the application would be submitted in March 2023 and demand-based construction beginning in early 2024.

In 2023, the company extended its partnership with the Football Association of Wales to provide vouchers for grassroots football clubs in Wales to claim some of the company's Forza football equipment. The programme had helped over 400 grassroots teams, with almost £100,000 worth of £100 vouchers made available, although by November 2023 almost half (about £50,000) remained unredeemed.

In November 2023, Net World Sports raised a new flag outside its Wrexham headquarters. This was the 3rd flag to be erected outside the office, in addition to the Union Jack and branded "Forza" flags that were already in place. The new flag read "Woke Free Zone." It drew criticism from some locals and media coverage at a national level. The company's CEO Alex Lovén defended the message and displaying the flag, saying he believed that "a cloak of wokeness" had taken over society, education, and the media.

The company had not received planning permission for the flag. After a complaint, it submitted a retrospective planning application to Wrexham County Borough Council. A planning application for the flags stated flags would include additional slogans such as "Net World 3PL", "Utopia City" and one with the company's name.

In September 2024, the company partnered with the Welsh Sports Association to provide subsequent vouchers for equipment to sports clubs for an energy saving initiative.

In 2025, a new PVC football goal manufacturing hub was opened on an adjacent site.

== Brands and operations ==
In 2018, the company was 98% owned by Lovén, with the remaining owned by his parents.

Net World Sports operates under several brands, including main brand Forza and Vermont. Other brands of the company include Metis, Forb, Fortress, Rapidfire, Harrier, CosySpa, Aquatec, Vici, Pinpoint, Arvo, Forager, Atlas Fishing and Aceso. It provides over 10,000 products in 30 sports.

The company has partnered with various sports teams and clubs, particularly for its Forza-branded football equipment which has been utilised by Manchester United F.C., Manchester City F.C., West Ham United F.C. and Southampton F.C., as well as various other international football clubs. Partnerships have also been extended with Queens Park Rangers F.C., Larne F.C., and the local team Wrexham A.F.C. It also supplied its first official FIFA event, the 2021 FIFA Arab Cup. In other sports the company supplies rugby clubs, cricket clubs, England Handball, England Lacrosse, Baseball Ireland, Tennis Wales, and Sky Sports Golf. In 2019 it also partnered with the Canadian Premier League.

== Finances ==
According to company filings, Net World Sports reported a turnover of £61 million in 2021, representing a 27.53% increase from the previous year. In 2022, turnover rose to £64.5 million with pre-tax profits of £9.5 million.

For the year to 30 September 2023, the company reported a turnover of £77.8 million and a pre-tax profit of £13.9 million.

In 2016, the company was listed in the Sunday Times Fast Track 100 as one of the fastest-growing private companies in the UK, and as of 2021 the fastest growing in North Wales. The company's growth has been profiled by various media outlets. In 2025, the company's CEO Alex Lovén was also named as Wales' wealthiest person under 40 by the Sunday Times.

== Community and environmental initiatives ==
The company has been involved in the Wrexham Industrial Estate Living Landscape project, promoting biodiversity in the area.
