= Cross of Neith =

Former Welsh sacred relic

Wales Herald Badge depicting The Cross of Neith

The Cross of Neith (Welsh Y Groes Naidd or Y Groes Nawdd) was a sacred relic believed to be a fragment of the True Cross of Jesus Christ that had been kept at Aberconwy by the kings and princes of Gwynedd, members of the Aberffraw dynasty who established the Principality of Wales. They believed it afforded them and their people divine protection. It is not known when it had arrived in Gwynedd or how they had inherited it, but it is possible that it was brought back from Rome by King Hywel Dda following his pilgrimage in about 928. According to tradition it was handed down from prince to prince until the time of Llywelyn ap Gruffudd and his brother Dafydd. A representation of the cross came to be used as a Battle Flag.

Following the complete defeat of Gwynedd and the subjugation of the Principality, following the death of Llywelyn and the execution of Dafydd in 1283, this holy relic was ready for English expropriation alongside the other spiritual and temporal artefacts (see Llywelyn's coronet) of the Principality. The Alms Roll of 1283 records that a cleric named Huw ab Ithel presented this "part of the most holy wood of the True Cross" to Edward I of England at Aberconwy. It then accompanied the king as he finished his campaign in north Wales before being brought to London and paraded through the streets in May 1285 at the head of a procession that included the king, the queen, their children, magnates of the realm and fourteen bishops.

In 1352 the cross was given by King Edward III to the Dean and Chapter of St George's Chapel, Windsor, when, having founded the Order of the Garter, Edward established St George's Chapel as a major royal centre of devotion. There it remained until 1552, when it was confiscated, along with all the other relics and treasures in the Chapel, on the orders of King Edward VI and removed to the Tower of London to await "the King's further instruction".

What happened to the Cross of Neith after this is unknown. It has been speculated that it was destroyed, along with other relics, by Oliver Cromwell and fellow Puritans during the revolution of 1649, but other theories have also been put forward.

== See also ==
- Archaeology of Wales
- Wales in the Middle Ages
