= Flag of the Church in Wales =

The Flag of the Church in Wales

The flag used to represent the Church in Wales, known officially as the Flag of the Church in Wales consists of a blue cross on a white background with a gold celtic cross in the centre. It was adopted in 1954 by the Governing Body of the Church in Wales.

== History ==
The unofficial flag between 1920 and 1954

Prior to its disestablishment in 1920, the Anglican Church in Wales was a part of the Church of England. The flag used to represent the church was the Saint George's Cross, the same as the Church of England. Following the Welsh Church Act 1914, the Church in Wales was disestablished and separated from the Church of England. In the 1930s, the Church of England started to fly flags of England with the coat of arms of the respective diocese in the upper left of the flag. This practice became popular and was adopted by the Church in Wales unofficially using a flag of Saint David with the colours reversed in place of the Saint George's Cross.

In 1954 the Church in Wales' governing body passed a motion for an official flag to represent the church. Following negotiations with the College of Arms, it was decided that the new flag would consist of a blue cross with a white background with a gold celtic cross in the centre. The flag gained official status on 9 December 1954.

== Official heraldry ==
The official grant of arms defines the flag as "Argent, on a Cross Azure a Celtic Cross Or". There have been differences in the celtic cross in the flag with versions where the cross has the spaces within it filled with gold rather than showing the blue of the cross. As a flag for the Welsh made separate from England, the flag of the Church in Wales is viewed as a uniquely Welsh flag. Churches can use the flag, or the flag of their diocese.
