= Flag of Flintshire =

British county flag

Flintshire
- Proportion: 3:5
- Adopted: 24 February 2015
- Design: Argent a cross engrailed sable between four Cornish choughs proper
- Designed by: Historic

The Flintshire flag (Welsh: Baner Sir y Fflint) is the flag of the county of Flint. A campaign was launched in September 2012 to have the flag recognised by the Flag Institute, and it was formally adopted on 24 February 2015.

== Design ==
Arms of the Flintshire County Council

The flag is the banner of arms attributed to Edwin, ruler of the former kingdom of Tegeingl that covered much of the territory of Flintshire.

Those arms bore a black engrailed fleury cross (i.e. a cross capped with fleur-de-lis ends and scalloped edges) on a white field between four choughs, a bird once likely to have been widespread in the area, in black and red. These arms, in a slightly amended form, had been used by the former Flintshire County Council.

The council arms are differenced by the addition of discs on the arms of the cross and a voided diamond (mascle) at the centre. The flag simplifies the design but retains much of the basic symbolism and essential charges of the original arms in a way more suitable for use as a flag.

=== Colours ===
The colours of the flag of Flintshire are:

Scheme	Black	White	Red	Grey
Pantone (paper)	Black	Safe	485 C	422 C
HEX	#000000	#FFFFFF	#da291c	#9ea2a2
CMYK	0, 0, 0, 100	0, 0, 0, 0	0, 81, 87, 15	2, 0, 0, 36
RGB	0, 0, 0	255, 255, 255	217, 41, 28	160, 163, 163

== History ==
The arms which the flag was based on is attributed to the local 11th century ruler, Edwin of Tegeingl. The bird on the arms used to live on the coast of what is now Flintshire. M.P. Siddons, in his work The Development of Welsh Heraldry, Vol. II (1993) stated that the arms first appeared on the arms of one ‘Le Grand Ithel’ in 1389, a soldier and likely descendant of Edwin.

One of the earliest known appearances of the arms following this is in a window at Llanrhos church, Caernarfonshire, probably erected by, or commemorating Richard ap Hywel of Mostyn (c.1468-1540) who fought for Henry Tudor, though the Mostyns did not claim Edwin Tegeingl as an ancestor. They used it more broadly to show their heritage as coming from Flintshire, which is a practice that spread to it being heavily associated with the county. Flintshire county council were awarded the arms as official in 1938.

=== Modern use ===
In 2012, following the adoption of flags by the nearby counties of Caernarfonshire, Anglesey and Meirionnydd, the campaign for Flintshire to have an official flag was built. A proposal was made via a facebook page to make the arms the official flag. Various local groups, historical societies and representatives supported the campaign. Following its success, it was registered by the Flag Institute in 2015.

=== Reception ===
Soon after the flag's introduction in 2015, shoppers in Mold surveyed by The Leader newspaper gave the flag a mixed reception. Some were happy with the design, while others described it as "drab". Mark Tami, MP for Alyn and Deeside complimented the flag's "strong design".
