= Wrexham Industrial Estate =

Industrial area near Wrexham, Wales

Wrexham Industrial Estate Ystâd Ddiwydiannol Wrecsam (Welsh)
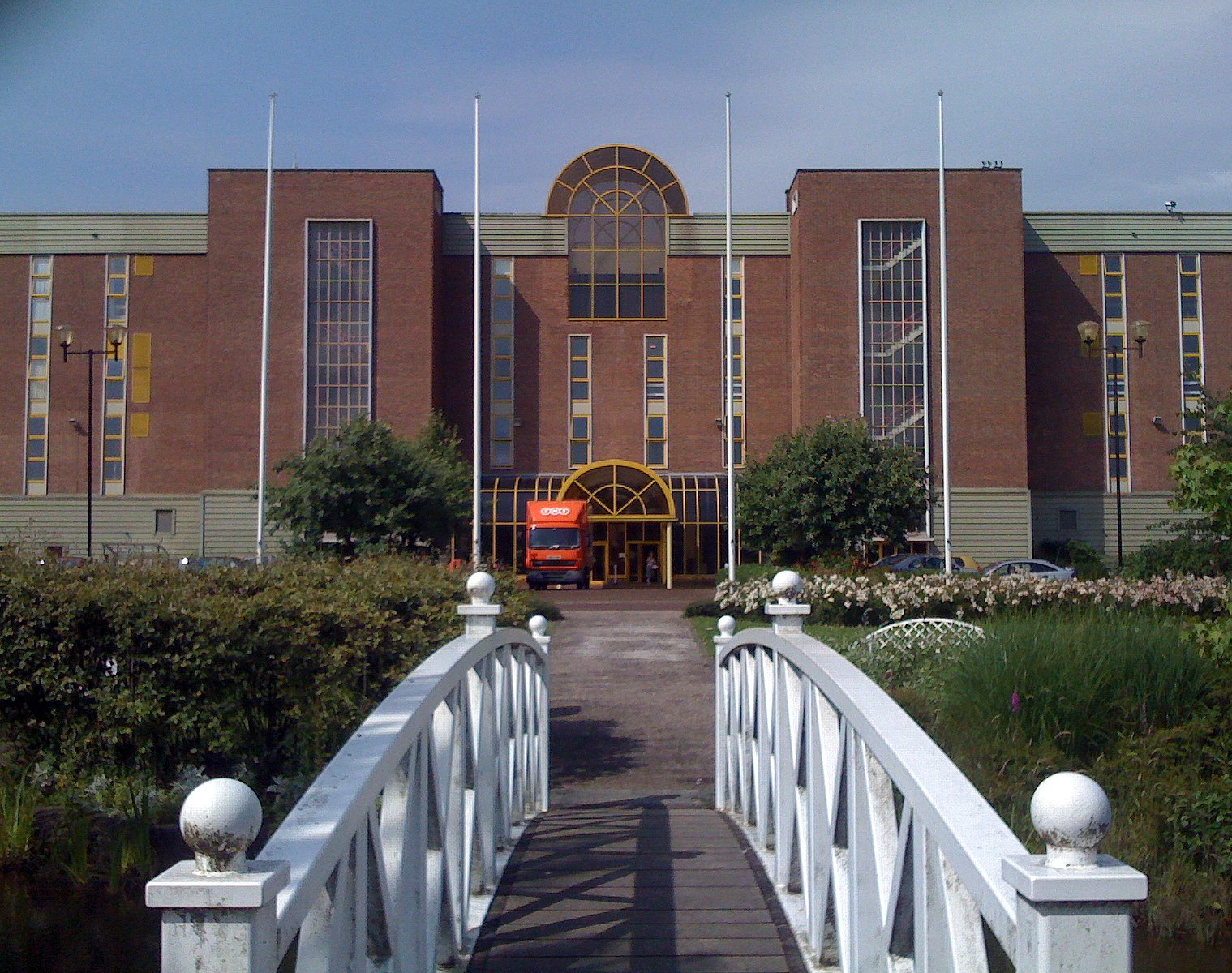
- Redwither Tower, largest office building on the estate

- Location within Wrexham
- Location: Wrexham, Wales
- Coordinates: 53.039°N 2.927°W
- No. of tenants: 300
- No. of workers: 10,000
- Size: 550 hectares
- Website: wrexham-industrial.com www.wrexhamindustrialestate.co.uk (old)

Wrexham Industrial Estate (Welsh: Ystâd Ddiwydiannol Wrecsam) is an industrial area in Wrexham, Wales. It is situated 3 miles east of the city centre.

Originally the site of a World War II munitions factory, the estate later became known as the Wrexham Trading Estate. It has now grown to cover approximately 550 hectares (1,359 acres) and is the largest industrial estate in Wales, second in the UK after Trafford Park, and one of the largest industrial estates in Europe. There are around 300 businesses, providing employment for approximately 10,000 people. The estate consists of standalone industrial sites, industrial estates and business parks and is the location of the UK's largest prison, HM Prison Berwyn, which opened in 2017.

== ROF Wrexham ==
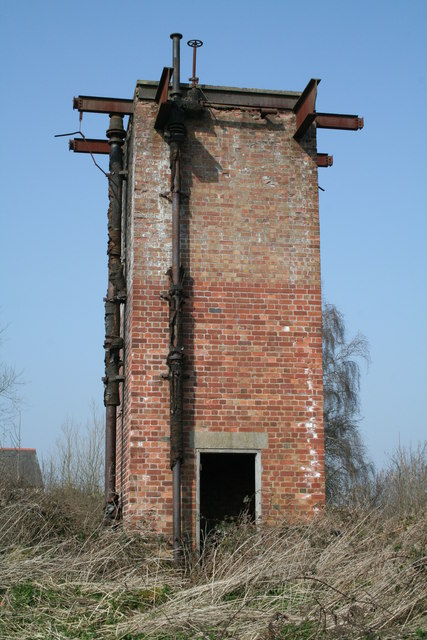
Remains of ROF Wrexham

The Wrexham Industrial Estate had its origins as a Royal Ordnance Factory, ROF Wrexham, during World War II. The site employed 13,000 workers. The factory made cordite, an explosive propellant for shells. The site was chosen for its distance from German bomber bases in Europe while having good rail networks and a rural location that provided a good supply of labour. The complex was spread over a large area to minimise any damage from aerial attack. The main buildings were camouflaged and existing farm buildings were left in situ to help protect the site against reconnaissance. Many of the original buildings can still be seen today and still house smaller businesses on the estate; these can be distinguished from the 1950s buildings by large grids near the roof, essential for ventilation of the buildings.

The Ministry of Works built a large water abstraction and treatment plant at Sesswick on the River Dee, just to supply the plant, which was amalgamated into the Wrexham Water Company (now Hafren Dyfrdwy) in 1951.

To connect the site to the national rail network, a large marshalling yard of 10 separate roads was constructed, and these connected to the works' internal network of rail lines. A passenger platform was built for military usage. All the cordite produced at the plant was taken by these sidings, along the Wrexham and Ellesmere Railway and then to Crewe. For shunting works, locomotives with diesel engines were used instead of steam as they were less likely to ignite any stray cordite, however it is known the works had possession of an 1859 0-4-0ST known as Victory.

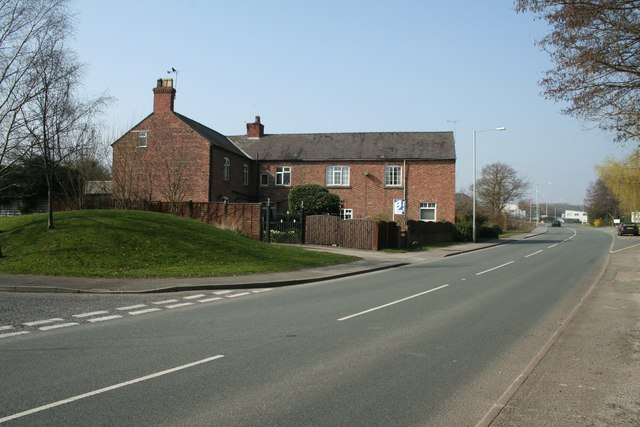
The former Coed y Bint (Coed Abint) Farm is in the centre of the estate, having survived in situ during the operation of the ROF.

The site was well defended, both on the ground and from the air; several Type 22 Pillboxes and Type 24 Pillboxes still remain in the area, found in areas untouched by modern industrial developments, and the entire site was under a mile away from RAF Wrexham, which was home to at least one fighter squadron, for defending the region's industrial assets from bomber attack.

After the war, the need for cordite ceased, and in 1945 the production facilities at Wrexham closed. Many of the buildings were left in place, abandoned, and agriculture again took over the fields surrounding the area.

== Post-war period ==
The large amounts of abandoned ordnance buildings attracted smaller businesses, however; in the 1950s, British Celanese opened a large acetate yarn factory on the site. Other large companies that came to Wrexham in later years were Firestone (closed in the 1970s), Kellogg's, JCB, Owens Corning, (closed in 2002), and BICC Cables.

The Welsh Development Agency officially made the area an industrial estate, subsidising businesses to move there in an effort to ensure stability of employment and to counter the effects of the recession Wrexham suffered in the 1960s and 1970s.

By 1990, the British Celanese factory had been sold to Courtaulds, who remained here until the sale of the last remaining building, Redwither Tower, to Wrexham Council, who re-opened the building and the surrounding area as Redwither Business Park with several commercial offices in Redwither Tower itself.

== Present times ==
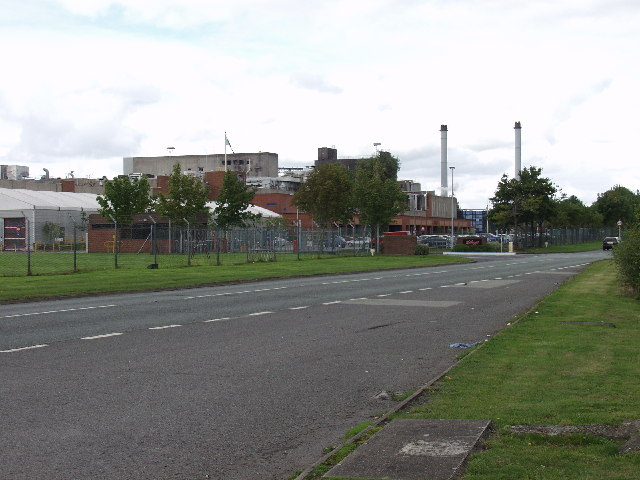
The Kelloggs factory is the largest single factory on the Estate

The current estate covers some 550 hectares (1,359 acres) of land, with more than 7000 employees in over 300 businesses including Kellogg's, JCB, Wockhardt, Cytec Engineered Materials, Hoya Lens, Ball Packaging Europe, JPDS Creative, the Depository Trust & Clearing Corporation, Calypso Soft Drinks, and notable additions such as Net World Sports, Demon Tweeks, Ipsen Biopharm, and The Very Group.

=== Companies ===
- Kellogg's - Produces the more 'health-oriented' of their range of cereals - All-Bran, Bran Flakes, Special K, Optiva. The rest of Kellogg's produce in the UK is made on Trafford Park.
- Jones' Village Bakery - has Three bakeries in the estate.
- Net World Sports - A leading UK sports equipment supplier headquartered on the estate.
- Demon Tweeks - Specialist motorsport and performance car parts supplier.
- Ipsen Biopharm - Pharmaceutical manufacturing and development.
- The Very Group - Major online retailer with distribution facilities on the estate.

=== Redwither Tower ===
Redwither Tower is the largest office building on the estate and forms the centerpiece of Redwither Business Park. Originally built in the mid-1950s by British Celanese as part of their acetate yarn manufacturing complex, it was later acquired by Courtaulds before being sold to Wrexham County Borough Council. The building has been refurbished and now offers furnished office spaces ranging from approximately 2,500 sq ft up to 25,000 sq ft. Facilities include onsite café, front-of-house reception, goods lift, parking, broadband, and flexible lease terms. Redwither Tower accommodates a wide range of businesses and serves as a commercial hub within the industrial estate.

=== Access roads ===
While the separate location of the Estate allows the actual city of Wrexham to be relatively free of large industrial developments, it has also created access problems. The need for an improved access road was identified 40 years ago and preparatory work eventually started in late 2010 on two new access roads, one to the north and one to the south. The £30 million access road opened on 16 July 2012.

=== Prison ===
In September 2013 it was announced by the Ministry of Justice that a new 2000 inmate prison would be built on the former Firestone site by 2017. In January 2014, Wrexham County Borough Council granted the planning application. Preparatory works began on the site in September 2014, with the prison planned for completion in 2017. As of July 2019 the prison is fully operational with a capacity for 2106 prisoners, making it the largest prison in the UK by far.

=== Projects ===
Wrexham Industrial Estate Living Landscape - Since 2014 the North Wales Wildlife Trust have worked with businesses, landowners and local communities to bring nature conservation and economic activity together to create a greener, wildlife rich estate for all to enjoy. As well as increasing opportunities for wildlife, the other twin aim is to improve the health and well-being of workers and the public by creating better access and holding events. One of the most widely observed undertakings is to create colourful, native wildflower verges and roundabouts. A number of rare species live on the estate including the grizzled skipper, great crested newt, bee orchid and Pseudorchestes pratensis; a weevil only known from two sites in Wales. The project has received direct buy-in from businesses and funding from the Welsh Government's Sustainable Management Scheme.
