= Marine and Fisheries Division (Wales) =

Department of Welsh Government

- Welsh: Is-adran Môr a Physgodfeydd

Agency overview
- Preceding agencies: South Wales Sea Fisheries Committee; North Western and North Wales Sea Fisheries Committee
- Jurisdiction: Wales
- Minister responsible: Lesley Griffiths, Minister for Rural Affairs, North Wales and Trefnydd
- Website: gov.wales/marine-fisheries

The Marine and Fisheries Division (Welsh: Is-adran Môr a Physgodfeydd) is a division of the Welsh Government whose purpose is to protect and regulate the fishing industry in the seas around Wales.

Its equivalent organisations elsewhere in the United Kingdom are the Marine Management Organisation in England, and the Marine Directorate in Scotland.

== Fleet ==
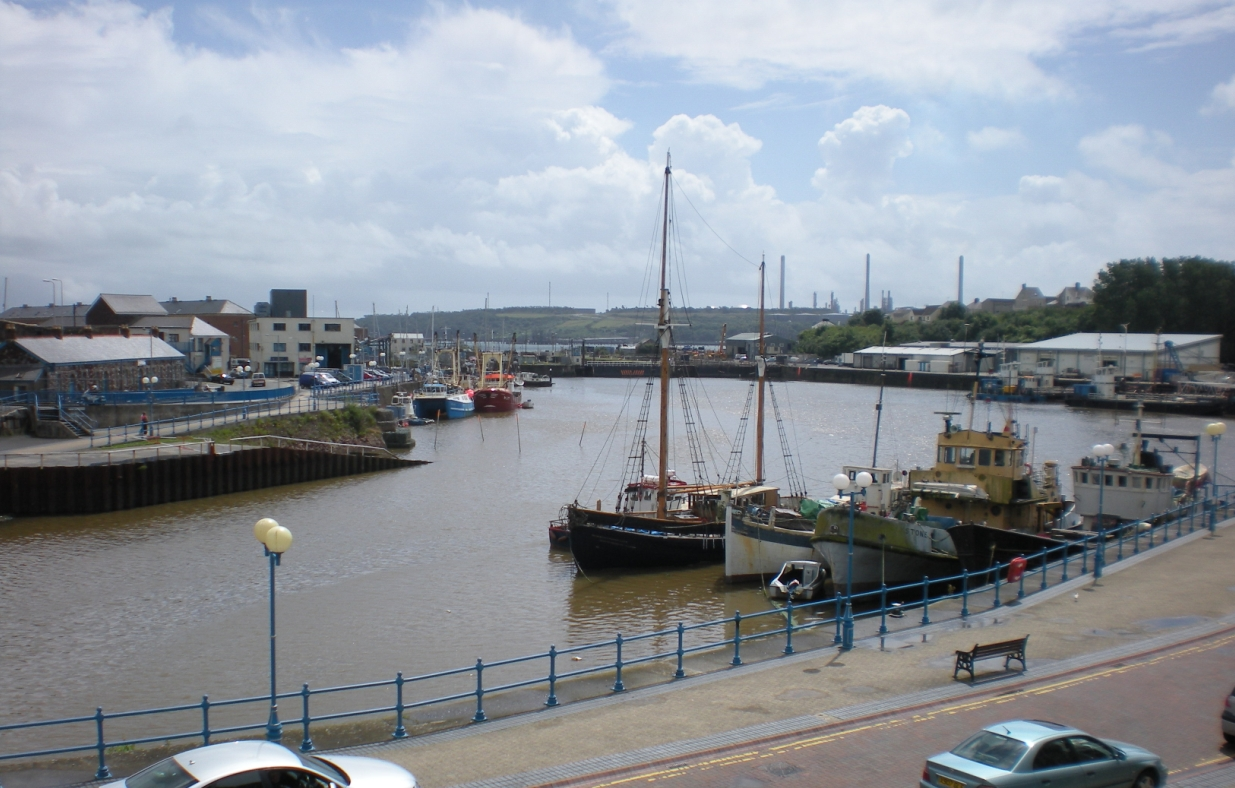
Milford Haven: Wales' largest fishing port is base of FPV Rhodri Morgan, the largest of the government's ships.

The division maintains a multi-million pound fleet consisting of five Fisheries Patrol Vessels (FPVs)—high speed boats used for law enforcement and protecting the fishing industry from illegal activity. They were built in Pembrokeshire by Mainstay Marine Solutions, and named after prominent Welsh people.

Vessel	Length (m)	Breadth (m)	Weight (ton)	Namesake
FPV Rhodri Morgan	26	5	75	Rhodri Morgan
FPV Lady Megan	19	8	56	Megan Lloyd George
FPV Catrin	13	4		Catrin Glyndŵr
FPV Gwenllian				Gwenllian of Wales
FPV Siwan				Joan of Wales

=== Pride of Wales ===
Upon being retired by the Welsh Government in 2019, FPV Aegis was renamed to Pride of Wales and donated to Liberia as part of the Wales for Africa programme, for the purpose of protecting more than 40,000 Liberian fishermen from foreign trawlers operating illegally in Liberian waters.

== Ensign ==
Welsh Government ensign

An ensign for use aboard ships used by the Welsh Government, such as the patrol boats of the Marine and Fisheries Division, was granted in 2017.

The flag is a British Blue Ensign defaced with a yellow dragon with red claws and tongue. Such blue ensigns are conventionally used to indicate government-controlled ships, and the dragon is a traditional symbol of Wales.

It was designed in 2017 at the request of the Welsh Government by Red Dragon Flagmakers in conjunction with Thomas Woodcock, the Garter Principal King of Arms. On 19 December 2017, the flag's use by the Welsh Government was authorised by the UK Defence Secretary, and was registered with the College of Arms in January 2018.
