= List of flags of Finland =

The following is a list of flags of Finland. For more information, see flag of Finland.

== National flag ==
Flag	Date	Use	Description
	1920–present	Civil flag and ensign	A "sea-blue" Nordic cross on a white field. Ratio: 11:18
	1978–present	State flag and ensign	Identical to the civil flag, with the coat of arms placed in the junction of the cross. Ratio: 11:18

== Presidential flag ==
Flag	Date	Use	Description
	1978–present	Used by the President	Similar to the war flag and ensign, but with the Cross of Liberty in gold and blue in the upper hoist. Ratio: 11:19
	1944–1946	Used by President, Field Marshal C.G.E. Mannerheim	Triple-tailed flag, ratio: 11:19
	1920–1944, 1946–1978	Used by the President	Triple-tailed flag, ratio: 11:19
	1978–present	Presidential pennant of Finland	

=== Regent of Finland ===
Flag	Date	Use	Description
	1918–1919	Used by the Regent	Standard of the Regent of Finland

== Military flag ==
Flag	Date	Use	Description
	1920–present	Commander of the Finnish Defence Forces	Current version adopted in 1978
	1920–present	Minister of Defence	Current version adopted in 1978

=== Navy ===
Flag	Date	Use	Description
	1978–present	War flag and ensign	Similar to the state flag and ensign, but with a three-pointed swallowtail fly. Ratio: 11:19
	1920–1978	War flag and ensign	Triple-tailed flag, ratio: 11:19
	1918–1920	War flag and ensign	Triple-tailed flag, ratio: 11:19
	1919–present	Naval jack	Flag ratio: 1:1
	1919	Naval jack	Flag ratio: 1:1
	?–present	Masthead pennant of Finland	
	1978–present	Flag of the Commander of the Finnish Navy	
	?–present	Pennant of Commander of Naval Command	
	?–present	Director of Naval College and Commander of a Naval Squadron	
	?–present	Commander of Flotilla	
	?–present	Semi-flotilla Commander	
	?–present	Senior officer at anchor in harbour	
	2015–present	Flag of Naval Reconnaissance Battalion of Finnish Navy	

=== Air Force ===
Flag	Date	Use	Description
	1957–present	Flag of the Lapland Air Command	
	1957–present	Flag of the Karelia Air Command	
	1957–present	Flag of the Satakunta Air Command	
	1957–present	Flag of the Air Force Academy	

== Civil Maritime Flags ==
Flag	Date	Use	Description
	1920–1978	Pilot flag	
	1919–1920	Pilot flag	
	1918	Temporary official merchant ensign	Official merchant ensign of the independent Finnish state in 1918.

== Diplomatic services flags ==
Flag	Date	Use	Description
	1918–1920	Ambassador and Minister Plenipotentiary	
	1918–1920	Charge d'Affairs	

== Customs Flags ==
Flag	Date	Use	Description
	1920–1978	Customs flag of Finland	
	1919–1920	Customs flag of Finland	
	1827–1917	Customs Flag of Finland Grand Duchy of Finland	

== Postal Flags ==
Flag	Date	Use	Description
	1939–1978	Postal flag of Finland	
	1918–1939	Postal flag of Finland	

== Vexillology Association flags ==
Flag	Date	Use	Description
		Flag of the Partioheraldikot r.y.	

== Regions ==
Flag	Administrative division	Adopted	Description
	Åland	1954–present	Flag of Åland
	Central Finland	1898–present	A banner of arms based on the region's coat of arms. Ratio: 1:1
	Central Ostrobothnia	?–present	A Canadian pale flag with a white marten and five crosses from the region's coat of arms.
	Kainuu	1998–present	A banner of arms based on the region's coat of arms designed by a Finnish heraldist Olof Eriksson in 1978. The flag itself was adopted on the 25th of June, 1998.
	Kanta-Häme	2018–present	Flag featuring elements from the region's coat of arms. Designed by heraldist Tuomas Hyrsky and adopted by the regional council on the 100th anniversary of the Finnish flag on the 28th of May, 2018. A further ceremony was held in the Häme Castle on the 4th of February, 2019.
	North Karelia	1997–present	A red flag featuring two armored arms from the regional coat of arms with a fortressy white field on the hoist side of the flag. Adopted by the regional council on the 8th of June, 1997.
	North Savo	?–present	A black swallow-tailed flag featuring a loaded bow from the regional coat of arms placed between two yellow stripes.
	Päijät-Häme	?–present	A banner of arms based on the region's coat of arms.
	Satakunta	1990–present	A swallow-tailed banner of arms based on the region's coat of arms from 1557. Designed by artist Reino Niiniranta and officially adopted on the 21st of November, 1990. The regional flag's official flag day is on the 11th of October, on the name day of Otso.
	South Ostrobothnia	?–present	A banner of arms based on the region's coat of arms.
	South Savo	2020–present	A black flag charged with the bow and arrow from the region's coat of arms and a yellow hoist. Designed by designer Suvi Ripatti and officially adopted on the 9th of June, 2020.
	Uusimaa	?–present	A banner of arms based on the region's coat of arms.

=== City and municipality flags ===
Flag	Administrative division		Adopted	Description
Flag of Helsinki (long)	Helsinki sijainti Suomi	Helsinki	?–present	An official city flag based on the city's coat of arms.
Joensuu.lippu	Joensuu sijainti Suomi	Joensuu	2008–present	
Lieksa lippu	Lieksa sijainti Suomi	Lieksa	?–present	
Oulu.lippu	Oulu sijainti Suomi	Oulu	?–present	
Pori.lippu	Pori sijainti Suomi	Pori	?–present	
	Raisio sijainti Suomi	Raisio	?–present	A banner of arms based on the municipality's coat of arms.
Rovaniemi.lippu	Rovaniemi sijainti Suomi	Rovaniemi	?–present	
	Saarijärvi sijainti Suomi	Saarijärvi	?–present	
Tampere.lippu	Tampere sijainti Suomi	Tampere	1960–present	The flag is based on the city's coat of arms.
Turku.lippu	Turku sijainti Suomi	Turku	?–present	

=== Pennants ===
Flag	Date	Use	Description
Finnish general pennant		Finnish household pennant	Used generally instead of a regional pennant.
Pennant of Swedish-speaking Finns		Finnish household pennant	Used by Swedish-speaking Finns.

Finnish regions also have traditional Household pennants.

== Political flags ==
Flag	Date	Party	Description
	1997–present	Communist Party of Finland	
	1995–present	Socialist League	
	1993–2010	Patriotic People's Movement	
	1941–1944	National Socialists of Finland	
	1934–1944	Finnish-Socialist Workers' Party	
	1930–1936	Blue-and-Blacks	

== Ethnic groups flags ==
Flag	Date	Use	Description
	1986–present	Flag of the Sami people	Sámi flag
	1919–present	National flag of the Ingrians	
	1920–present	Ethnic flag of the Karelians	
	2022–present	Cultural flag of the Forest Finns	
	19th century–present	Unofficial flag of the Swedish-speaking Finns	Flag of the Swedish-speaking Finns
	1905–1917	Flag used during the years of russification by Finnish speaking population.	
	1905–1917	Flag used during the years of russification by Swedish speaking population.	

== Historical flags ==
Flag	Date	Use	Description
	1920–1978	State flag and ensign	Ratio: 11:18
	1918–1920	Flag of the Kingdom of Finland and Republic of Finland from 1919 to 1920.	Blue Nordic cross on white field Flag ratio: 11:18
	1918–1920	State flag and ensign	Ratio: 11:18
	1918	Used by Finnish Socialist Workers' Republic	Red flag
	1860s–1917 1917–1918	Unofficial national flag Temporary official state flag	Commonly used as an unofficial national flag of the Grand Duchy of Finland since the mid-19th century, especially during the period of russification in 1899–1917, by all population groups. Official state flag of the independent Finnish state in 1917–1918, and used by the Whites in the Finnish Civil War.
	1914–1917	Flag for private use; also planned state flag	A tricolour of horizontal stripes, white, blue and red, with a yellow canton with the coat of arms.
	1853–1855	Temporary civil ensign of the Grand Duchy of Finland	Used during the Crimean War
	1896–1917	The national flag of the Russian Empire	Used in Finland when it was an autonomous grand duchy under the Russian Emperor's influence
	1858–1896	The state flag of the Russian Empire	Used in Finland when it was an autonomous grand duchy under the Russian Emperor's influence
	1848–1863	Unofficial civil flag of the Grand Duchy of Finland	The first known "Flag of Finland" was presented in 1848, along with the national anthem Maamme. Its motif was the coat of arms of Finland, surrounded by laurel leaves, on a white flag.
	1650–1809	Flag of Sweden	Used in Finland when it was part of the Kingdom of Sweden
	1537–1650	Flag of Sweden	Used in Finland when it was part of the Kingdom of Sweden
	1397–1537	Flag of the Kalmar Union	Used in Finland when it was partially part of the Kalmar Union
	1100–1397	Flag of Sweden	Used in Finland when it was conquered by the Kingdom of Sweden

== Proposed flags ==
Flag	Date	Use	Description
	pre–1863	Zacharias Topelius' proposal	
	1863	Anonymous proposal	
	1863	Anonymous proposal	
	1863	Anonymous proposal	
	1863	Anonymous proposal	
	1863	Otto Donner's proposal	
	1863	Maamies' proposal	
	1863	Anonymous proposal	
	1863	Anonymous proposal	
	1863	Anonymous proposal	
	1863	Anonymous proposal	Currently used as flag of the Swedish-speaking Finns
	1863	Hugo Nyberg's proposal	
	1863	J. Penger's proposal	
	1863	Anonymous proposal	
	1863	Anonymous proposal	
	1863	Anonymous proposal	
	1863	Anonymous proposal	
	1863	Anonymous proposal	

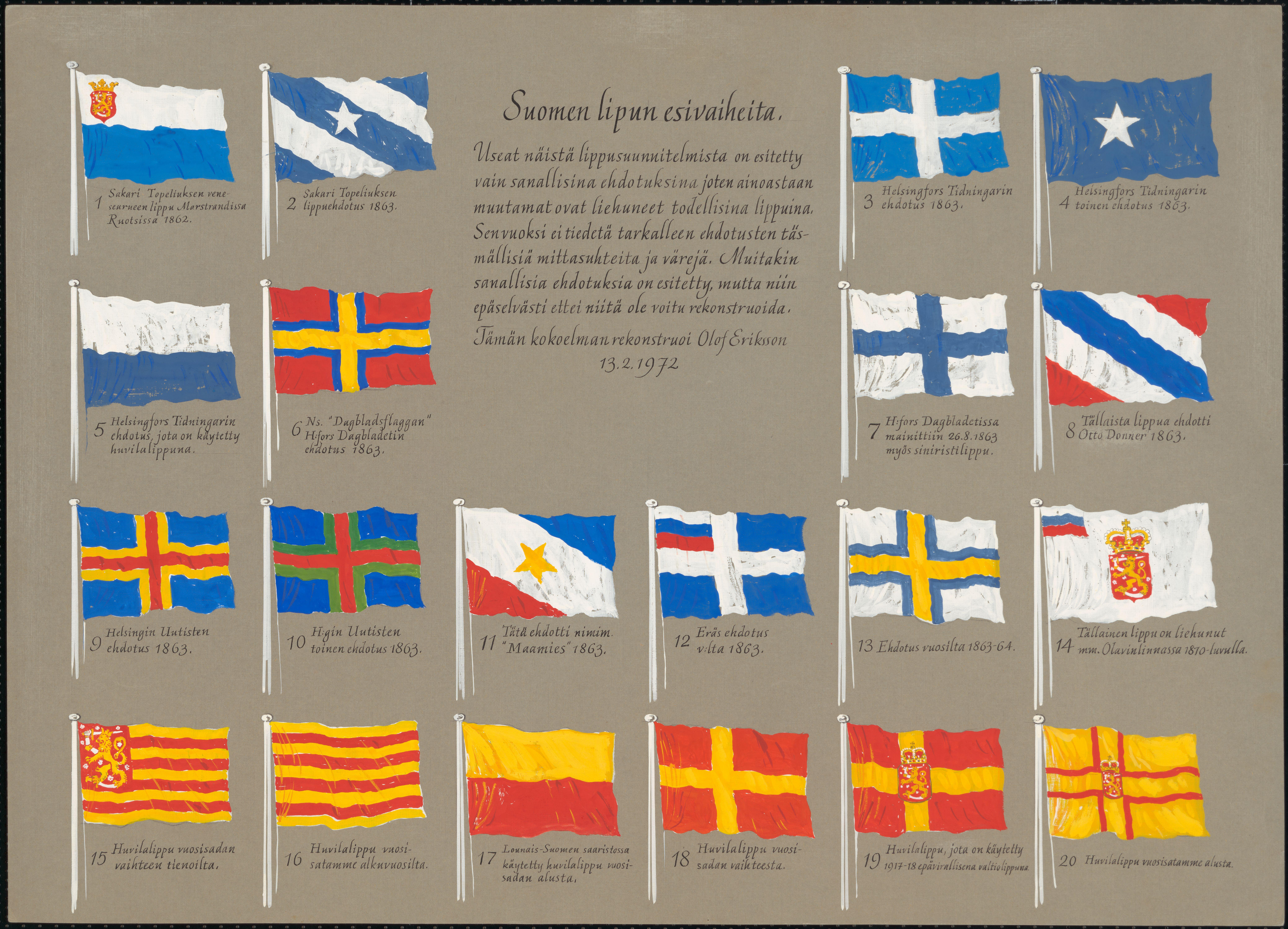
Proposals for a Finnish national flag from 1862 to 1918, first page.

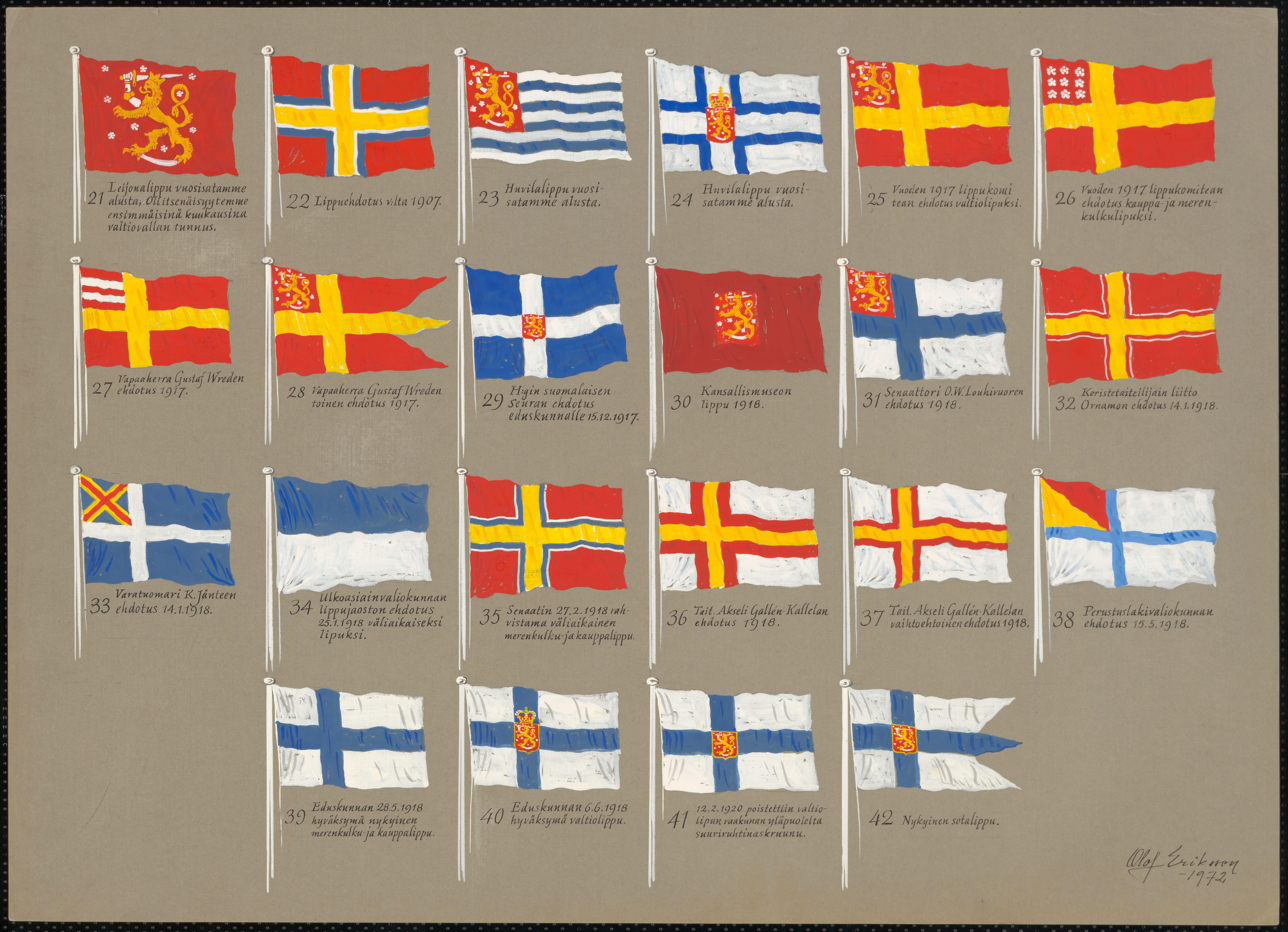
Proposals for a Finnish national flag from 1862 to 1918, second page.

== Finnish shipping companies from year 1562–present ==
Flag	Date	Use	Description
	1959–present	Viking Line	
	1883–1990	Finland Steamship Company	

== Finnish yacht clubs ==
Flag	Date	Use	Description
	1920–present	Flag of Finnish yacht clubs	Variant of the national flag; flown by pleasure craft of yacht club members. Yacht club emblem replaces the circled x in canton
	1869–1920	Yacht club ensign of the Grand Duchy of Finland	Yacht club emblem in canton.

Flag	Club
	Gamlakarleby Segelförening (Burgee)
	Gamlakarleby Segelförening (Burgee for motorboats)
	Gamlakarleby Segelförening (Ensign)
	Helsingfors Segelklubb (Burgee for motorboats)
	Helsingfors Segelsällskap (Burgee for motorboats)
	Helsingfors Segelsällskap (Ensign)
	Nyländska Jaktklubben (Burgee)
	Nyländska Jaktklubben (Burgee for motorboatse)
	Nyländska Jaktklubben (Ensign)
	Segelföreningen i Björneborg (Burgee)
	Segelföreningen i Björneborg (Ensign)
	Oulun Merenkävijät (Ensign)

== Åland ==
Flag	Date	Use	Description
	1954–present	Flag of Åland	
	?–present	Åland yacht club ensign	Swallow-tailed version of the Åland flag. Yacht club emblem replaces the circle in canton
	?–present	Pennant of Åland	

=== Historical Åland flags ===
Flag	Date	Use	Description
	1922–1954	Unofficial flag of Åland	

=== Proposed flags for Åland ===
Flag	Date	Use	Description
	1939	Matts Dreijer's proposal	
	1946	Matts Dreijer's proposal	
	1950s	The "Pestflaggan"	
	1952	"Swedish" flag proposal	
	1953	Debate proposal 1	
	1953	Debate proposal 2	
	1953	Debate proposal 3	
	1954	"Finnish" flag proposal	

== See also ==
- Flag of Finland
- Household pennant
- Coat of arms of Finland
