= NJK =

NJK may refer to:

- Norwegian Railway Club
- Nyländska Jaktklubben
