= Eero Snellman =

Finnish painter (1890–1951)

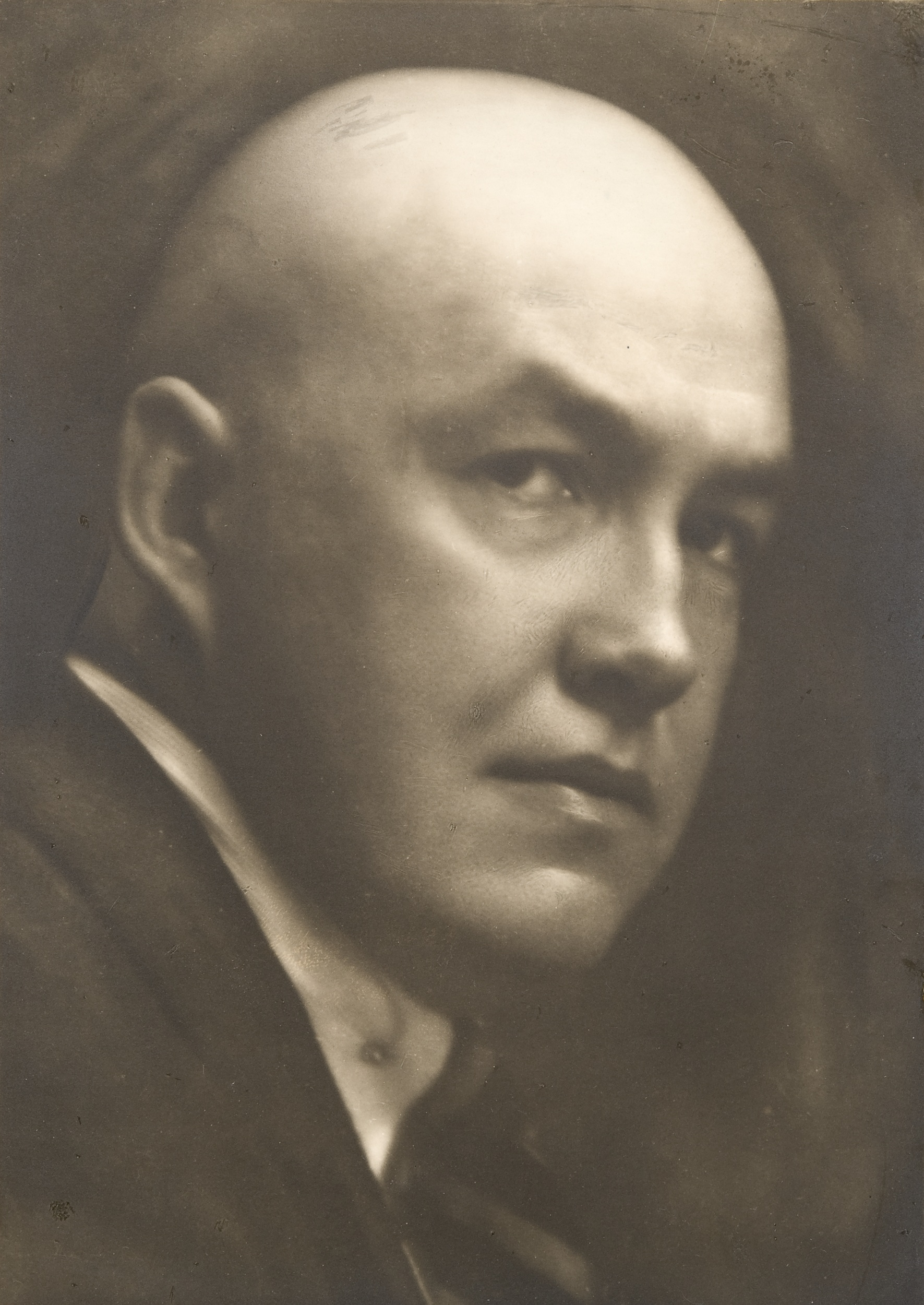
Eero Snellman.

Eero Juhani Snellman (June 8, 1890 in Helsinki – November 7, 1951 in Helsinki) was a Finnish artist. He co-designed the Flag of Finland with Bruno Tuukkanen.

Snellman studied art in Helsinki in 1908–1910 and continued his studies in France, Italy, Germany, United States, Mexico, and England between 1910 and 1930. When he lived in Paris, he was the initiator of the Cité internationale des arts center.

Snellman was known as a portrait painter. He also painted landscapes; one of his renowned painting is Laatokan maisema, 1921. His style has been characterized as post-impressionistic.

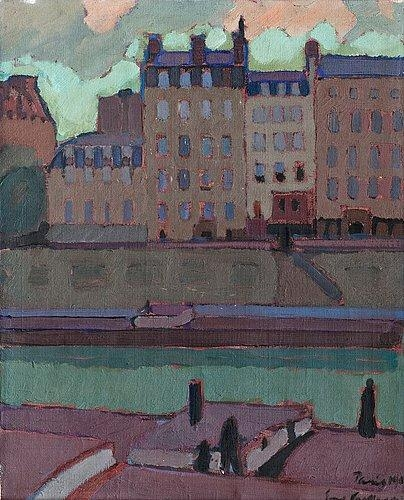
"View of the Seine" by Eero Snellman (1913)
