= Flag of Finland =

Republic of Finland
- National flag
- Use: Civil flag and ensign
- Proportion: 11:18
- Adopted: 28 May 1918; 108 years ago
- Design: Sea-blue Nordic cross on white field. Dimensions: 4:3:4 (vertically); 5:3:10 (horizontally)
- State flag
- Use: State flag and ensign
- Proportion: 11:18
- Adopted: 1978
- Design: Sea-blue Nordic cross on white field, rectangular coat of arms of Finland (colours gold and silver on red)
- Tailed state flag
- Use: War flag and naval ensign
- Proportion: 11:19
- Adopted: 1978
- Design: Sea-blue Nordic cross on white field, rectangular coat of arms of Finland (colours gold and silver on red), swallow-tailed. Dimensions: 4:3:4 (vertically); 5:3:6:5 (horizontally)
- Flag of the president of the Republic of Finland
- Use: Presidential standard
- Proportion: 11:19
- Adopted: 1918
- Design: Sea-blue Nordic cross on white field, rectangular coat of arms of Finland (colours gold and silver on red), swallow-tailed, Cross of Liberty in canton (colors gold on blue)
- Use: Naval jack
- Proportion: 1:1
- Adopted: 1918
- Design: A white field with the coat of arms of Finland in the center

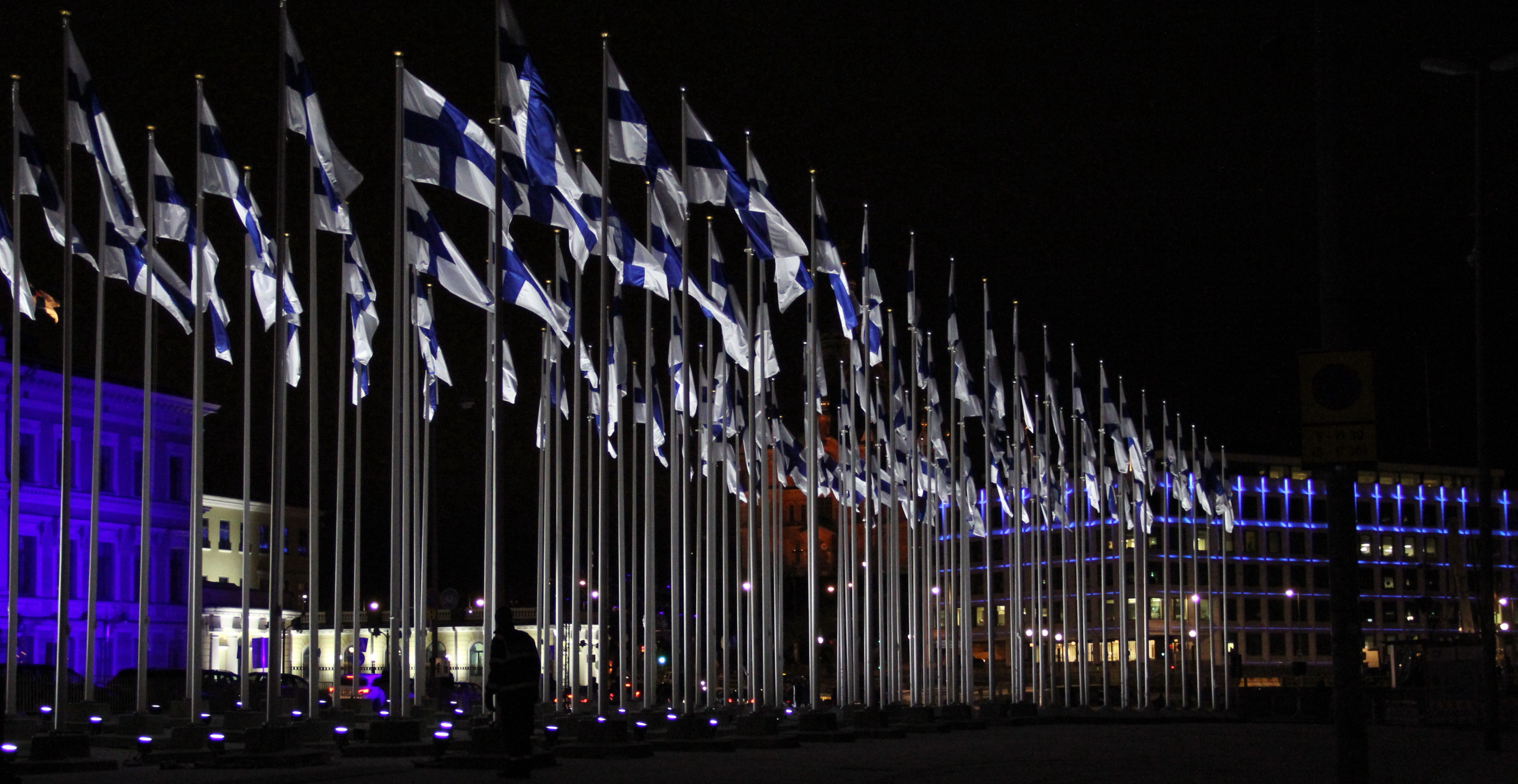
One hundred Finnish flags waving during Finland’s 100th independence day

The national flag of Finland, also known in Finnish as the siniristilippu ('Blue Cross Flag'), dates from the beginning of the 20th century. The flag was adopted after independence from the Russian Empire, but its design has roots in the 19th century.

Symbolically, blue is said to represent the country's thousands of lakes and the sky, and white the snow that covers the land in winter. The colour combination has also been used historically in various Finnish provincial, military and town flags. The Nordic cross pattern connects to the shared tradition with other Nordic countries. While the cross itself is a Christian symbol and holds this meaning for some Finns, for many, the flag's primary association is with the nation's identity.

The flag has two main variations: the civil flag and the state flag. The state flag has the Finnish coat of arms in the centre, but is otherwise identical to the civil flag. Other variations are the swallow-tailed state flag used by the military, and the presidential standard, which is identical to the swallow-tailed state flag but also has in its upper-left corner the Cross of Liberty.

== History ==
The first known "Flag of Finland" was presented in 1848, along with the de facto national anthem "Maamme". Its motif was the coat of arms of Finland surrounded by laurel leaves on a white flag.

The current blue-crossed design was first used in Finland by Nyländska Jaktklubben, a yacht club founded in Helsinki in 1861. In addition to the blue cross on the white background, the yacht club flag had the crowned arms of the province of Uusimaa within two crossed branches in the upper hoist quarter. Except for the position of the cross, the flag was similar to the flag of the St. Petersburg Yacht Club, which had been founded the previous year. The design can be traced to the Russian Navy's ensign, which has a blue cross saltire on a white background. During the Crimean War, Finnish merchant ships that were captured by the British-French fleet flew a flag called Flag of St. George, which was based on the Russian Customs flag. This variant had the cross was thinner than in the modern flag, and the proportions were equal. Another flag with a blue cross was made official in 1861 for private vessels.

In 1910, in connection with Russification of Finland, the Russian authorities decreed for a Russian flag to be added to the canton. However, it was met with resistance and was derided as the "slave's flag" (orjalippu), and most Finns refused to fly it. Instead, a triangular pennant without this modification was flown, thereby circumventing the decree concerning flags.

Shortly after Finland declared its full independence in 1917, a competition was held for the design of the Finnish flag. Several different designs were submitted. Regarding the colours, the entries fell mainly into two categories: one using the red and yellow from the Finnish coat of arms and the other using the present blue and white colours.

One entry had the Dannebrog cross design but with a yellow cross on a red background. Another entry had diagonal blue and white stripes, but it was criticized as being more suitable for a barber shop than a newly independent country. Akseli Gallen-Kallela proposed a similar cross flag but with colours inverted (white cross on blue), but this was considered too similar to the Swedish flag and particularly the contemporary Greek flag. Finally, the artists Eero Snellman and Bruno Tuukkanen specified the final form of the flag. According to tradition, the flag was based on a design by the poet Zachris Topelius in about 1860.

The Finnish state flag was further modified in 1920, when the shield-shaped coat of arms with a coronet was changed into a rectangular-shaped one. The blue on the flag was also darkened.

== Legal definition ==
=== Size ===
Under Finnish law, the ratio of the flag is 11:18 (height:width), very close to the golden ratio. The swallow-tailed state flag is one unit longer, and the tails are five units long. The cusp width of the blue cross is three units of measure, giving a ratio set of 4:3:4 (vertical) and 5:3:10 (horizontal). When flown from a flagpole, the flag is recommended to have a width equalling one-sixth of the height of the pole.

=== Usage ===
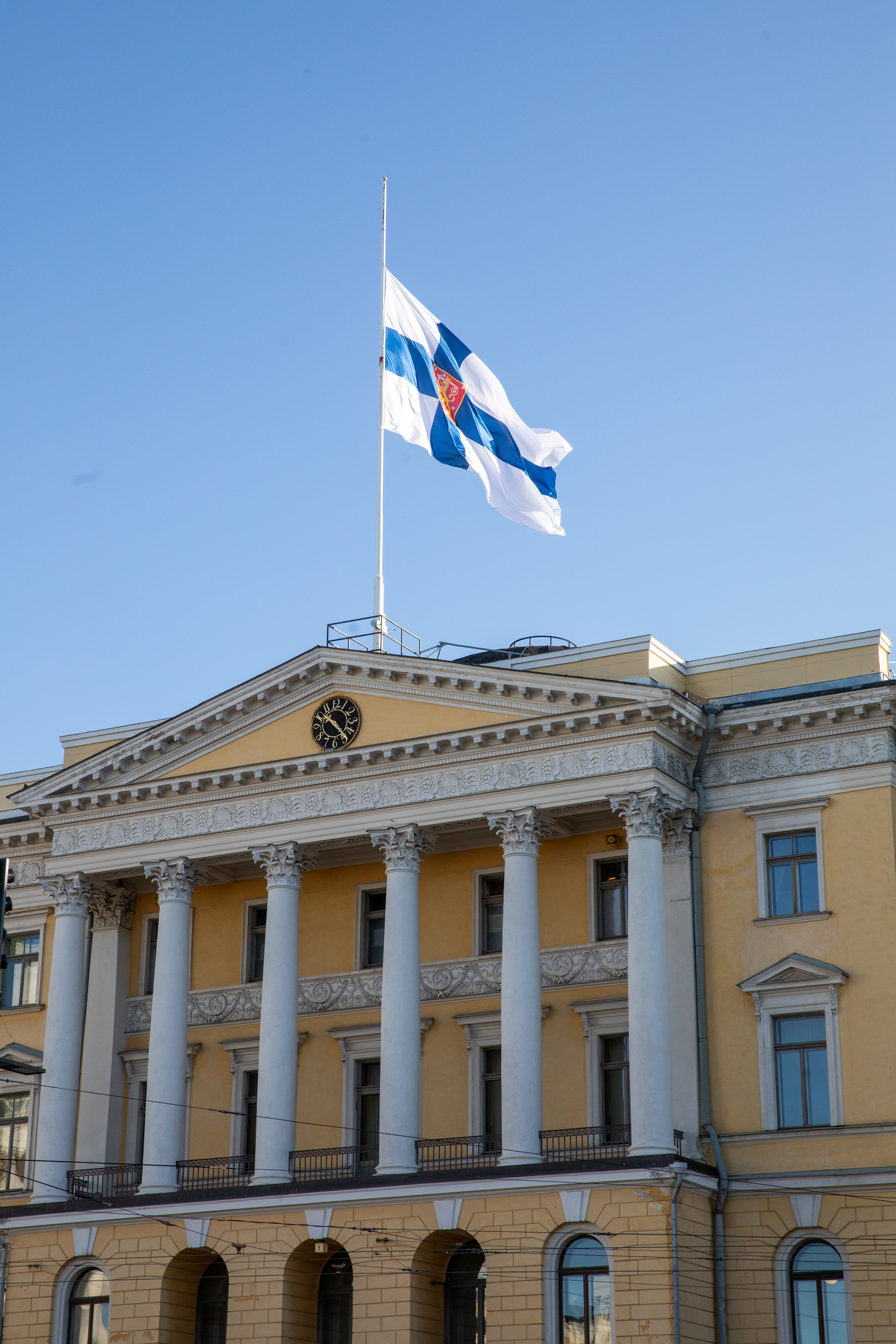
The headquarters of the Finnish Government on Senate Square, Helsinki, seen flying the State flag at half-mast, due to the death of President Ahtisaari.

The Finnish flag is used in three main variants. The usual national flag is used by all citizens, organisations and Finnish municipalities and regions. Anyone is allowed to fly the national flag whenever it is deemed to be suitable. The rectangular state flag is used by bodies of the Finnish national and provincial governments, by the cathedral chapters of the two national churches (Evangelical Lutheran and Orthodox) and non-naval vessels of the state.

The swallow-tailed national flag, which is also the naval ensign, is flown by the Finnish Defence Forces. The presidential standard and the command signs of the minister of defence, chief of defence, and commander of the Finnish Navy are flown only by the respective persons.

All public bodies as well as most private citizens and corporations fly the flag on official flag flying days. In addition to the official flag flying days, there are about ten unofficial but generally observed flag flying days. Besides flag flying days, normally, no flags or corporate flags are flown. Flag Day is celebrated on Midsummer's Day.

The Finnish flag is raised at 8 am and lowered at sunset, however not later than 9 pm. On Independence Day, the flag is flown until 8 pm, regardless of the dark. On the occasion of great national tragedies, the Ministry of The Interior may recommend flying the flag at half-mast throughout the country.

As a special custom in Finland, the flag is flown at Midsummer from 6 pm of Midsummer eve until 9 pm of Midsummer's day. This is done to symbolize the fact that the darkness does not come to any part of Finland during Midsummer's Night. Midsummer is also celebrated as the day of the Finnish flag.

=== Colours ===
The current standard colours were defined in 1995 in both CIE 1931 and CIE 1976 standards, with approximate equivalents in the Natural Colour System (Swedish standard SS 01 91 22) and by the Pantone Color Matching System also given:

| Colour scheme | Blue | Red | Yellow |
|---|---|---|---|
| CIE (x, y, Y) | 0.1856, 0.1696, 5.86 | 0.576, 0.312, 10.9 | 0.486, 0.457, 45.7 |
| CIE (L*, a*, b*) | 29.06, 7.24, −36.98 | 39.4, 59.0, 29.6 | 73.4, 14.8, 79.0 |
| Natural Color System (SS 01 91 22) | 4060-R90B | 1090-Y90R | 0080-Y204 |
| Pantone | 294 C | 186 C | 123 C |
| sRGB (Approximation) | 24, 68, 126 | 181, 28, 49 | 237, 167, 0 |
| HEX (Approximation) | #18447E | #B51C31 | #EDA700 |
*Section 3 of the source gives for the CIE values illuminant D65 and measurement geometry d/2°. *Source: https://www.finlex.fi/fi/lainsaadanto/saadoskokoelma/1993/827 Government Decision 827/1993 (in Finnish)

Meanwhile, the original colors of the Finnish flag are as follows:

| Colour scheme | Blue | White |
|---|---|---|
| Pantone | 294 C | White |
| HEX | #002F6C | #FFFFFF |
| RGB | 0-47-108 | 255-255-255 |
| CMYK | 100-57-0-58 | 0-0-0-0 |

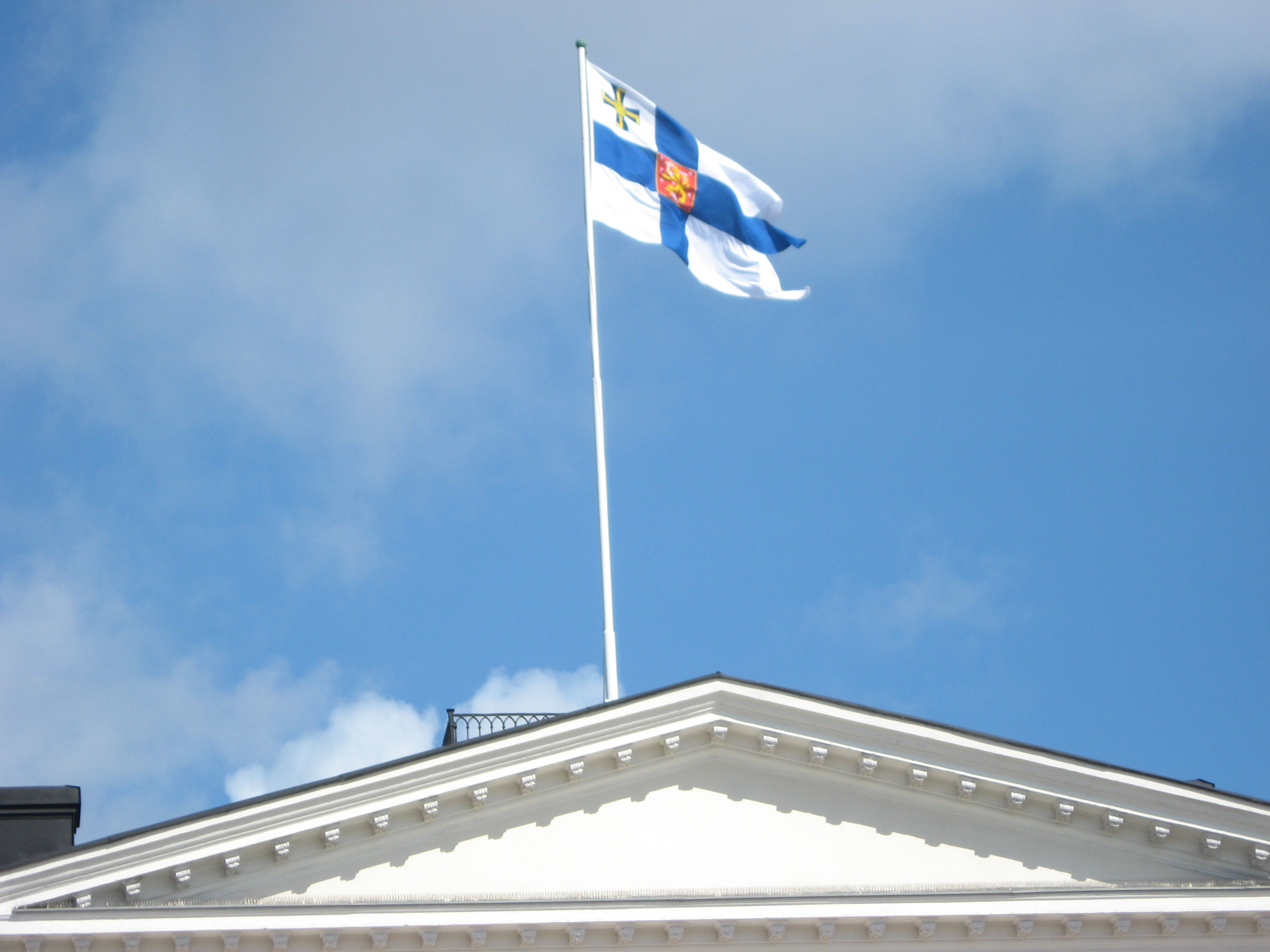
The Finnish presidential standard at the Presidential Palace, Helsinki.

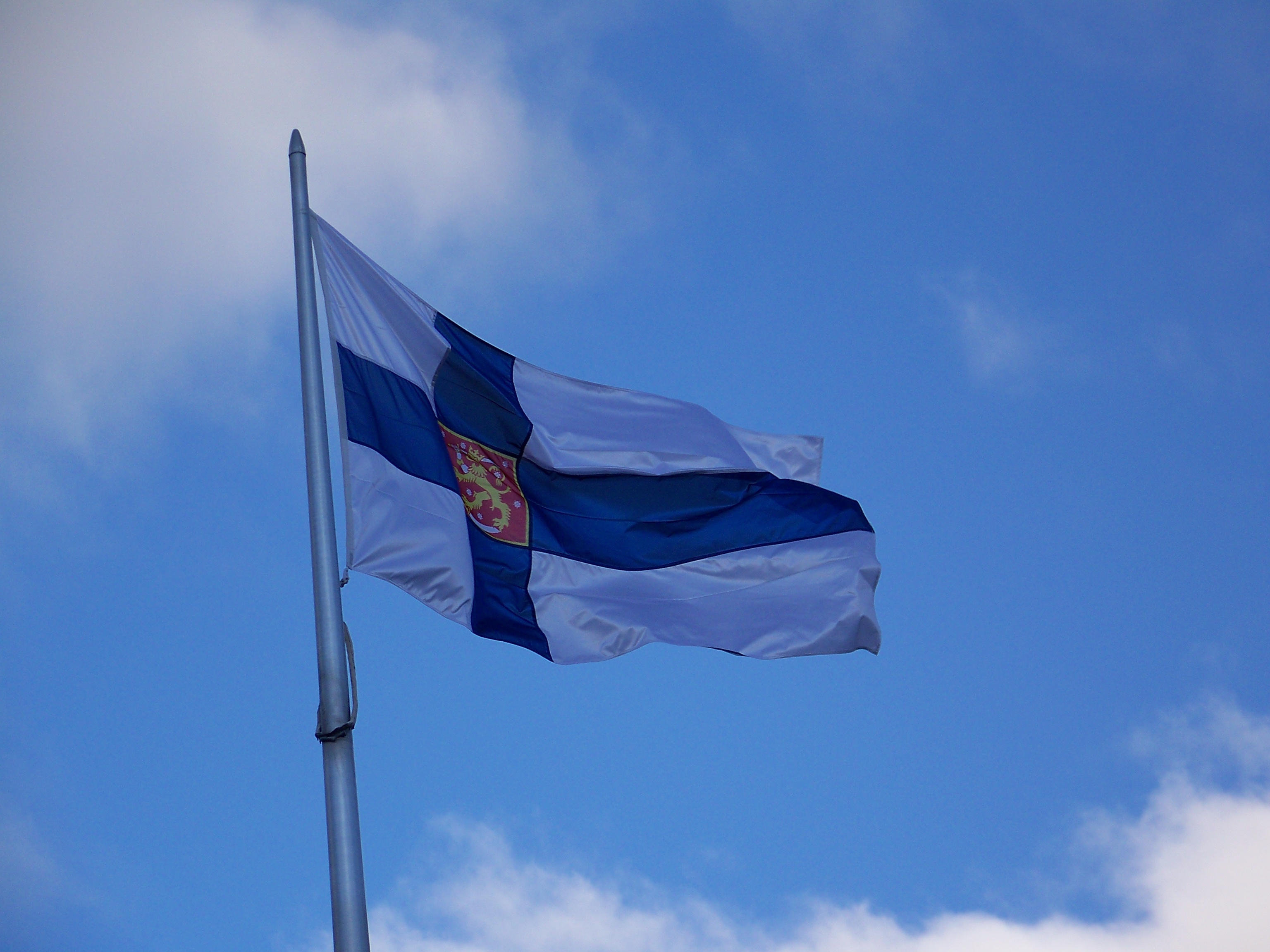
Finnish State Flag at the Finnish embassy, Canberra.

There is no official RGB version of the colours, and in fact the yellow as defined in the CIE L*a*b* standard lies outside colour gamut of the sRGB colour space. The CIE L*a*b* colours can be approximated in sRGB (range 0–255) by: blue R=24, G=68, B=126, red R=181, G=28, B=49 and yellow R=237, G=167, B=0. The blue colour is called "sea blue", which is a dark to medium blue. It is not very dark navy blue, and not any bright or greenish shade such as turquoise or cyan.

Red and yellow are used in the coat of arms that appears on the state flag.

== Other rules ==
Under Finnish law, it is forbidden to deface the flag or to use it in a disrespectful way. It is also illegal to remove a flag from its pole without permission. Anyone who breaks these regulations may be fined for disgracing the flag.

Finnish law also forbids the use of the presidential standard or state flag without permission, as well as the addition of any extra symbols to the flag. One may not sell a flag that has different colours or geometry from those defined by the law, which considered to be a violation of the regulations and may lead to a fine.

There are also common rules on how to treat the flag respectfully. The flag must not be dirty or damaged. The flag must never touch the ground. When the flag is washed, it must be dried indoors. A worn-out flag must be disposed of by burning (though not with the intent to disgrace it) or alternatively by cutting it to pieces small enough not to be recognizable as parts of the flag. The flag must not be buried in the ground or the sea (including any disposal of the flag).

In Finland, the official term for flying a flag at half-mast is known as suruliputus (mourning by flag(ging)). It is performed by raising the flag briefly to the top of the mast and lowering it approximately one-third of the length of the flagpole, placing the lower hoist corner at half-mast. On wall-mounted and rooftop flagpoles, the middle of the flag should fly at the middle of the flagpole. When removing the flag from half-mast, it is briefly hoisted to the finial before lowering completely.

Traditionally, private residences and apartment houses fly the national flag at half-mast on the day of the death of a resident, when the flag is displayed at half-mast until sunset or 9:00 p.m., whichever comes first. Flags are also flown at half-mast on the day of the burial, with the exception that the flag is to be hoisted to the finial after the inhumation takes place.

Flags are also to be flown at half-mast by government agencies and embassies across the world on the days of national mourning, and "the entire nation is asked to join in". Such days are the deaths of a former or current Finnish president, as well as significant catastrophic events such as the aftermath of the 2004 Indian Ocean earthquake and tsunami, the 2011 Norway attacks and significant national events such as the 2004 Konginkangas bus disaster and school shootings of Jokela and Kauhajoki.

Historically, flags were flown at half-mast on the Commemoration Day of Fallen Soldiers which takes place on the third Sunday of May. Originally, the flag was raised to the finial in the morning, displayed at half-mast from 10:00 a.m. to 2:00 p.m. and again raised to the finial for the rest of the day. In 1995, the 50th anniversary of the end of the Second World War, the tradition of flying the flag at half-mast was discontinued, and the flag has since been displayed at the finial in a usual manner.

== Yacht club ensigns ==
The Finnish yacht club flag design; The circled X is replaced with the club emblem; Flag ratio: 11:18

In Finland any yacht club that is registered in Finland may apply to have a flag with the club emblem officially approved for use on yachts: the civil ensign with a white cross 3/5 of a unit wide superimposed on the blue cross and with the club emblem in the upper hoist corner. Most yacht clubs distribute those ensigns to their members. The yacht club ensign is also valid national flag.

Temporary merchant navy ensign "Flag of St. George", used (1853–1856) in the Crimean War

Nyländska Jaktklubben
(1861–1910)

Nyländska Jaktklubben
(1910–1917)

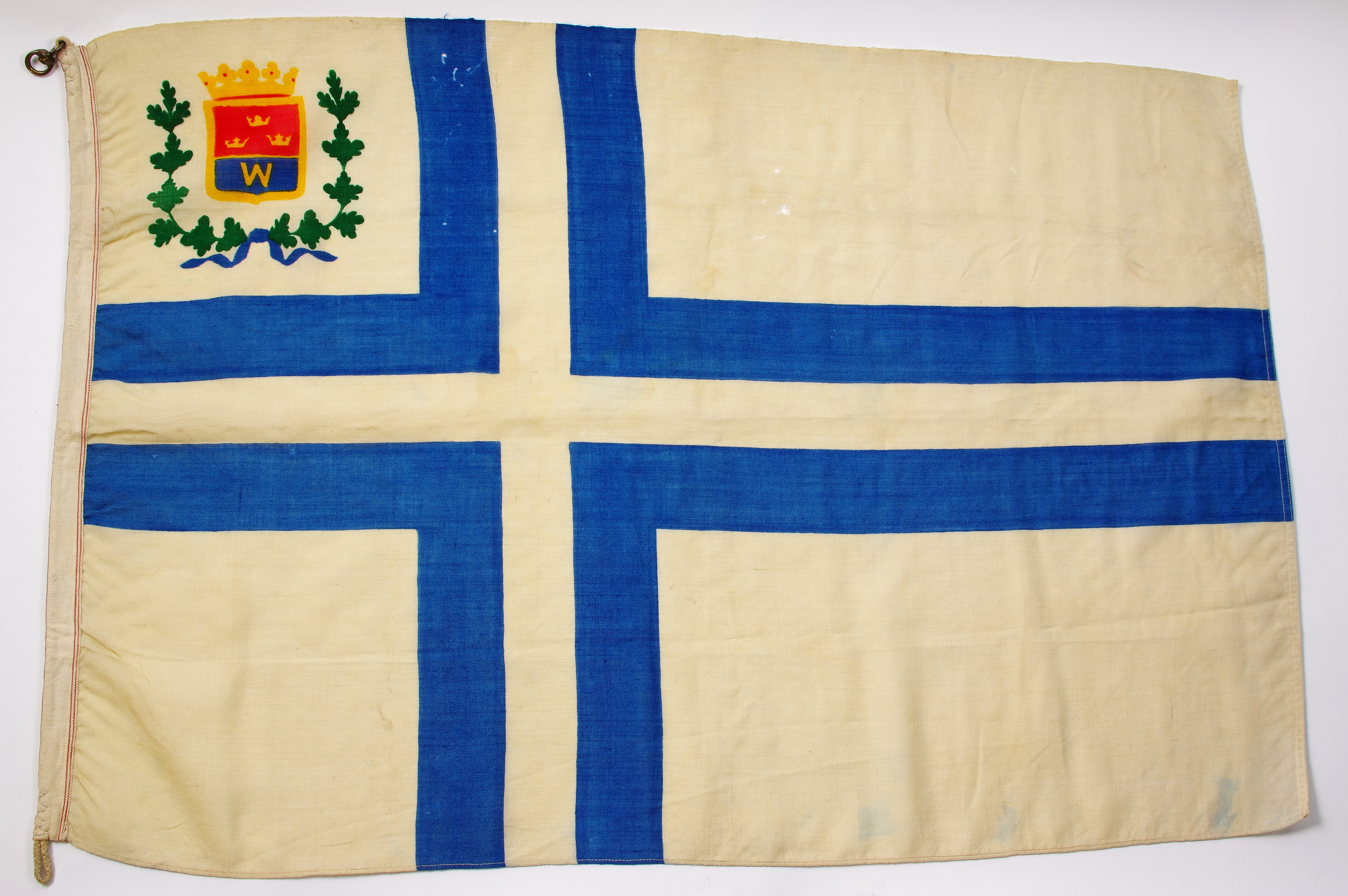
Viborg Läns Segelförening (Viipuri Province)

Current cruise flag

== Historical flags ==
Finnish flags and coat of arms according to the 1978 law

Temporary de facto state flag of Finland
(December 1917 – May 1918)

Flag of Finland
(May 1918 – 1920)

State Flag of Finland
(May 1918 – 1920)

Military Flag of Finland
(1918–1920)

Standard of the Regent of Finland
(1918–1919)
State Flag of Finland
(1920–1978)

Military Flag of Finland
(1920–1978)

Presidential Standard of Finland
(1921–1944, 1946–1978)

Presidential Standard of Finland as used by Field Marshal Mannerheim, 6th President of Finland
(1944–1946)
Pilot Flag of Finland
(1919–1920)

Pilot Flag of Finland
(1920–1978)

Customs Flag of Finland
(1919–1920)

Customs Flag of Finland
(1920–1978)
Postal Flag of Finland
(1918–1939)

Postal Flag of Finland
(1939–1978)

== Proposals ==
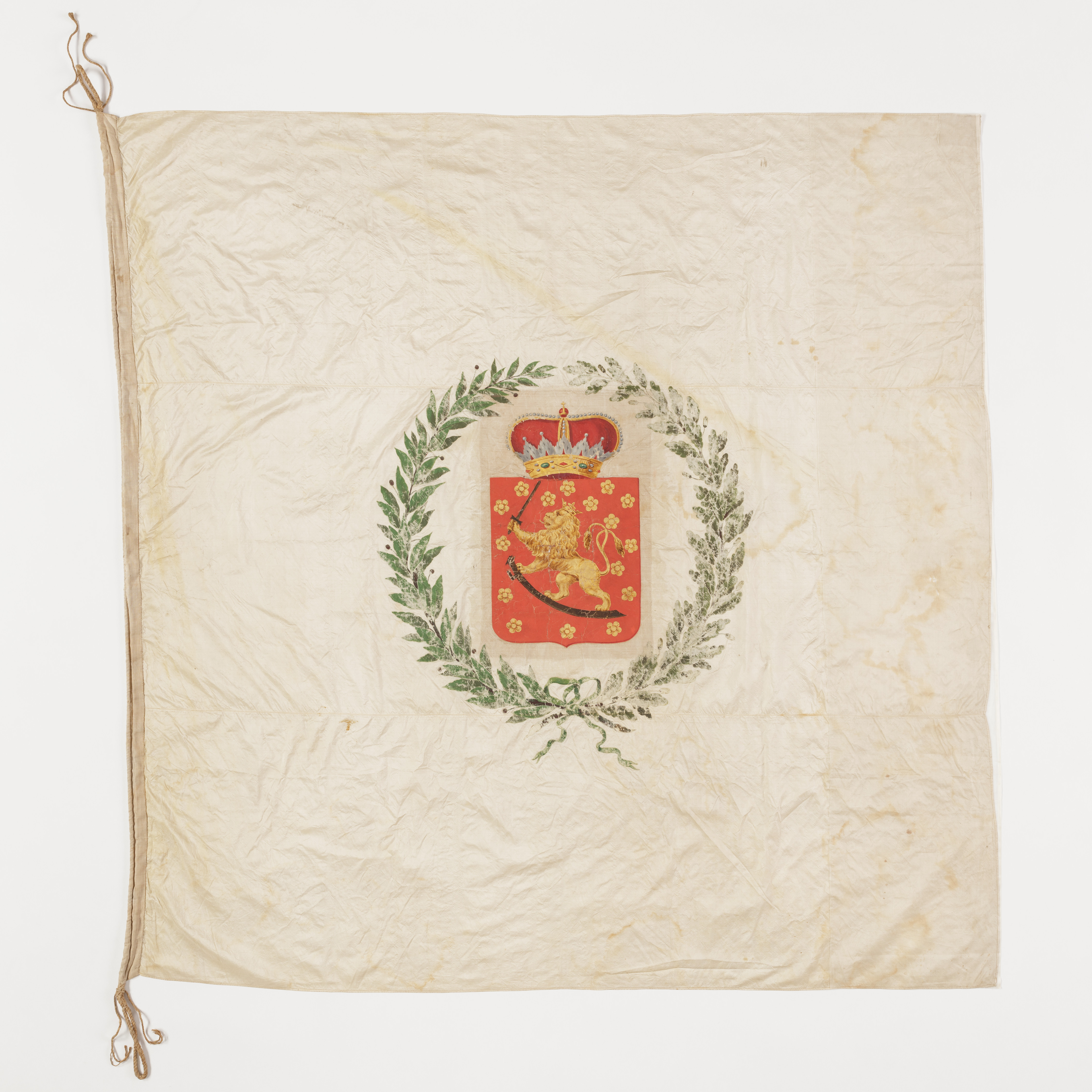
Flag of the Imperial Alexander University

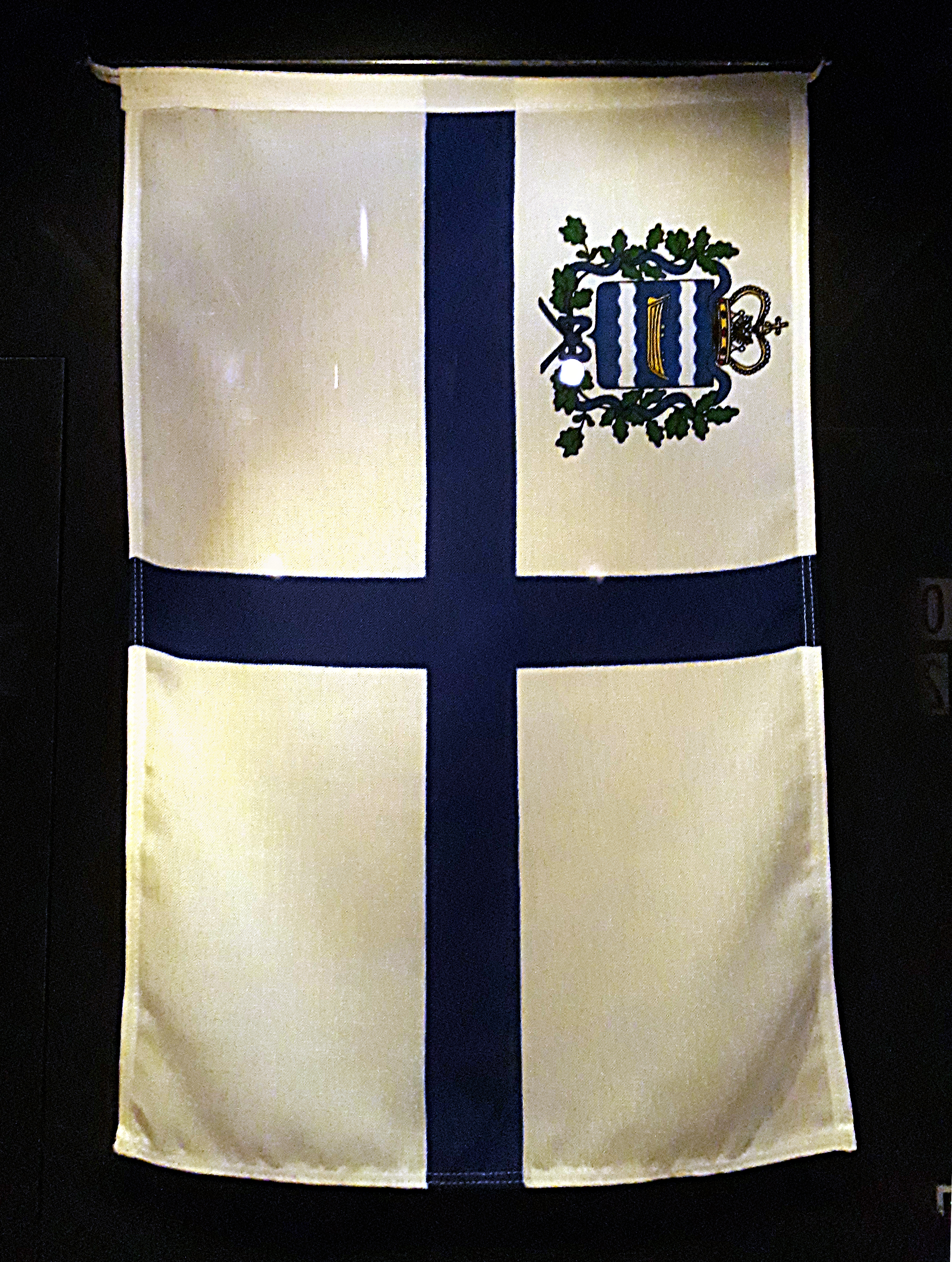
Former flag of Nyländska Jaktklubben (1861–1919), on display at the Maritime Museum of Finland in Kotka

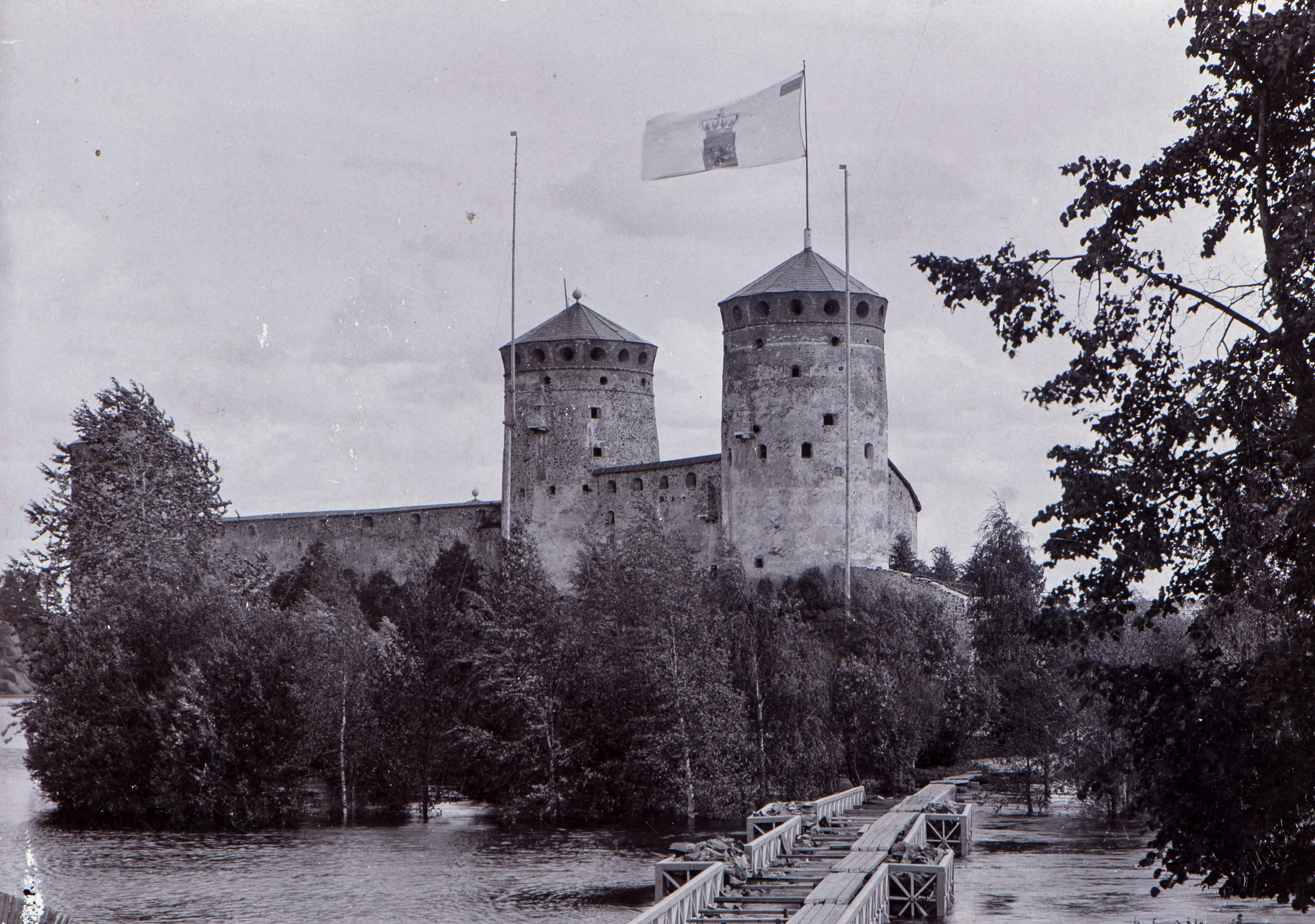
Olavinlinna in Savonlinna, Finland, from around the year 1875. Upon the castle's flag pole flies an unofficial flag featuring the flag of the Russian Empire in the canton as well as the coat of arms of the Grand Duchy of Finland.

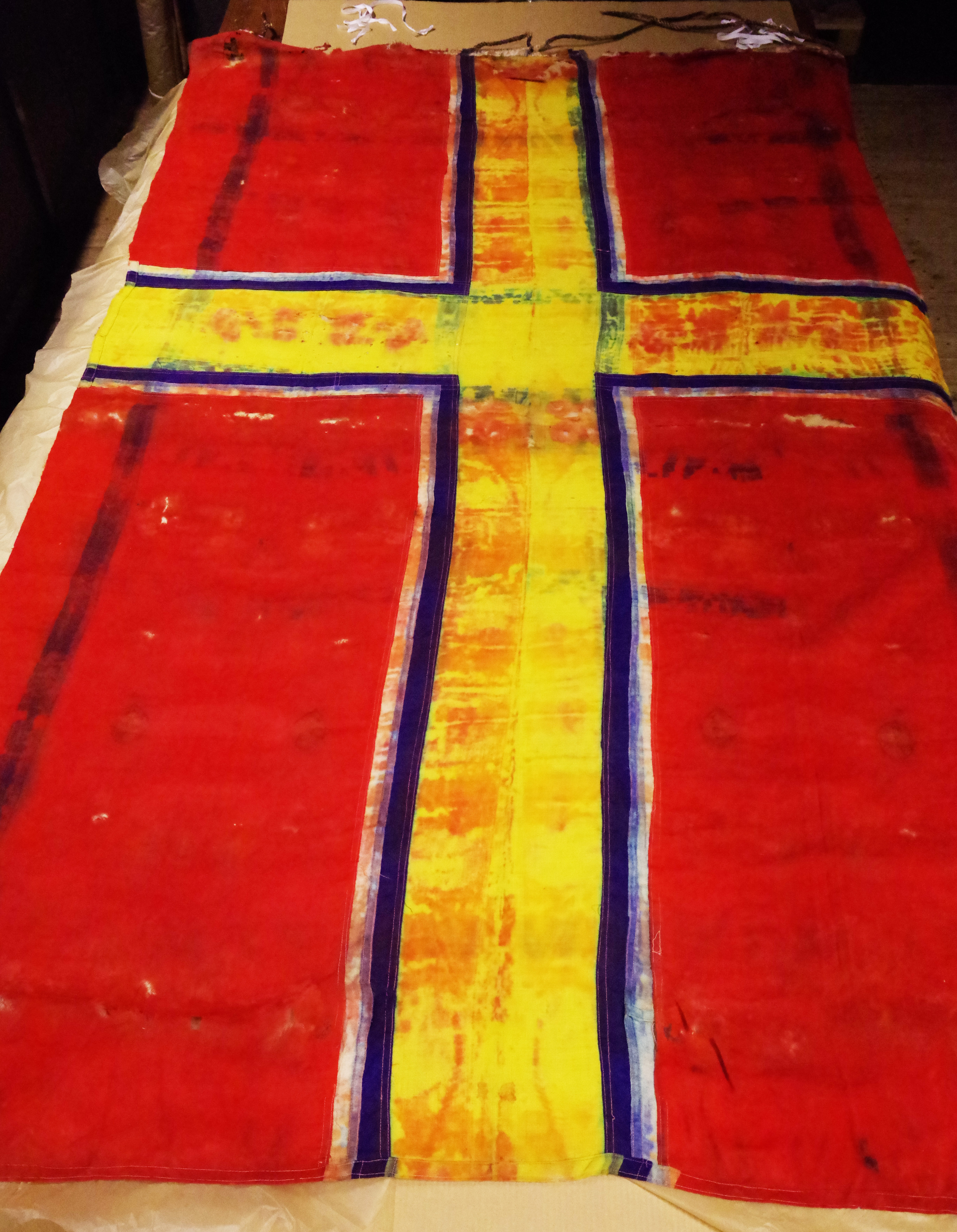
Temporary trade flag confirmed by the Senate of Vaasa

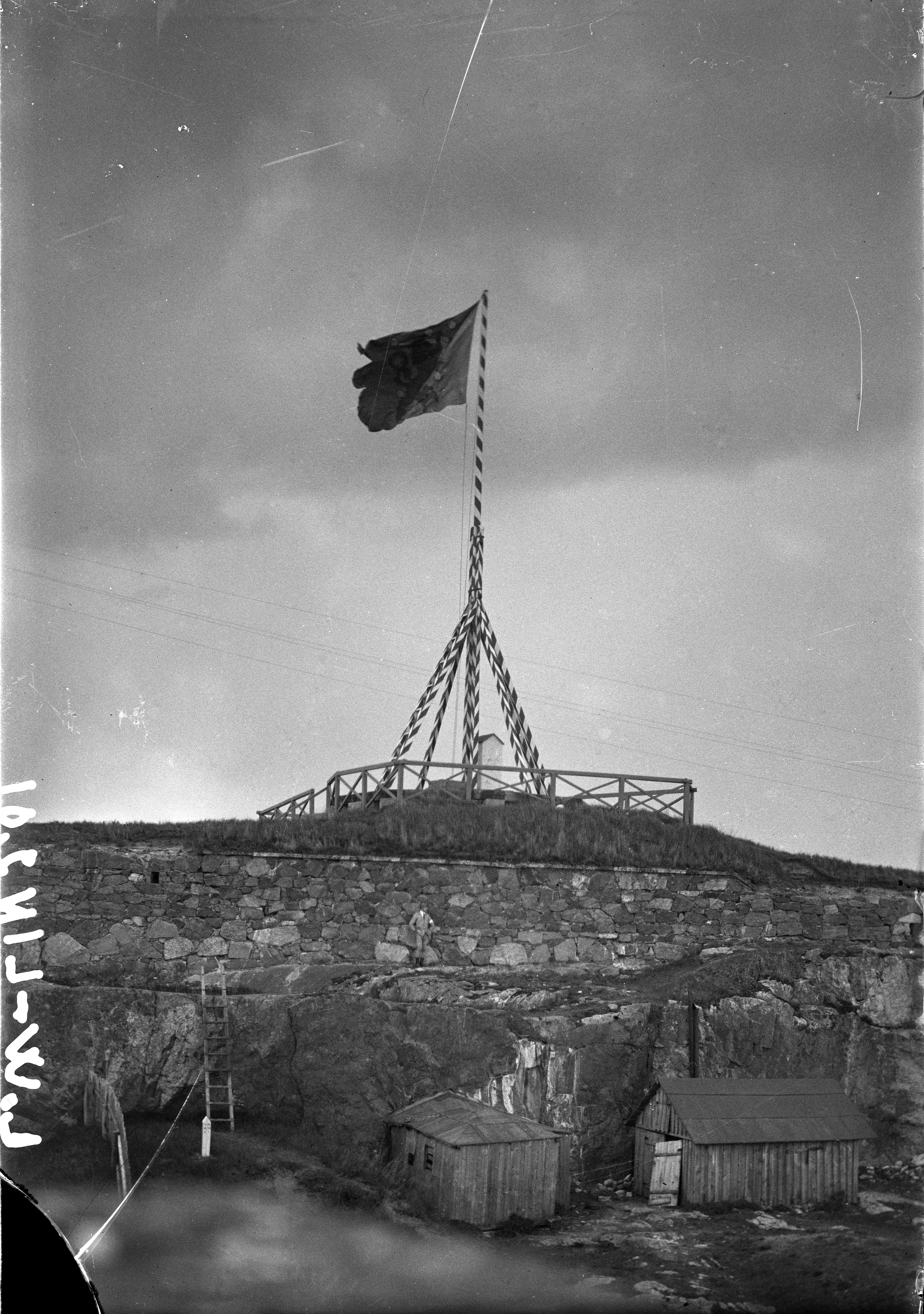
Flag with lion and roses erected at Suomenlinna, Finland, 1918

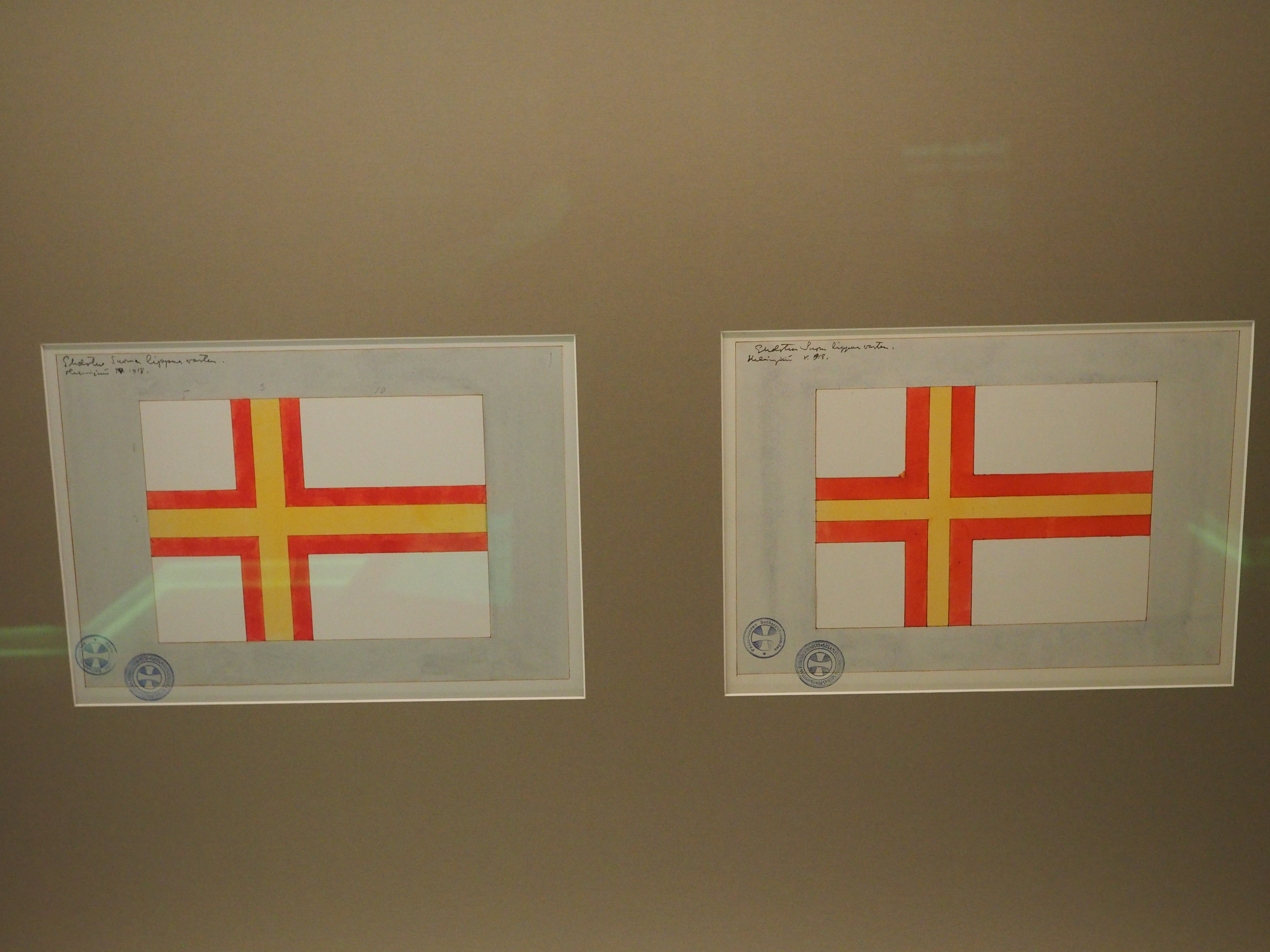
Two versions of a rejected design

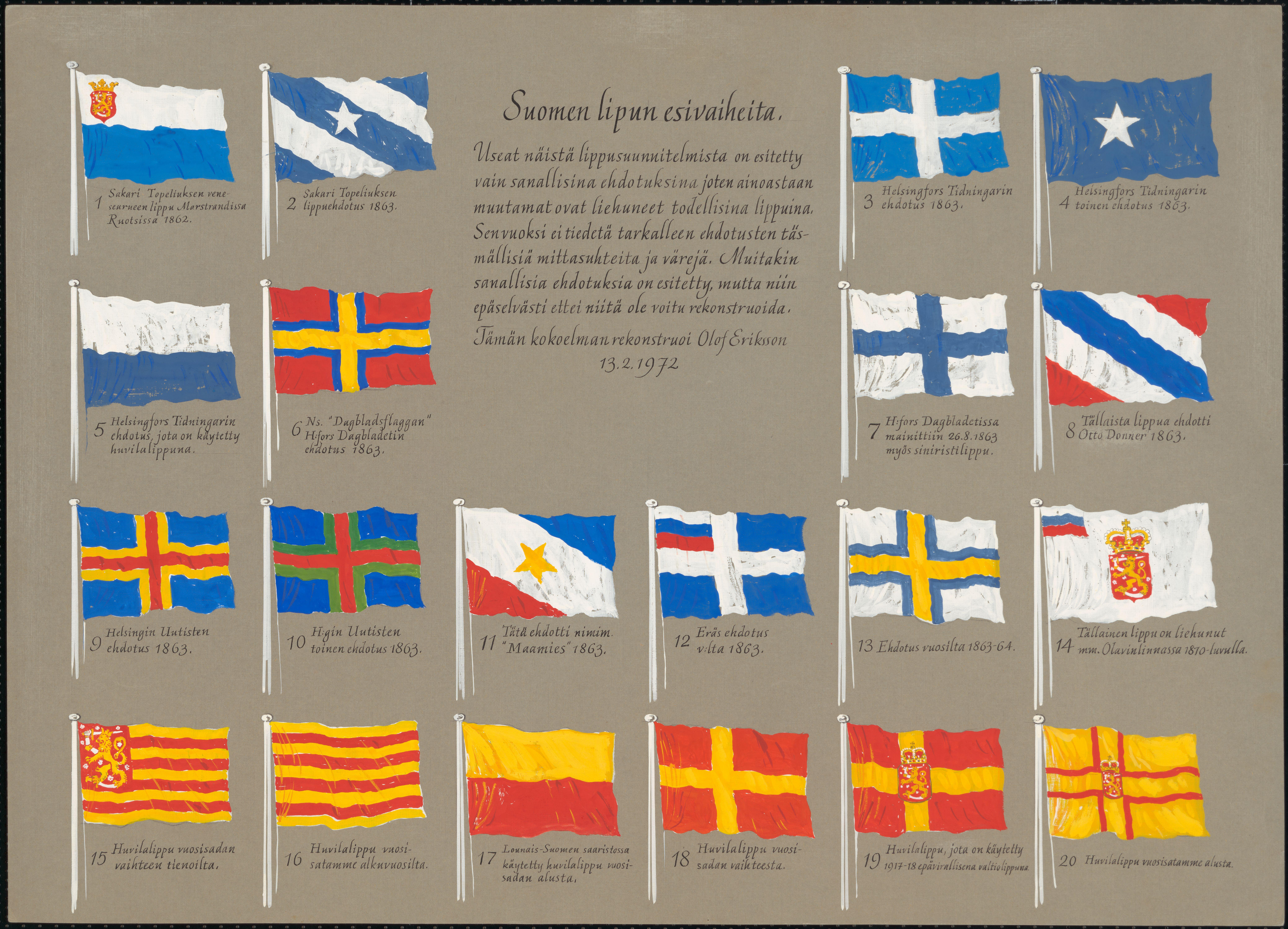
Proposed flags of Finland 1862–1918, compiled by Olof Eriksson.

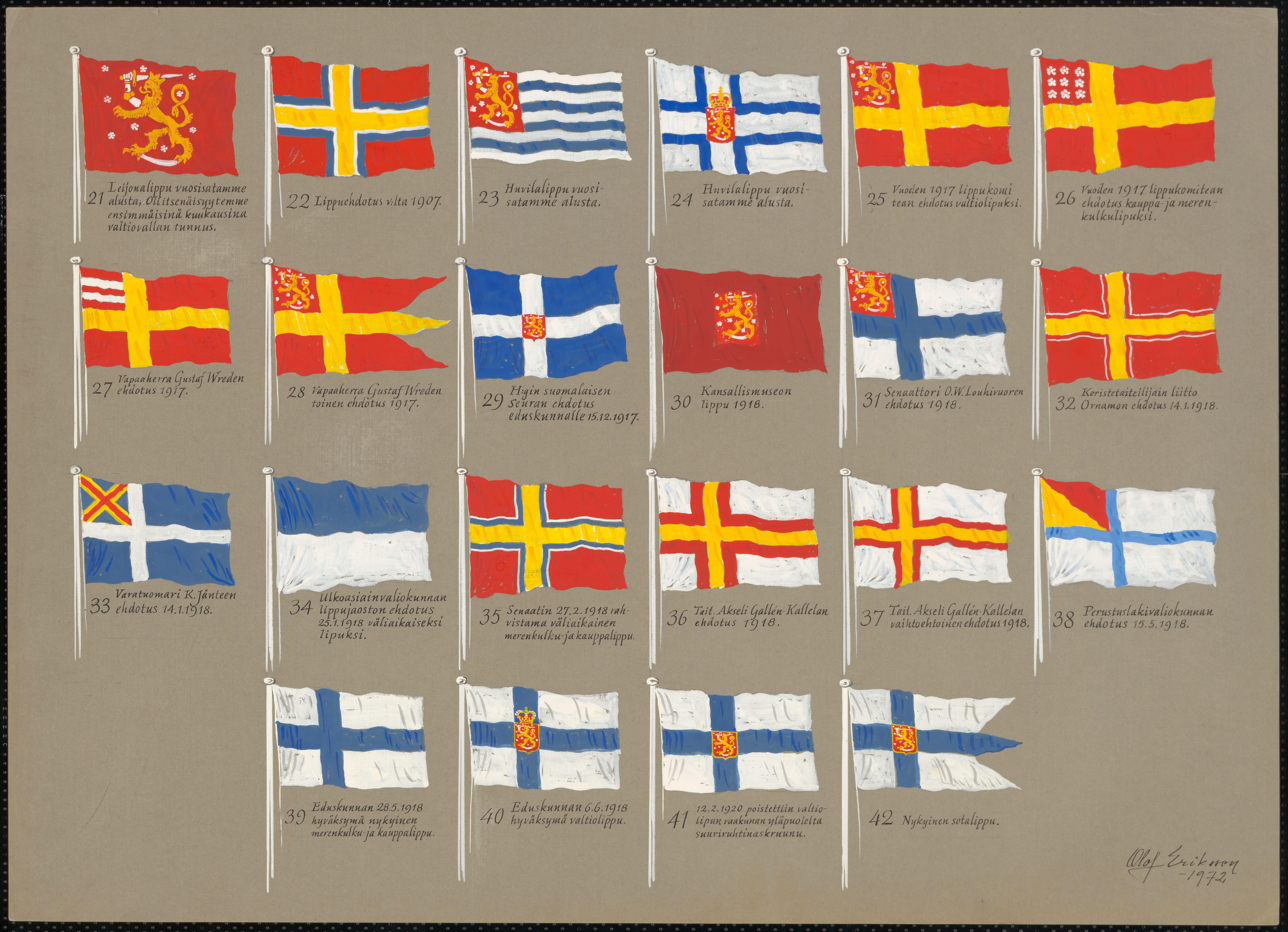
More proposed flags of Finland 1862–1918, compiled by Olof Eriksson.

== See also ==
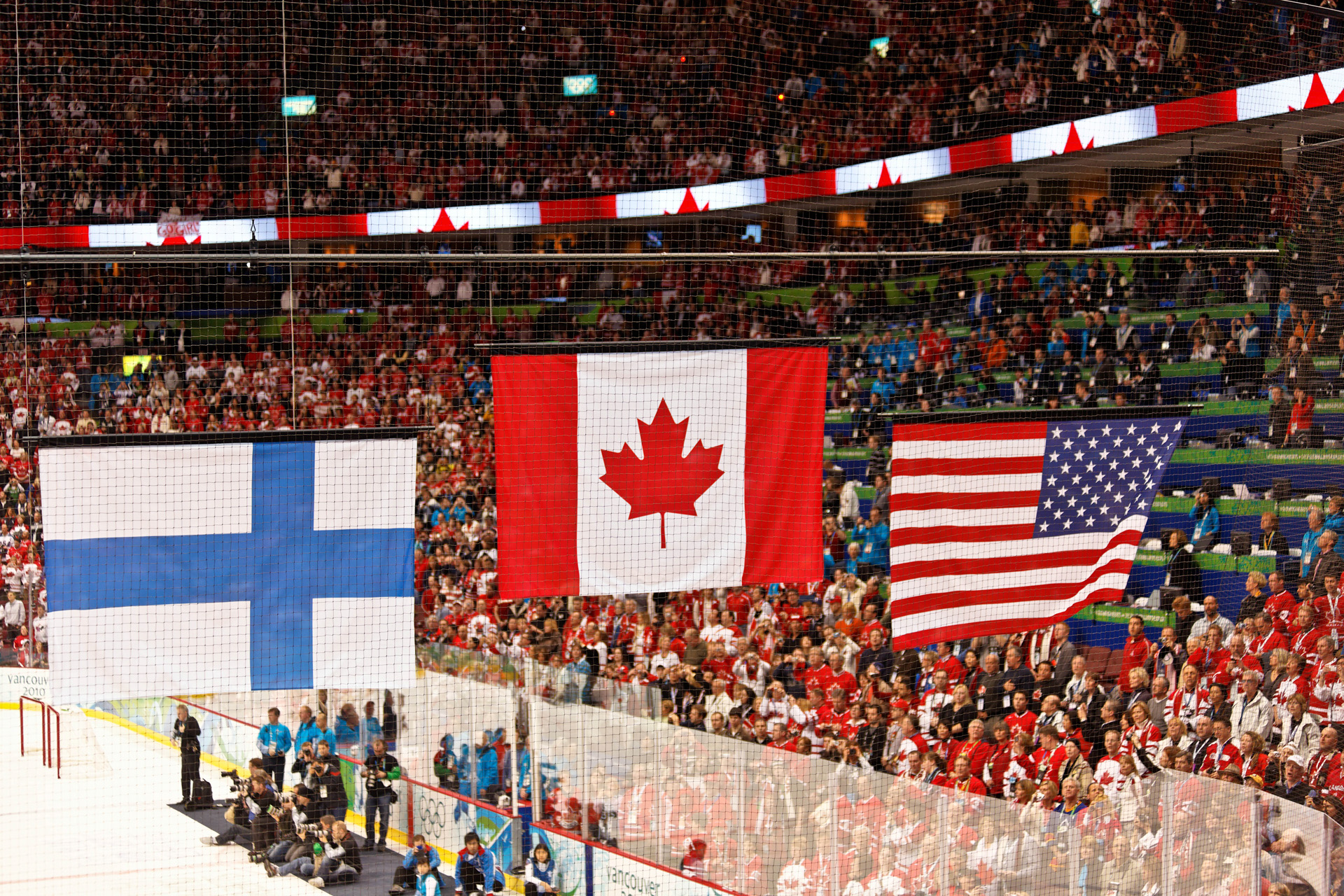
The Finnish flag at the medal ceremony for the women's ice hockey team at the 2010 Winter Olympics in Vancouver

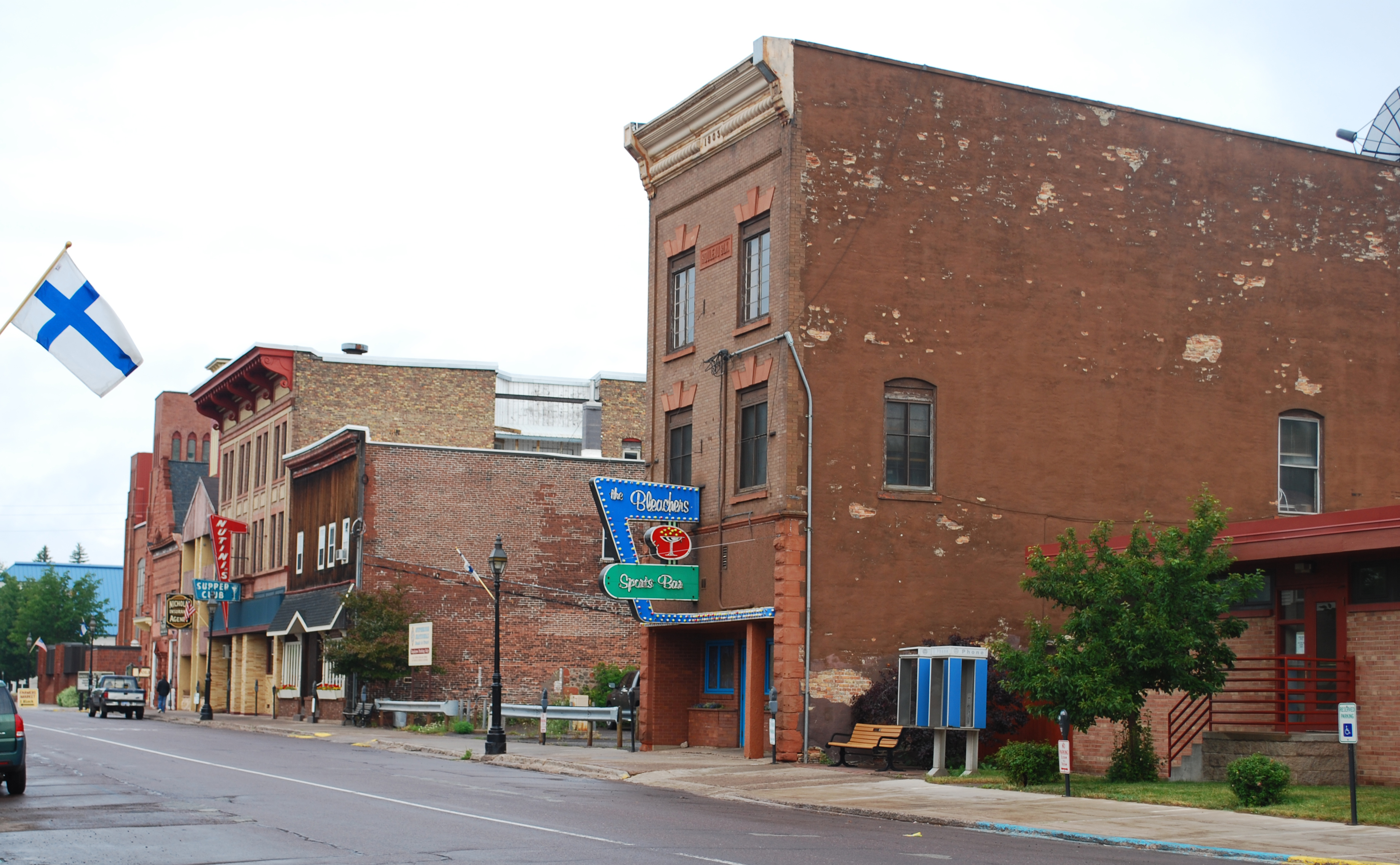
Finnish flag along Quincy Street in Hancock, Michigan

- List of flags of Finland
- 90th Anniversary of the Finnish Flag commemorative coin
- Nordic Cross flag
- Flag flying days in Finland
- Coat of arms of Finland
- Holidays in Finland
- National anthem of Finland
- Finnish national symbols
- Household pennants of Finland
- Raising the Flag on the Three-Country Cairn
