= Gamlakarleby Segelförening =

Finnish yacht club

- Emblem

- Burgee

- Burgee for motorboats

- Ensign
- Short name: GSF
- Founded: 27 February 1872; 153 years ago
- Location: Kokkola, Central Ostrobothnia
- Website: http://www.mustakari.fi

Gamlakarleby Segelförening (GSF) is a yacht club in Kokkola, Finland.

== History ==
GSF was established on 27 February 1872, becoming Finland's fourth oldest yacht club after Segelföreningen i Björneborg in Pori (1856), Nyländska Jaktklubben in Helsinki (1861) and Airisto Segelsällskap i Åbo in Turku. In 1908, the club moved to a club house at Mustakari and in 1912, the club joined the Finnish Sailing Federation.

The club hosted the 1975 Snipe World Junior Championship, won by the GSF sailors Heikki Haimakainen and Timo Karlsson, and the 1992 European Championship. During their 150 years jubilee, GSF organised the Hai Finnish Championship.
