= Household pennant =

Scandinavian symbol

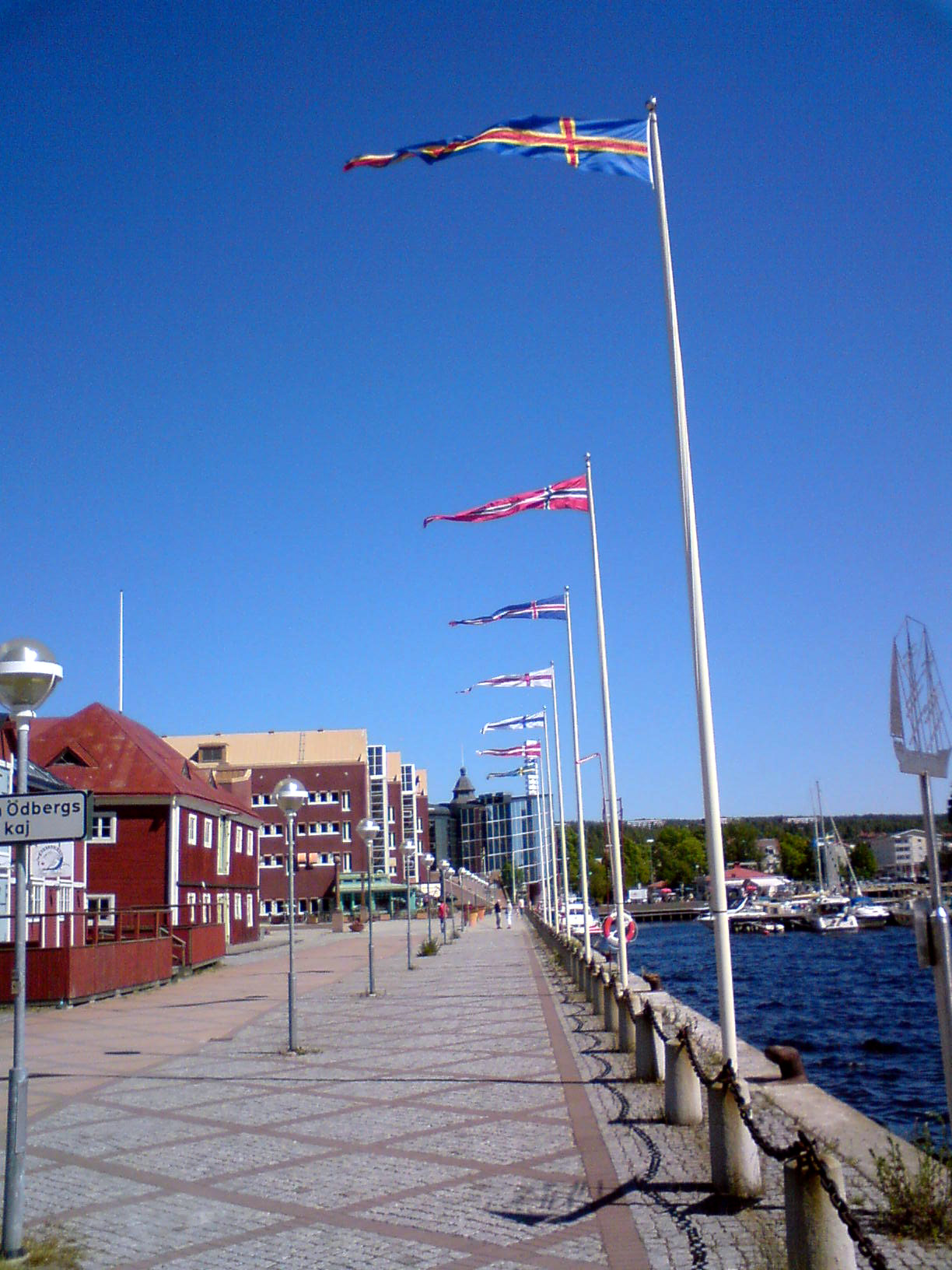
A collection of Nordic pennants in Örnsköldsvik. In order: Åland, Norway, Iceland, Faroe Islands, Finland, Denmark, and Sweden.

Household pennant is a relatively common Nordic and Scandinavian tradition. Household pennants (Finnish: isännänviiri; Swedish: (husbonds)vimpel; Norwegian: vimpel; Danish: vimpel) can be flown on days other than flag flying days and are traditionally a means of showing that the "master of the house" is at home; they may also be flown simply for decoration. Due to this, pennant flags are usually a more common sight than the national flag in these countries. These pennants have a long, narrow, triangular shape, usually one third to half the length of the flag pole. The pennants are also used in some countries for determining wind direction. Unlike the national flag, which usually has a specific timeframe it can formally be flown during the day, pennants are regarded as more informal, and can be flown all day and night until worn out.

== Denmark ==
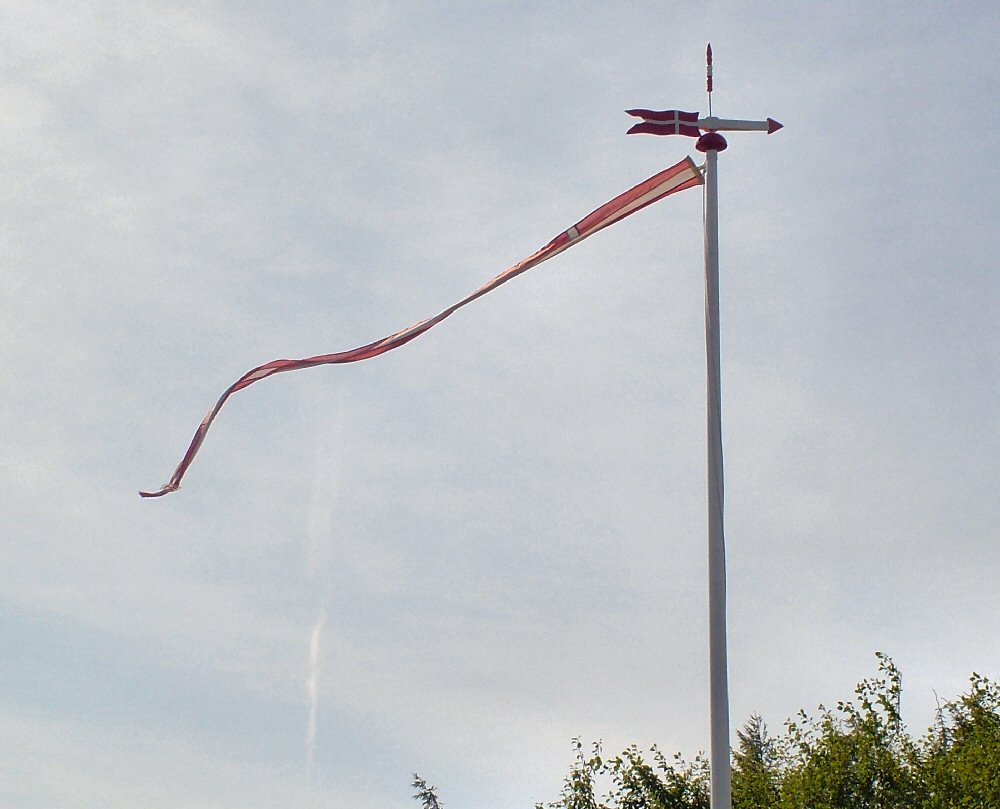
Danish pennant

Danish pennants retain the cross of the Dannebrog and are generally very long and thin. The pennants can be connected to the pole like a traditional flag, or via a single lanyard, giving the pennant the ability to rotate while flying.

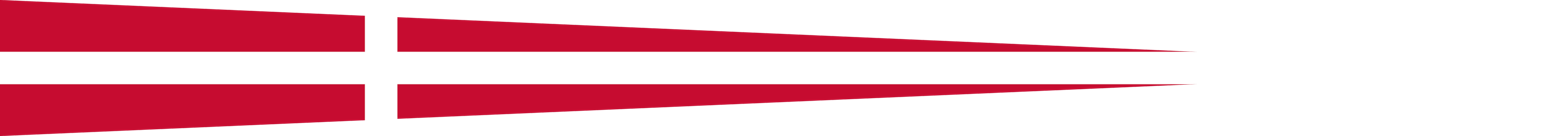
Denmark

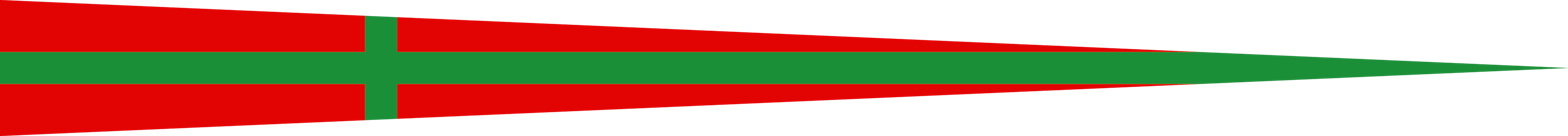
Bornholm

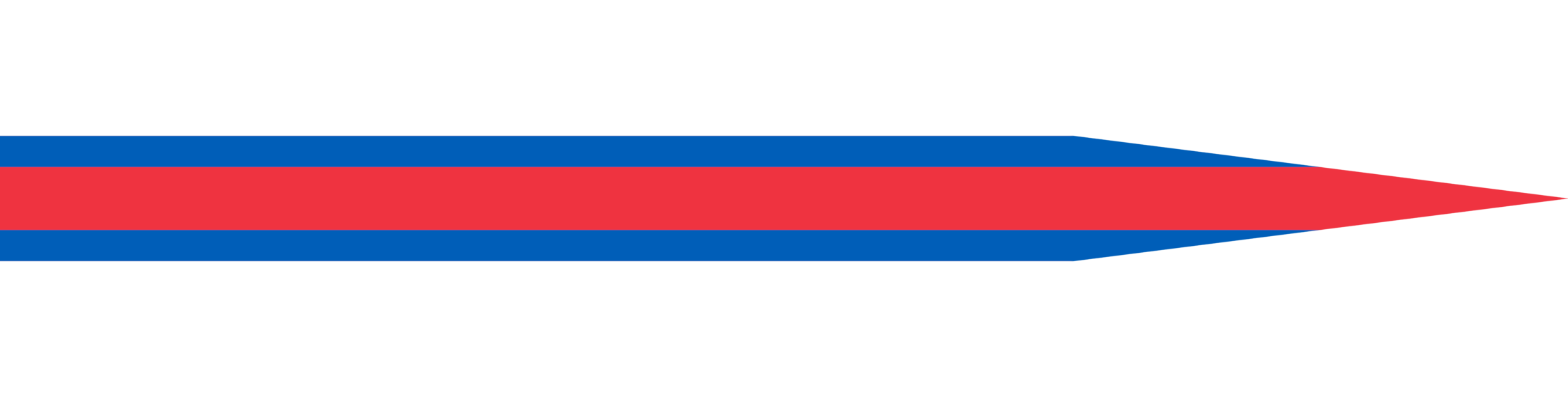
Faroe Islands

== Finland ==
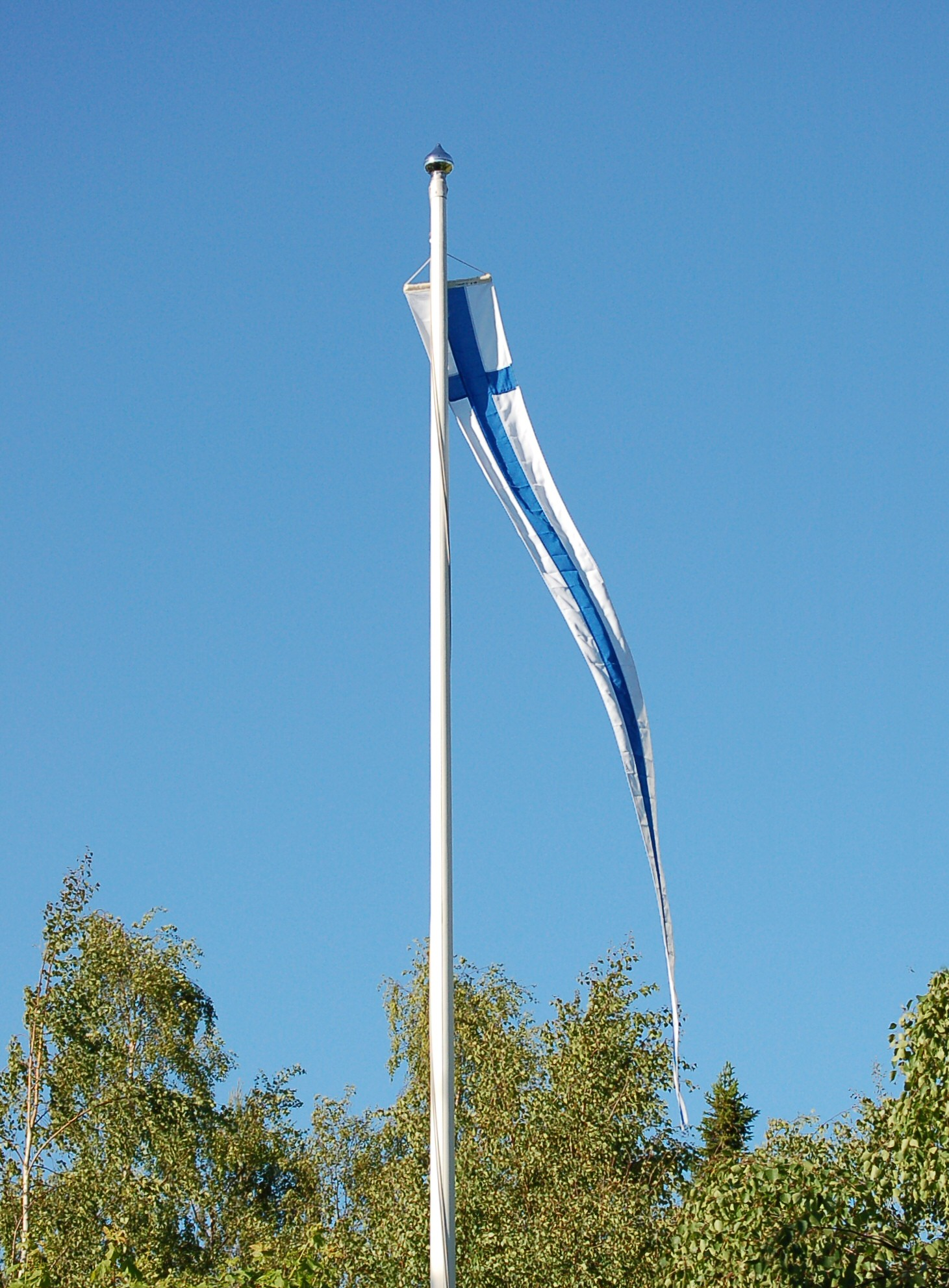
Finnish general pennant, blue-cross pennant

Finnish pennants retain the cross design of their national flag. The pennant's triangle has a base of roughly one tenth of the length and it is connected to the pole via a single lanyard, giving the pennant the ability to rotate while flying. The shapes, designs and uses of the pennants are however not regulated by law, as long as they do not interfere with uses of the regular flag, which is regulated. It is also allowed to fly a pennant overnight. In addition to the general pennant (which is based on the flag of Finland) and the regional variants, there are also family, city and municipality variants, of which any may be flown. A common practice is to either fly the pennant of the region of residence or the pennant from which the family members come.

Finland

Swedish-speaking Finns

=== Finnish regional pennants ===
The different regions of Finland have been connected with some traditional colors (often from the coats of arms of the historical provinces of Finland and modern provinces), and these are often reflected in the household pennant. The pennants sometimes also incorporate the regional arm into the design. A common practice is to either fly the pennant of the region of residence or the pennant from which the family members come. As the household pennant is connected to the pole with a single lanyard, the pennant has the ability to revolve around its horizontal axis. Thus, an actual pennant does not have a "top" side, making some of the pennants identical in practice.

Pennant of Åland

Pennant of Central Finland

Pennant of Central Ostrobothnia

Pennant of Kainuu

Pennant of Karelia

Pennant of Kymenlaakso

Pennant of Lapland

Pennant of Northern Ostrobothnia

Pennant of Satakunta

Pennant of Savonia

Pennant of South Karelia

Pennant of Southern Ostrobothnia

Pennant of Southwest Finland

Pennant of Swedish-speaking Ostrobothnia

Pennant of Tavastia

Pennant of Uusimaa

Pennant of Swedish-speaking Uusimaa/Nyland

=== The colors of the coat of arms ===
Pennant of South Karelia

Pennant of Kymenlaakso

Pennant of Pirkanmaa

Pennant of Ostrobothnia

Pennant of North Karelia

Pennant of Päijät-Häme

Pennant of Päijät-Häme (1983-1997)

Pennant of Southwest Finland

== Norway ==
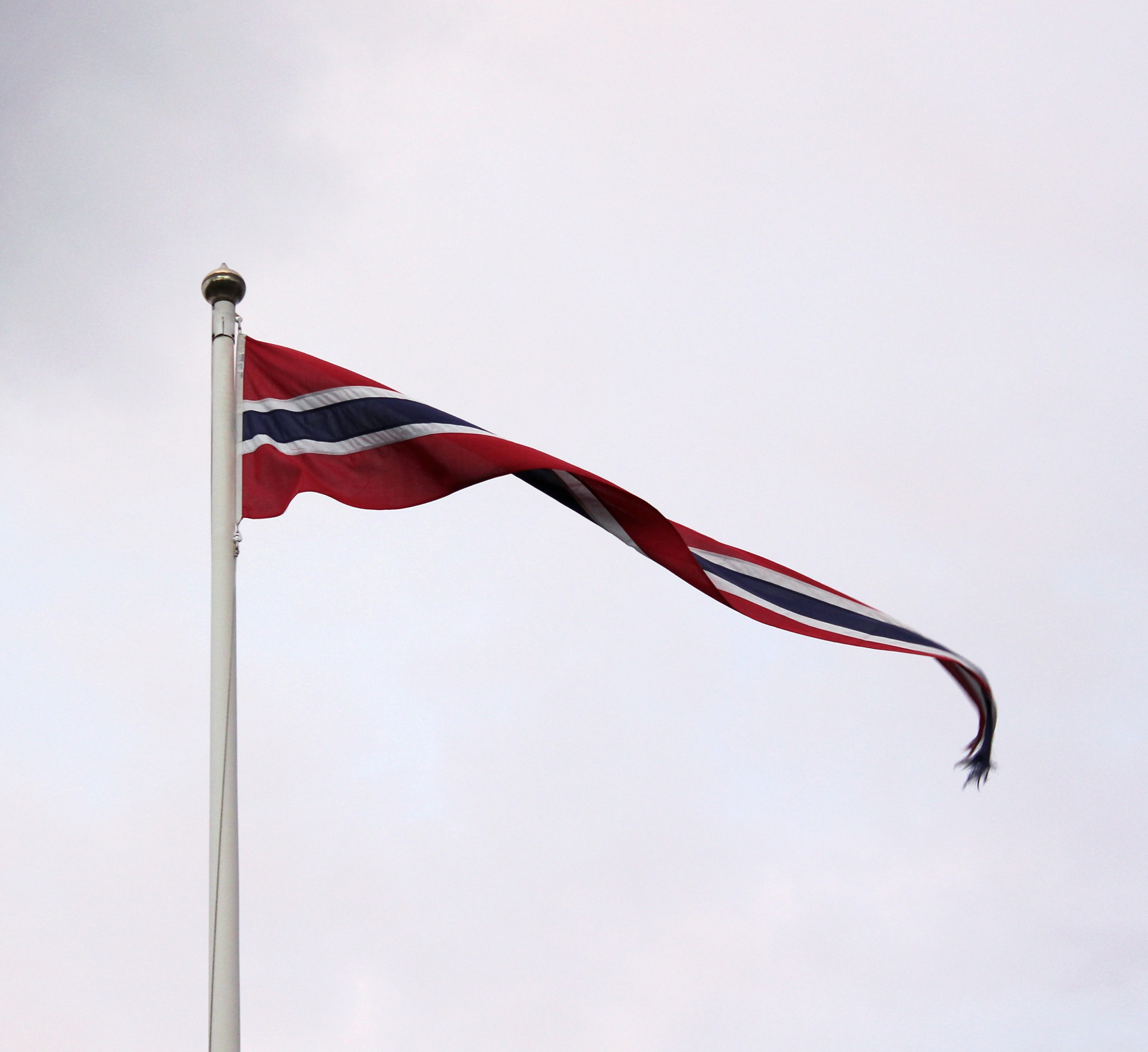
Norwegian pennant

Norwegian pennants do not contain the Nordic cross and instead uses a single stripe in blue with white borders on a red triangular canvas. Although they may sometimes appear different such as with the Nordic cross motif of the national flag, these alternative designs are very uncommon compared to the single stripe design. Municipal specific pennants are also sometimes used by certain national subdivisions as decorations. When pennants of other Nordic countries are flown in Norway alongside the Norwegian pennant, the design of the single stripe is carried over to the other Nordic pennants.

Norwegian Pennant

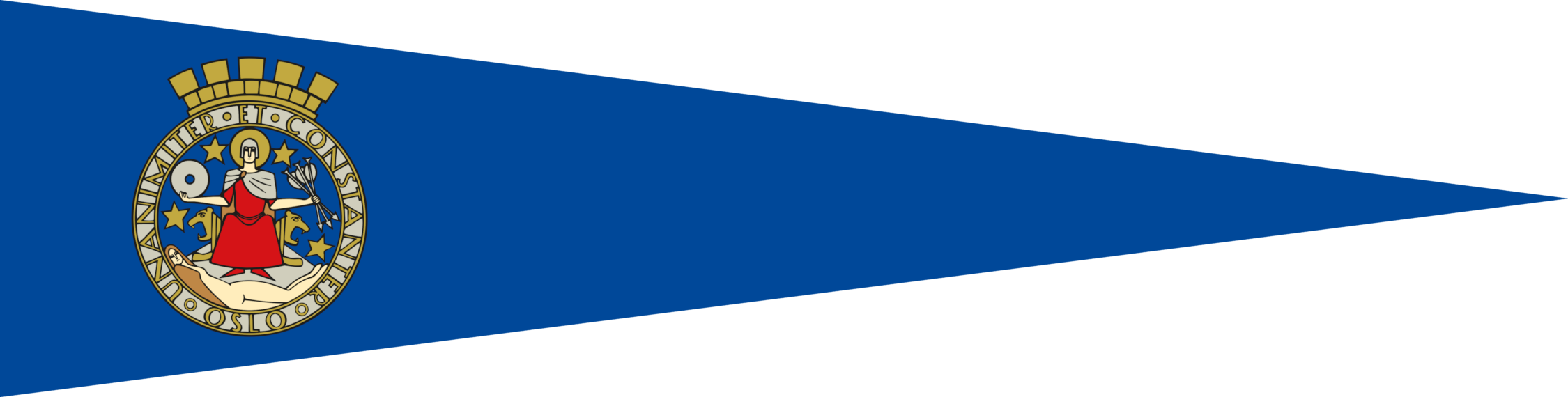
Oslo Pennant

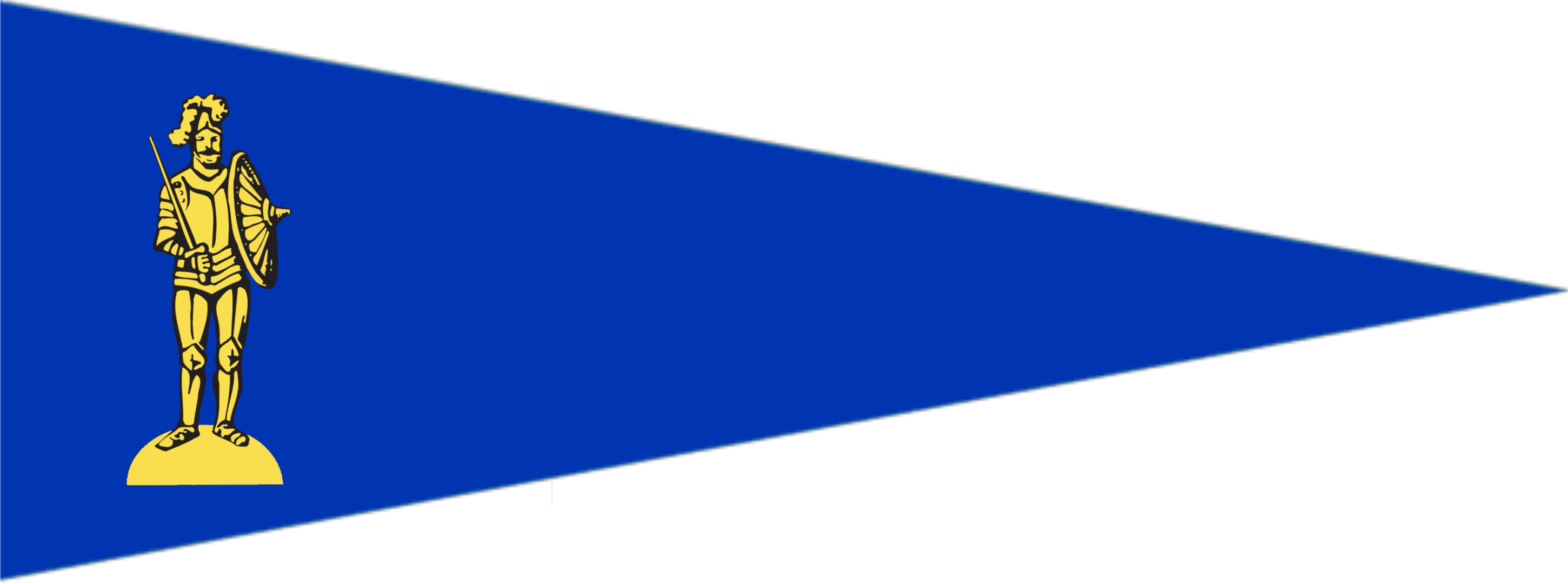
Halden Pennant

== Sweden ==
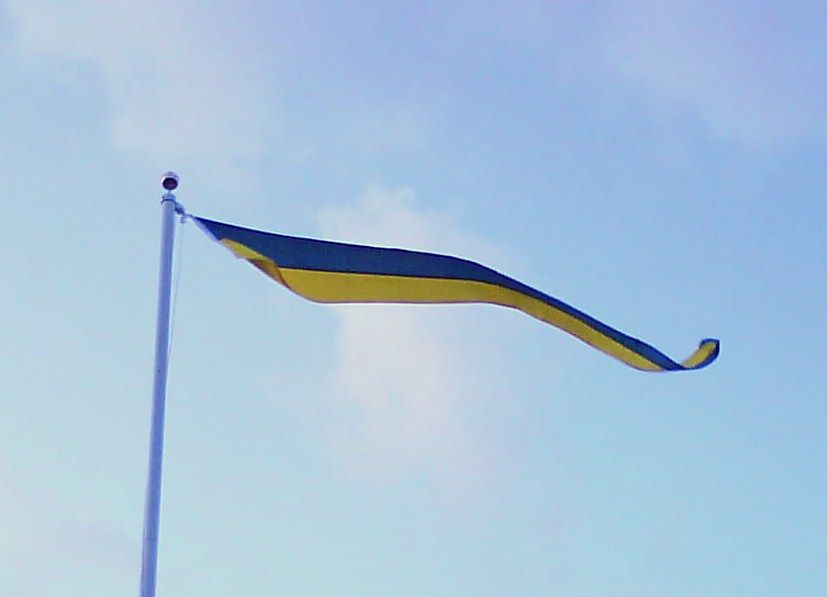
Swedish pennant

The design of Swedish pennants, unlike other Nordic pennants, are regulated. These pennants must be half blue and half yellow, with blue on top. Swedish pennants with cross designs are popular, but the National Archives of Sweden recommends not using them. The length of the pennant should be 1/3 of the flagpole. The colors are not defined, but should match those of the national flag.

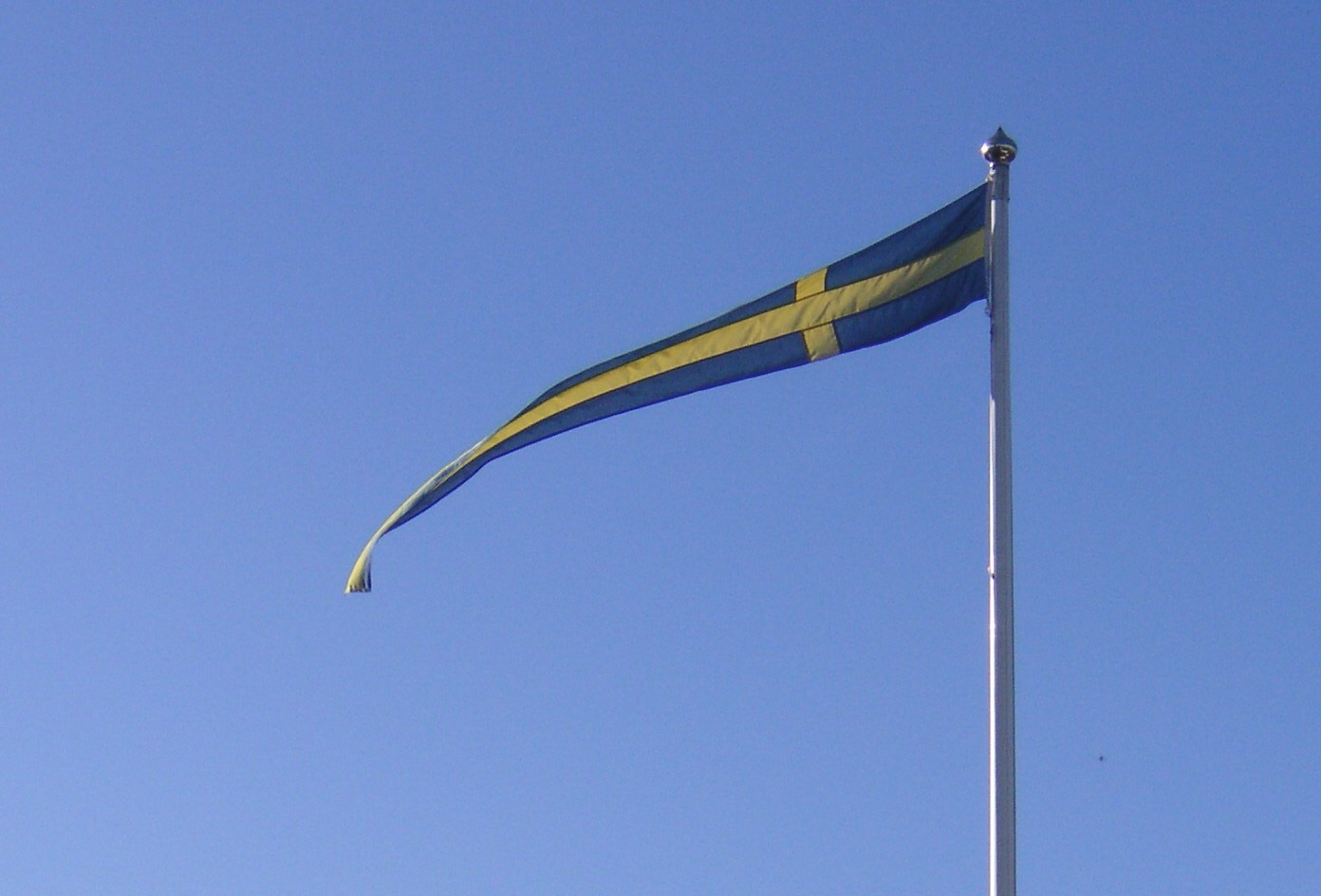
Variant of Swedish pennant, with cross

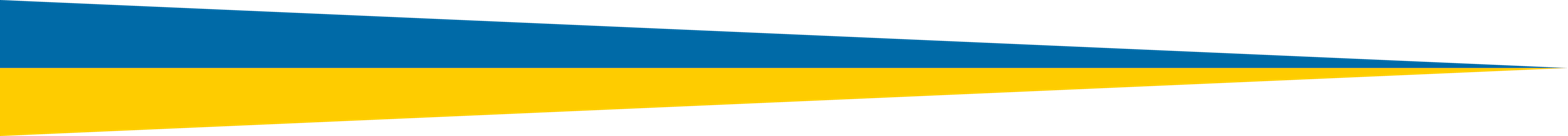
Sweden

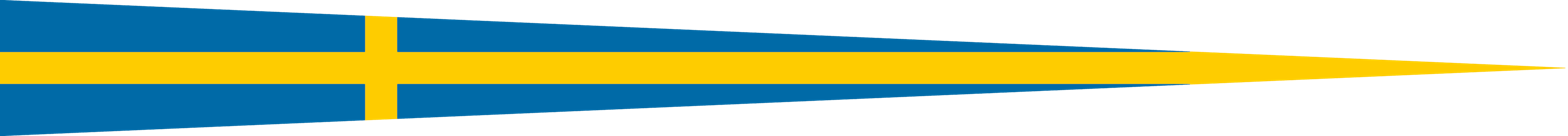
Sweden (with cross)

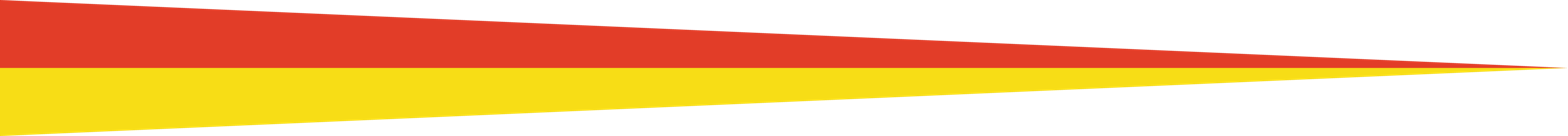
Scania

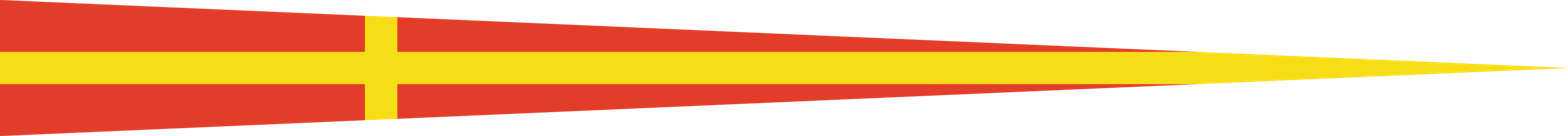
Scania (with cross)

== Other ==
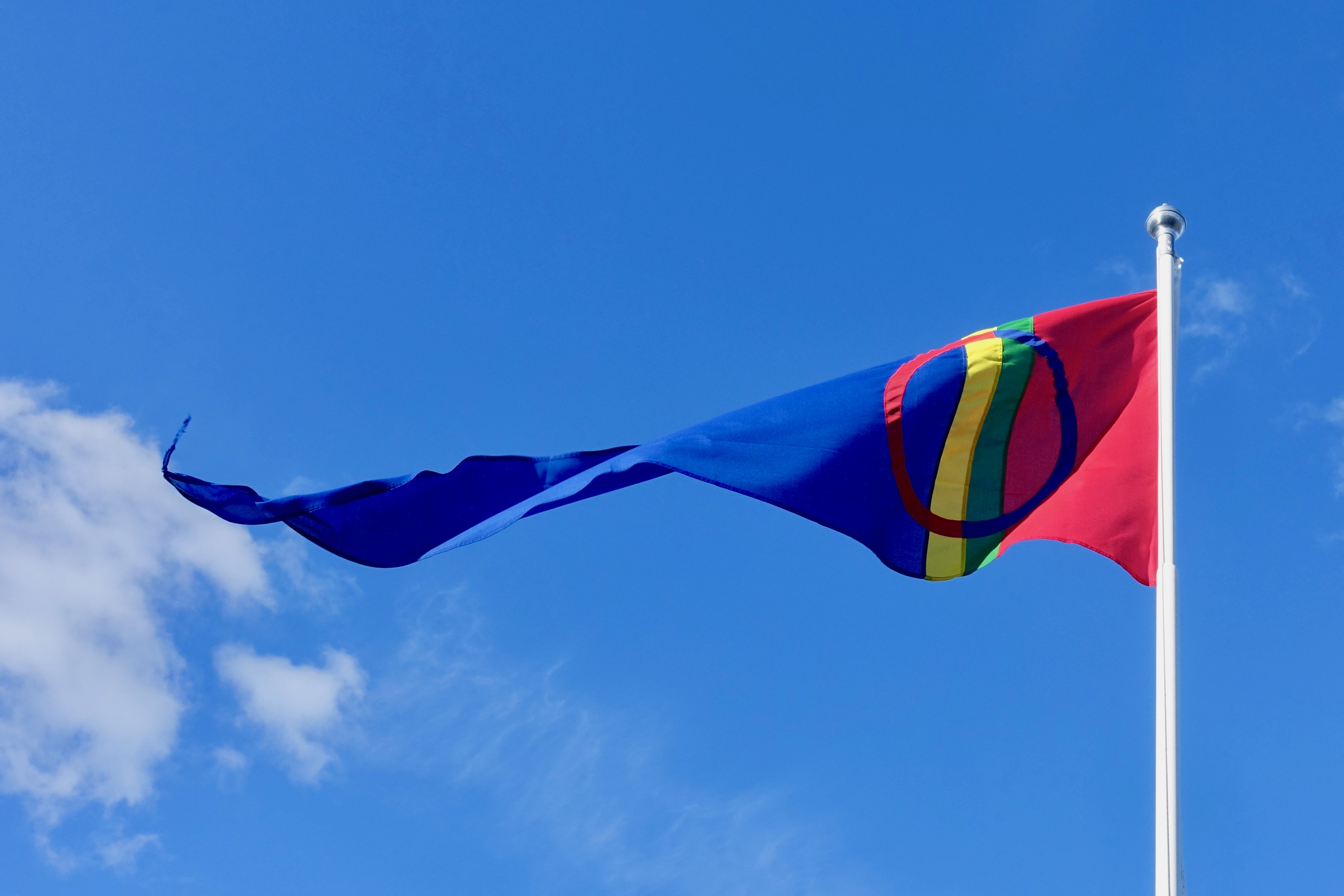
Sami pennant

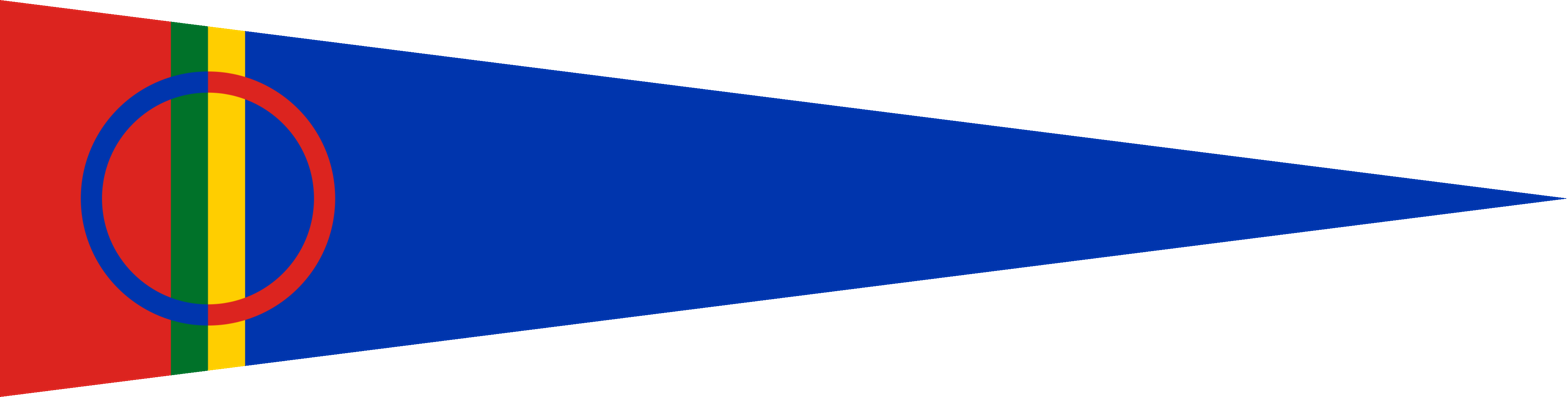
Sámi Pennant

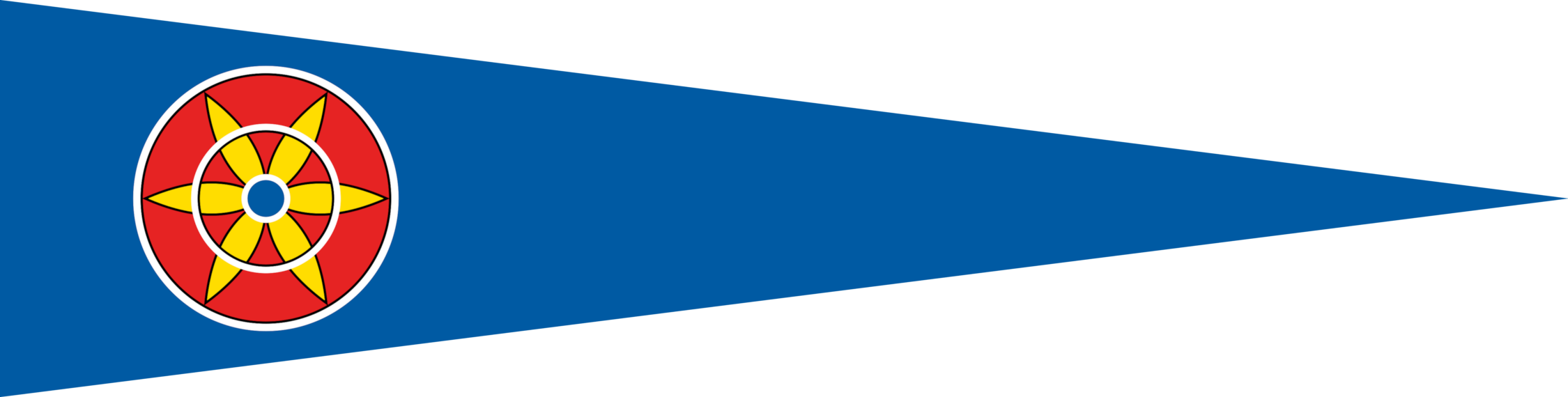
Kven Pennant

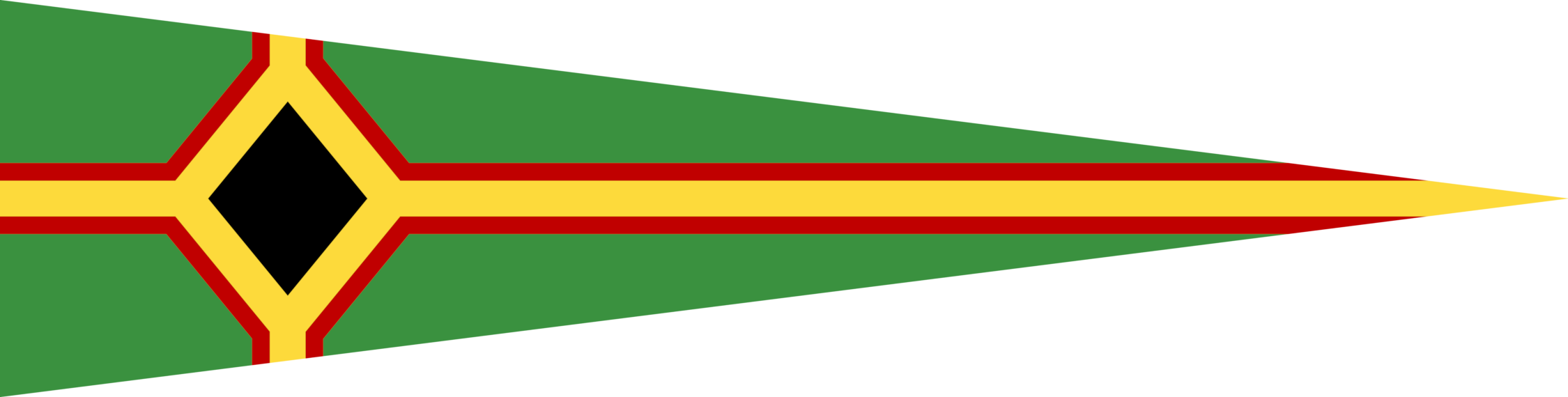
Forest Finn Pennant

== See also ==
- Flag flying days in Finland
- Flag flying days in Norway
- Flag flying days in Sweden
