= Nyländska Jaktklubben =

Finnish yacht club

- Emblem

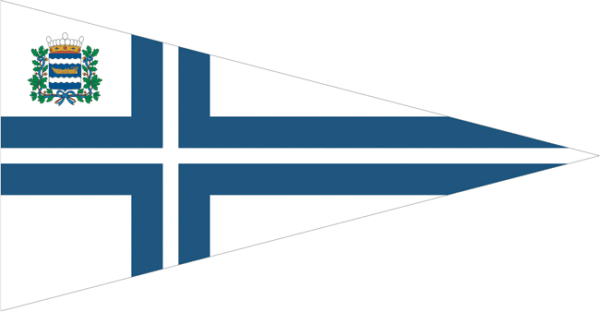
- Burgee of the NJK

- Burgee for motorboats

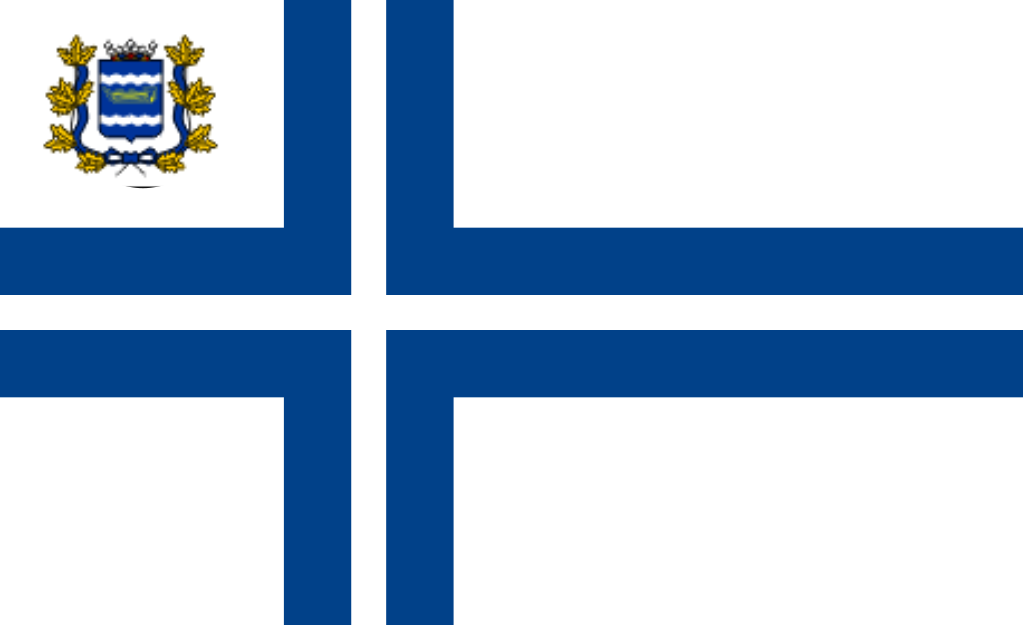
- Ensign of the NJK
- Short name: NJK
- Founded: March 4, 1861; 165 years ago
- Location: Helsinki, Finland
- Commodore: Mats Welin
- Website: http://www.njk.fi

Nyländska Jaktklubben (NJK; lit. 'Uusimaa Yacht Club') is a yacht club in Helsinki, Uusimaa, Finland.

== History ==
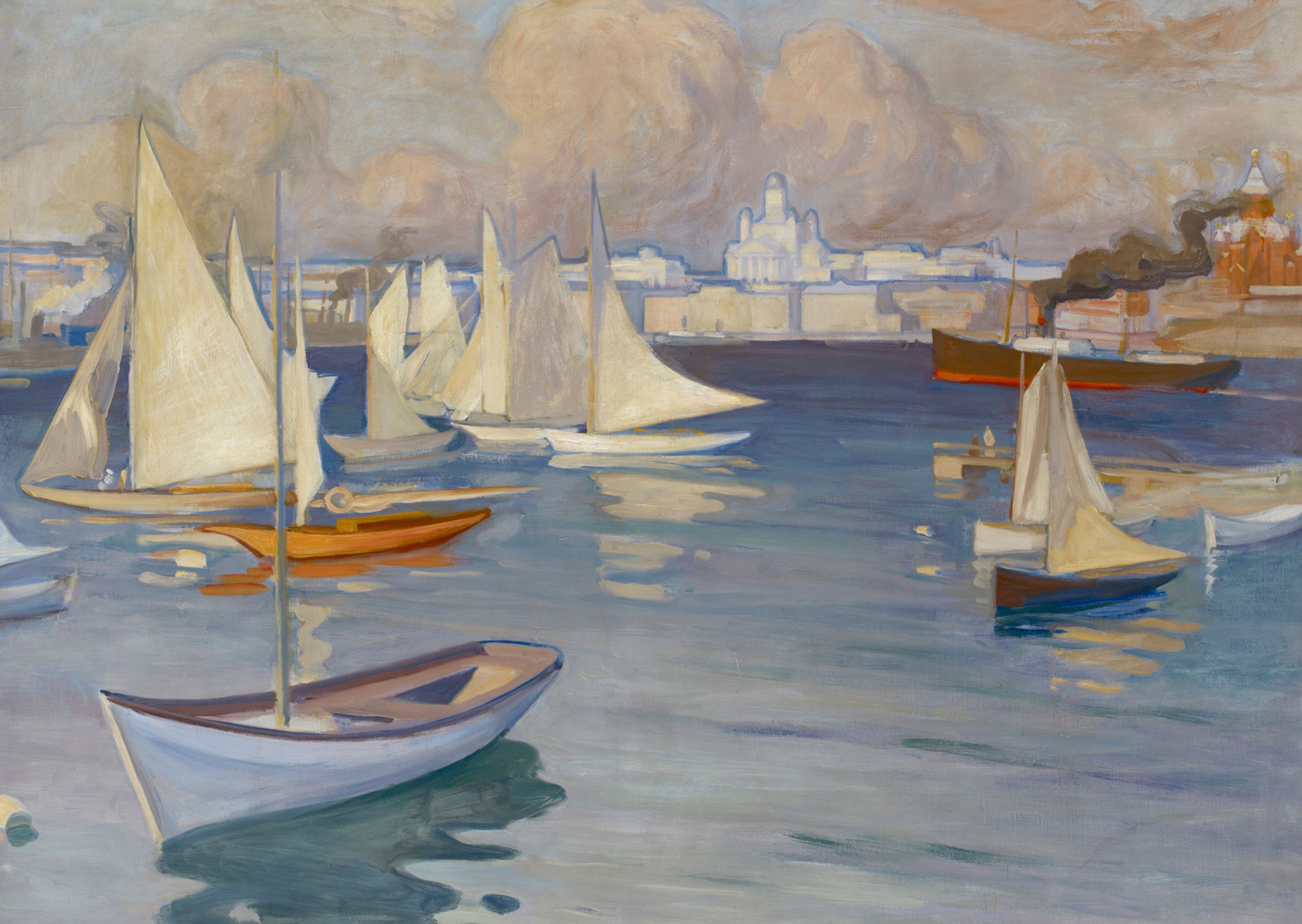
The Nyländska Jaktklubben Harbour in Helsinki, Albert Edelfelt, 1899

The club was founded on 4 March 1861, with the approval of its constitution by Tsar Alexander II. His brother, Admiral-General Grand Duke Konstantin, officiated at the inauguration ceremony. In the same year, NJK received its first yachting ensign, based on the flag of the Neva Yacht Club of St. Petersburg: white with a blue cross (similar to the flag of Finland), with the crest of the district of Nyland (Uusimaa) in the upper inner corner. Today's flag, introduced in 1919, is the fourth version of the original. The official language of the club is Swedish.

Nyländska Jaktklubben organised their first event on 15 August 1862 on Kruunuvuorenselkä. The first club house was opened 3 July 1881 on Vehkasaari, and lasted as the clubhouse until 1885, when they moved to Valkosaari. For the 25 year jubilee of the club in 1886, Club Commodore Nicolas Sinebrychoff donated a challenger trophy, the Sinebrychoff Trophy. The present pavilion, designed by architects Estlander and Settergren, was inaugurated in 1900.

The club members Bertil Tallberg and Ernst Krogius won medals at the 1912 Summer Olympics. In 1919, NJK statued the prize that would become the trophy of the Scandinavian Gold Cup.

In 1980, club member Georg Tallberg won a medal at the 1980 Summer Olympics.

In 2016, it was decided NJK would move from Koivusaari to Hernesaari.

== Harbours ==
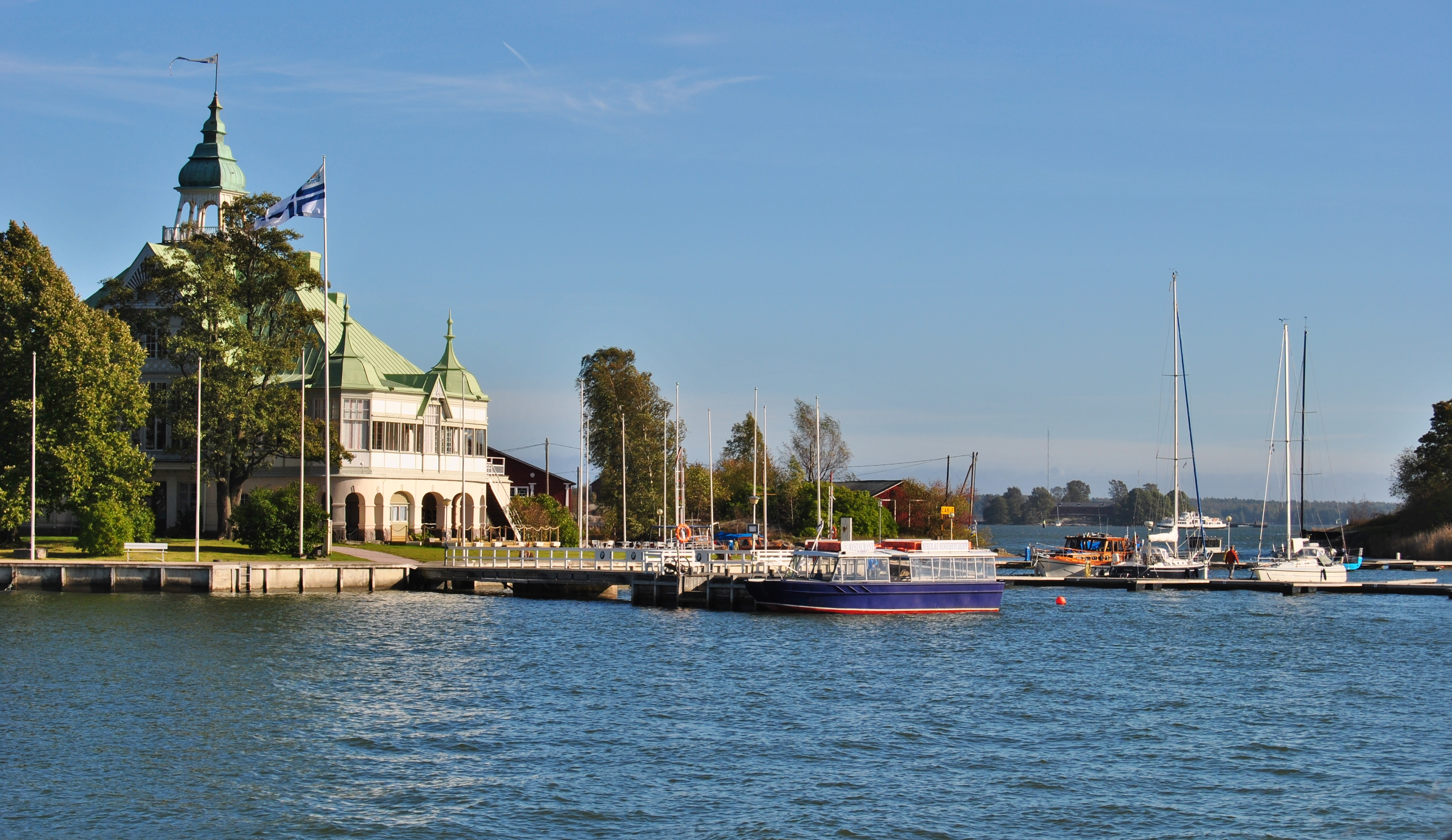
The Nyländska Jaktklubben clubhouse at Valkosaari

Today NJK has two home harbours, Valkosaari and Koivusaari:

- Valkosaari (Swedish: Blekholmen) is one of the official guest harbours of Helsinki, receiving around 400 visiting yachts every year. During the summer the club house accommodates a public restaurant, which is a member of the Finnish Royal Restaurants (Royal Ravintolat). Blekholmen offers its guests toilets (24/7), showers, sauna and laundry-room. Water, electricity and holding-tank emptying are also available.
- Koivusaari (Swedish: Björkholmen) is the NJK sailing centre. Situated on the western part of Lauttasaari with berths for 200 boats. Björkholmen is one of the busiest sailing centres in the capital region. The clubhouse, with the club office, is open all year round. It has a small café open for club members and kitchen and dining area for bigger occasions and events.

== Sailing center ==
NJK hosts one of the biggest sailing centers in Finland where you can sail without owning a boat. The Sailing Center has a total of 12 boats, 8 J/80 and 4 606. NJK Sailing Center organizes beginner sailing courses, weekly training on different levels and competitions.

== See also ==
- List of International Council of Yacht Clubs members
