= Flag of Scania =

Provincial flag

Scania
- Design: The official flag of Scania (Skåne in Swedish), not used as much as the cross flag.
- Scanian Cross Flag
- Use: Other
- Proportion: 14:17
- Design: Red background with yellow cross. Proportions 3-1-3 in height and 3-1-4.5 in length. International colour code: Red=PMS 179 Yellow=108

Flag of Scania (Swedish: Skånes flagga) refers to two different flags, of which one is a banner of the provincial coat of arms featuring a griffin head, and the other is a flag with a Scandinavian cross, the Scanian Cross Flag. They both are used as a provincial flag representing Scania (Swedish: Skåne), the southernmost province of Sweden.

The cross flag is used by the Region when the council is in session, alongside the Swedish national flag, the European Union flag and the council's own banner, so it's officially used. The traditional province of Scania also has arms bearing a red griffin head in a golden field, and the official flag of the province is thus a banner of arms based on this arms. (But is next to never used as a flag) The modern provincial authorities also use banners-of-arms, one being the banner-of-arms of Scanian Regional Council (i.e. the county council), adopted 9 February 1999: on a field of blue, a yellow crowned griffin head issuing from the bottom edge. County of Scania, Skåne län, also has an official flag consisting of the banner of arms: on a field of yellow, a red griffin head, crowned blue.

== Proportions ==
The Scanian cross flag has no firm rules related to its mathematical relationships, with the major exceptions, that it has to resemble either the Danish Dannebrog or the Flag of Sweden, or somewhere in between these two flags. For instance, to base the Scanian flag on the Flag of Finland or the English Saint George's Cross by changing the colours are both considered wrong, as the Cross on the Finnish flag is too wide and the English one has a different, symmetrical, cross.

== History ==
The banner with the griffin head derives from the coat of arms, given to the province by the king of Sweden in the 1600s. It is the flag version of the coat.

A disputed hypothesis claims that the cross flag is derived from the coat of arms of the Danish Archbishop of Lund. and would thereby be older than the banner with the griffin head.

The modern Scanian cross flag was for a long period believed to have been created in the 1870s at the private initiative of the historical professor Martin Weibull. But this was later denied by his son, Curt Weibull, who instead gave this credit to his uncle, Mathias Weibull, who also was a historical professor. Curt Weibull also stated that the modern flag was created first in 1902. His design is based on the Nordic tradition of cross flags. It combines the red field of the flag of Denmark with the yellow cross of the flag of Sweden, reflecting the troubled history of the region.

The Swedish broadcaster SVT, in their regional news for Scania, aired on Tuesday 26 September 2017 the news, the chairman of Region Scania, the Social Democrat Henrik Fritzon, wanted to make the flag of Scania official within the region, as it is "locally well-liked".

While the banner only represents Scania, some has proposed that the cross flag should also represent the entire Skåneland, which is not just Scania but also Blekinge and Halland, where the flag is rarely seen.

== See also ==
- Flag of the Kalmar Union
- Flag of the Swedish-speaking Finns
