= Fritzon =

Fritzon is a surname. Notable people with the surname include:

- Anna-Lena Fritzon (born 1965), Swedish skier
- Heléne Fritzon (born 1960), Swedish politician
- Henrik Fritzon (born 1972), Swedish politician
