= Civil flag =

Flag that is flown by civilians on nongovernmental installations or craft

A civil flag is a version of a flag, usually a national flag that is flown by civilians on non-governmental installations or craft. The use of distinct civil flags was more common in the past to denote buildings or ships not crewed by the military.

In some countries, the civil flag is the same as the state flag but without the coat of arms or national emblem, such as in the case of the flags of Peru or Serbia. In others, it is an alteration of the war flag.

In Scandinavia, state and war flags can be double and triple-tailed variants of the Nordic cross flag. Many countries, particularly those with a British heritage, still have distinctive civil flags (technically civil ensigns) for use at sea, many based on the Red Ensign.
