= Nordic cross flag =

Flag bearing the design of the Nordic or Scandinavian cross

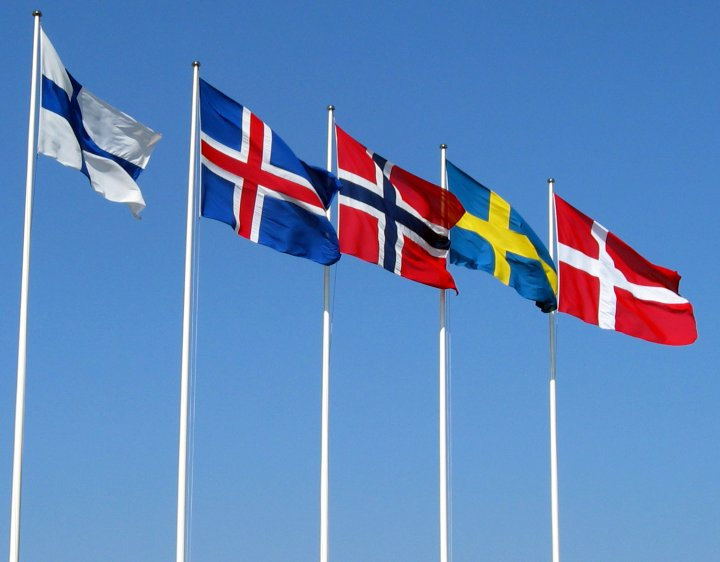
Nordic flags, from left to right: Finland, Iceland, Norway, Sweden and Denmark.

A selection of various Nordic Cross flags used in Northern Europe Larger flags, from left to right: Iceland, Faroe Islands, Denmark, Norway, Sweden, Finland; Smaller flags, from left to right: Barra, South Uist, Yorkshire West Riding (historical), Orkney, Shetland, Scania, Åland, Pärnu, Setomaa (ethnic), Vepsians (ethnic).

A Nordic cross flag is a flag bearing the design of the Nordic or Scandinavian cross, a cross symbol in a rectangular field, with the centre of the cross shifted towards the hoist.

All independent Nordic countries have adopted such flags in the modern period, and while the Nordic cross is named for its use in the national flags of the Nordic nations, the term is used universally by vexillologists, in reference not only to the flags of the Nordic countries but to other flags with similar designs. The cross design represents Christianity, and was first seen in the Dannebrog, the national flag of Denmark in the first half of the 13th century. The same design, but with a red Nordic cross on a yellow background, was used as union flag during the Kalmar union (1397 to 1523), and when that union fell apart in 1523 the same design, but with a yellow cross on a blue background (derived from the Swedish coat of arms adopted in 1442), was adopted as national flag of Sweden, while Norway adopted its flag in 1821. After gaining independence the other Nordic countries adopted national flags of the same design, Iceland in 1915 and Finland in 1918. The Norwegian flag was the first Nordic cross flag with three colours.

== Flag formats ==
Bicolor Nordic / Scandinavian cross

Tricolor Nordic / Scandinavian cross

Bicolor Swallowtail Nordic / Scandinavian cross

Tricolor Swallowtail Nordic / Scandinavian cross

Bicolor Swallowtail Double-pointed Nordic / Scandinavian cross

Tricolor Swallowtail Double-pointed Nordic / Scandinavian cross

== Flags of the Nordic countries ==
Some of these flags are historical. Also, flag proportions may vary between the different flags and sometimes even between different versions of the same flag.

The Flag of Greenland is the only national flag of a Nordic country or territory without a Nordic Cross. When Greenland was granted home rule, the present flag — with a graphic design unique to Greenland — was adopted in June 1985, supported by fourteen votes against eleven who supported a proposed green-and-white Nordic cross.

Flag of Denmark

Flag of Finland

Flag of Iceland

Flag of Norway

Flag of Sweden

=== Denmark ===
Flag of Denmark (1748)

State flag of Denmark (17th century)

Naval ensign of Denmark (17th century). Note the darker kraprød colour (1939).

Royal standard of Denmark

Standard of Mary, Queen of Denmark

Standard of Christian, Crown Prince of Denmark

Standard of the Regent of Denmark

Standard of the royal house- used by other members of the royal family

Flag of the Faroe Islands (1919)

=== Finland ===
Flag of Finland (1918)

State flag of Finland (1918)

War flag and naval ensign of Finland (1918)

Flag of the president of Finland, with the Cross of Liberty in the canton (1978)

Finnish yacht club ensign. Ratified club emblem in the canton (1919)

Flag of Åland (1954)

=== Iceland ===
Flag of Iceland (1944–present)

State flag of Iceland

Flag of the president of Iceland

Flag of the Icelandic Directorate of Customs

=== Norway ===
Flag of Norway (1821–1844 and 1899–present)

Naval ensign of Norway since 1905, civilian state flag since 1899.

Former flag of Norway (1814–1821).

The common naval ensign and war flag of Sweden and Norway from 1815 to 1844.

Merchant flag of Norway (1844–1898 with the union badge representing the union with Sweden)

Naval ensign and state flag of Norway (1844–1905)

=== Sweden ===
Flag of Sweden (1906–present)

Flag of Sweden before 1815

Flag of Sweden (1815–1844) representing the union with Norway

Flag of Sweden (1844–1905) representing the union with Norway

Naval ensign of Sweden

Royal standard of Sweden with the Greater coat of arms, used by the King and Queen of Sweden

Royal standard of Sweden with the lesser coat of arms, used by princes and princesses of Sweden

=== Kalmar Union (historical) ===
This is the historical flag of the Kalmar Union, which united Denmark, Sweden and Norway from 1397 to 1523. No pictorial evidence survives of the Kalmar Union's Flag. The flag appearing here is a reconstruction based on references in 1430 letters by King Eric of Pomerania.

== Regional Nordic flags ==
Most of these flags either do not have full official status or represent various private entities. Apart from the flags of Scania and Trøndelag, they have not been officially adopted and their use remains limited. Also, there is a flag of West Jutland for sale, but which not found at Wikimedia Commons.

Unofficial flag of the Swedish region of Bergslagen

Unofficial flag of the Swedish province of Bohuslän

Unofficial flag of the Danish region of Bornholm

Unofficial flag of the Swedish province of Gotland

Unofficial flag of the Swedish province of Hälsingland

Unofficial flag of the Swedish province of Härjedalen

Proposal for flag of Jutland

Unofficial flag of Norrland, the northernmost land of Sweden

Unofficial flag of the Swedish region of Roslagen

Official flag of the Swedish province of Scania and unofficial flag of Skåneland

Unofficial flag of the Swedish province of Småland

Official flag of the Norwegian county of Trøndelag

Unofficial Flag of Vendsyssel, Denmark

Unofficial flag of Västergötland (or West Sweden in general)

Unofficial flag of the Swedish province of Öland

Unofficial flag of the Swedish province of Östergötland

Unofficial flag of Swedish region of Österlen

== Nordic cross flags outside the Nordic countries ==
=== Armenia ===
Flag of Ejmiatsin

=== Brazil ===
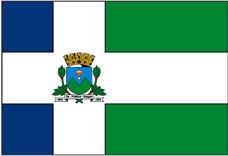
Flag of Areias, São Paulo State

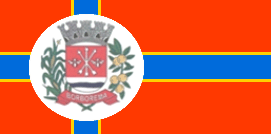
Flag of Borborema, São Paulo State

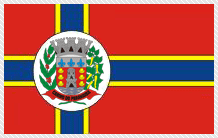
Flag of Carmo do Paranaíba, Minas Gerais

Flag of Chapadinha, Maranhão

Flag of Colorado, Rio Grande do Sul

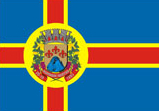
Flag of Domingos Martins, Espírito Santo

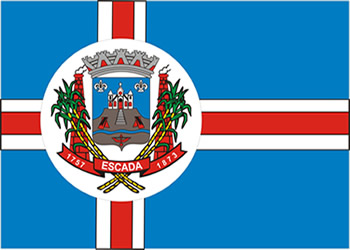
Flag of Escada, Pernambuco

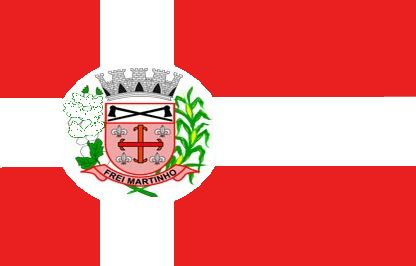
Flag of Frei Martinho, Paraíba

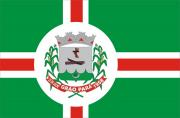
Flag of Grão Pará, Santa Catarina

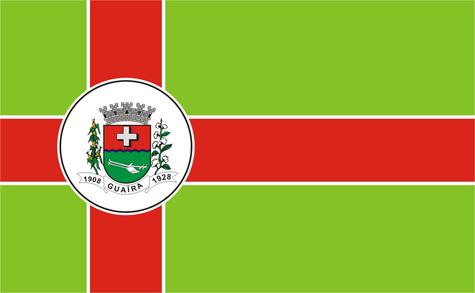
Flag of Guaíra, São Paulo State

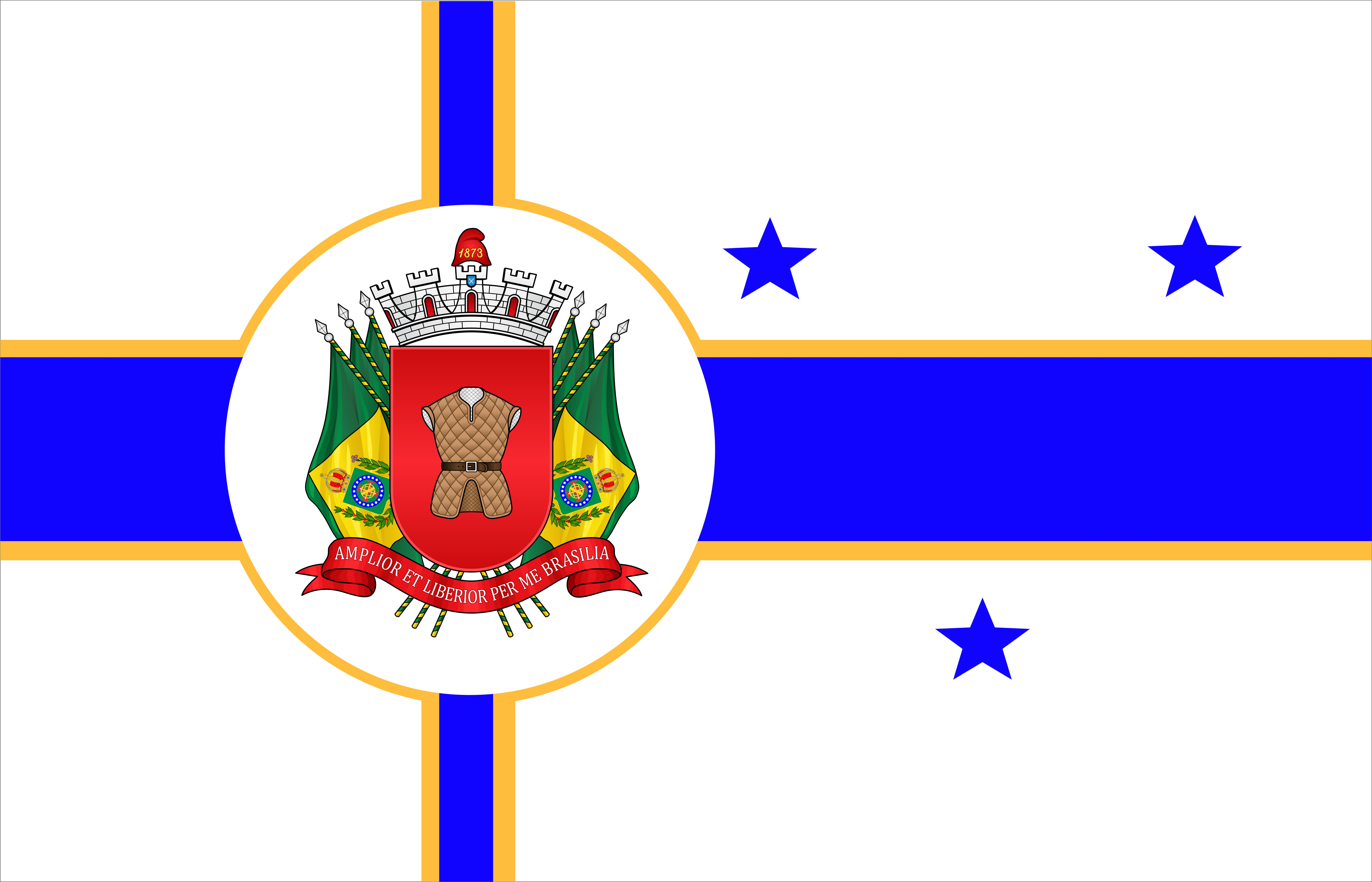
Flag of Itu, São Paulo State

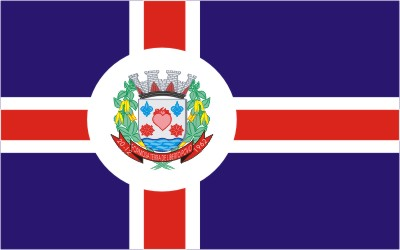
Flag of Lagoa Formosa, Minas Gerais

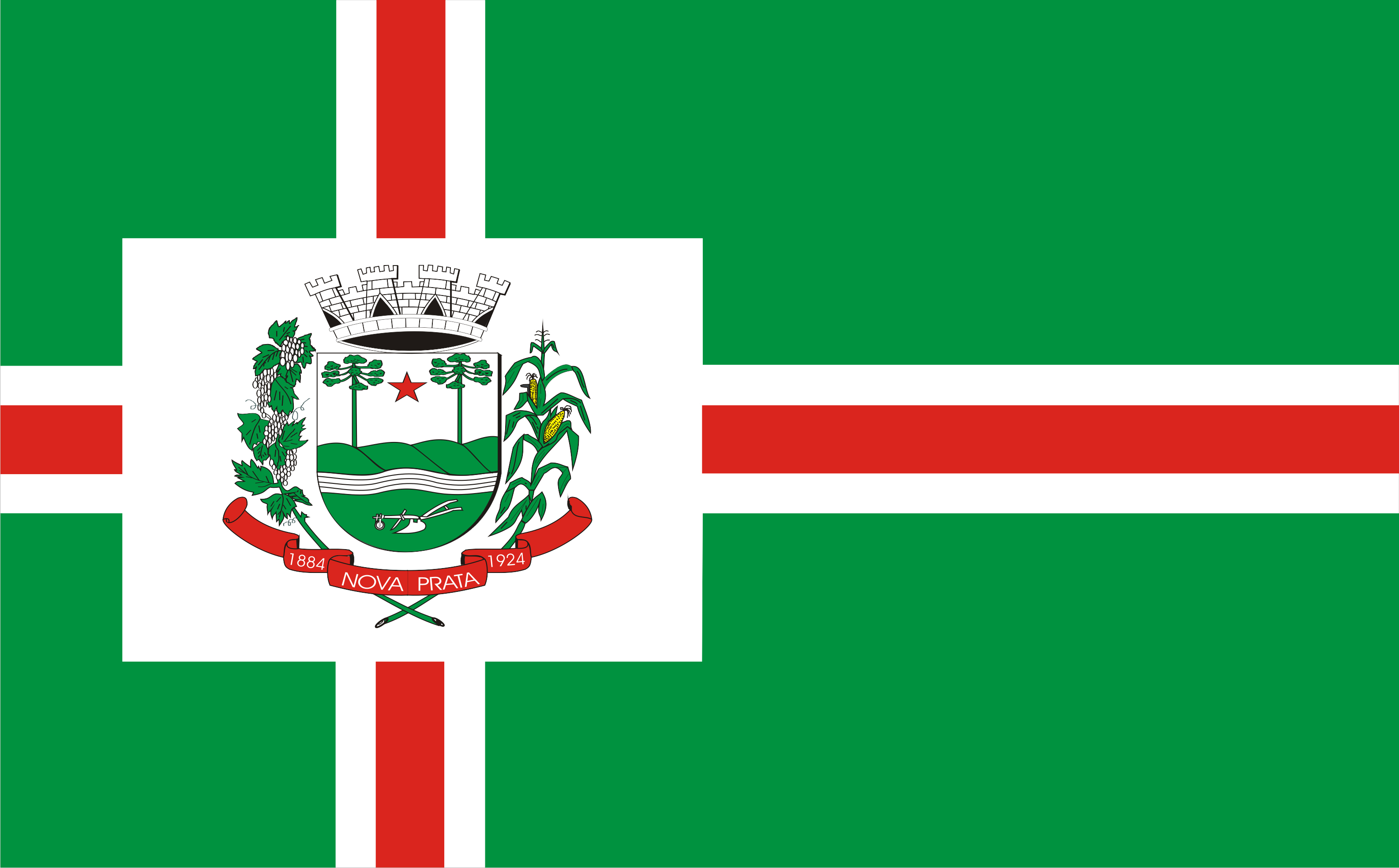
Flag of Nova Prata, Rio Grande do Sul

Flag of Palotina, Paraná

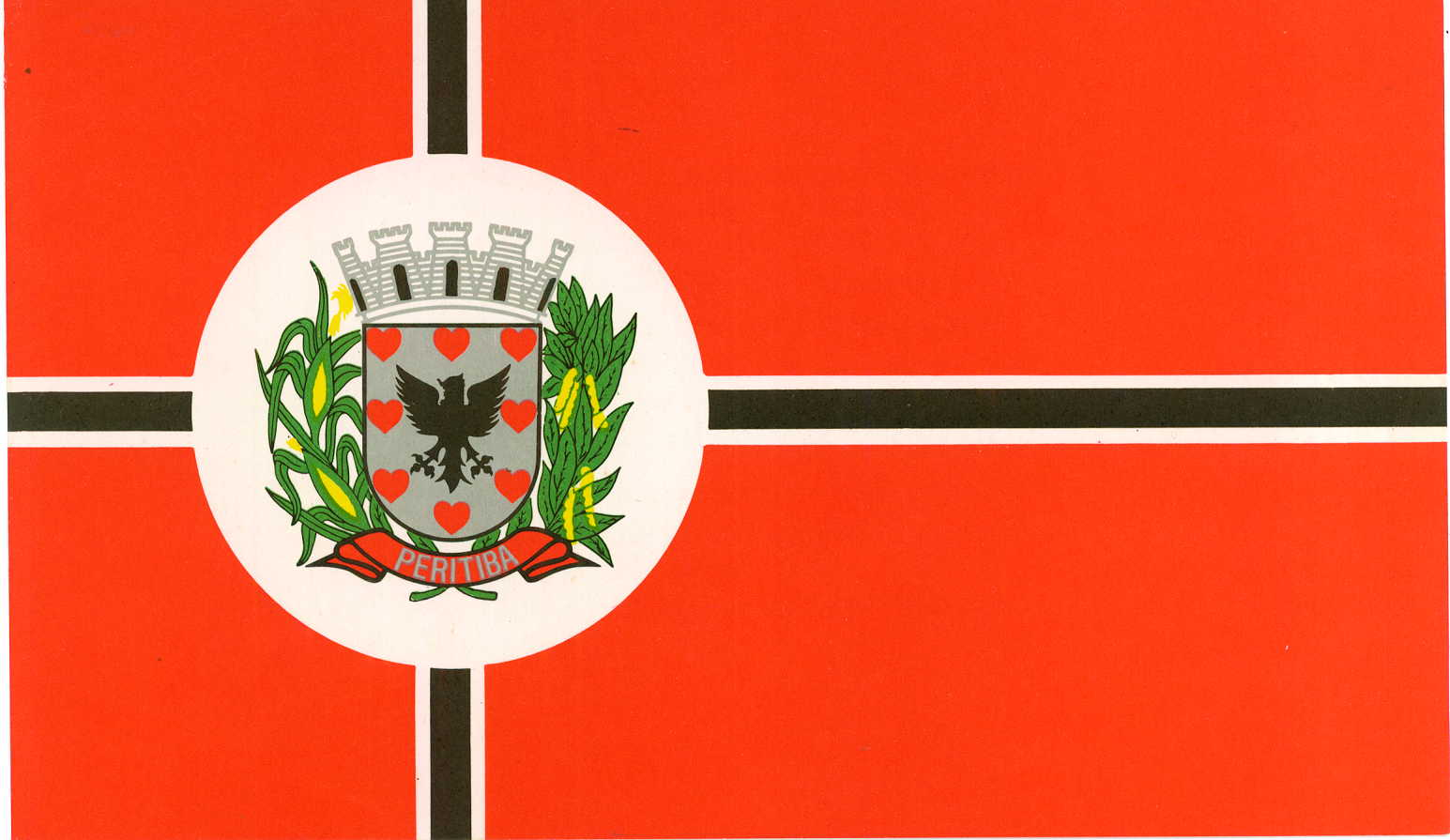
Flag of Peritiba, Santa Catarina

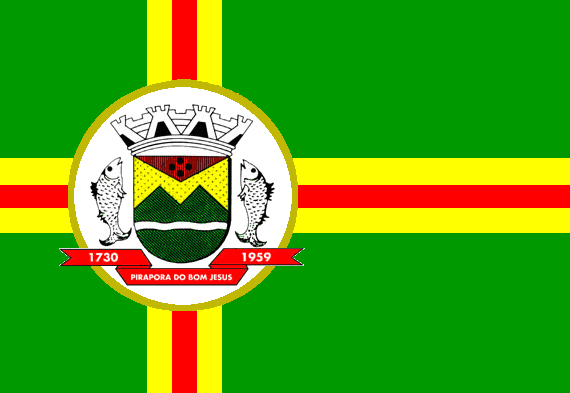
Flag of Pirapora do Bom Jesus, São Paulo State

Flag of Santa Helena, Paraná

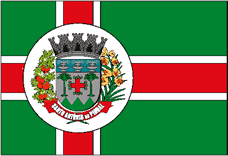
Flag of Santo Antônio do Pinhal, São Paulo State

Flag of Santo Cristo, Rio Grande do Sul

=== Croatia ===
Flag of Pula, Istria

=== Estonia ===
Flag of Pärnu (urban municipality)

Flag of Türi Parish

Flag of Koigi Parish (rural municipality)

Flag of Setomaa Parish (rural municipality)

A proposed design for the national flag of Estonia (1919)

=== France ===
Flag of Calais, Hauts-de-France

Flag of Dol-de-Bretagne, Brittany

Alternative flag of Normandy, nicknamed "St Olaf's Cross"

Alternative flag of Normandy

Flag of Presqu'île de Crozon, Brittany

Viking flag of Vendée, Pays de la Loire

=== Georgia ===
Flag of Tbilisi, Georgia

Flag of the Georgian Orthodox Church

Flag of Gori Municipality

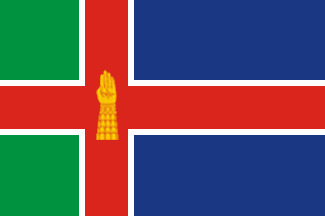
Flag of Khoni Municipality

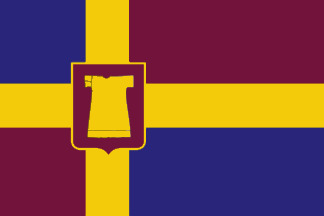
Current flag of Zugdidi Municipality

Old flag of Zugdidi Municipality (2012–2018)

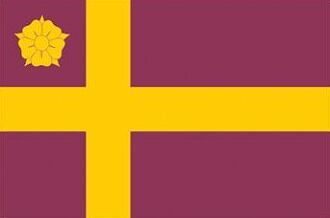
Variation of the old flag of Zugdidi Municipality (2015)

=== Germany ===
Nordic flag designs very similar to Denmark's, Sweden's, and Norway's national flags were proposed as Germany's national flags in both 1919 and 1948, after World War I and World War II, respectively. Today, the Nordic cross is a feature in some city and district flags or coats of arms.

The unofficial 'Noordlandflagg' of Low German-speaking people in northern Germany, northeastern Netherlands and southern Denmark

Teutonic Knights and their State

Flag of the Danish monarch, flown in his capacity as Duke of Holstein, Schleswig and Lauenburg. The three duchies were ceded to Austria and Prussia in 1864 as a result of the Second Schleswig War.

Civil flag of Oldenburg

Former North German Federal Navy Ensign (1867–71), Reichskriegsflagge

Former War Ensign of Nazi Germany (1938–1945), now illegal in Germany

Flag of the former Saar Protectorate, Germany

Proposed National flag of Germany, circa 1919.

Flag proposed by the conspirators of the 20 July plot against Hitler, nowadays often used in a right-wing context. (Wirmer Flag)

A proposed flag for West Germany (1948)

=== Hungary ===
Flag of Balatonszőlős

Flag of Kozármisleny

Flag of Tatárszentgyörgy

Flag of Fűzvölgy

Flag of Pat

=== Latvia ===
Flag of Alūksne, Latvia

Flag of Cēsis

Flag of Cēsis Municipality, 2022–

Flag of Ventspils

Flag of Ventspils Municipality

Flag of the former Grobiņa Municipality, 2011–2021

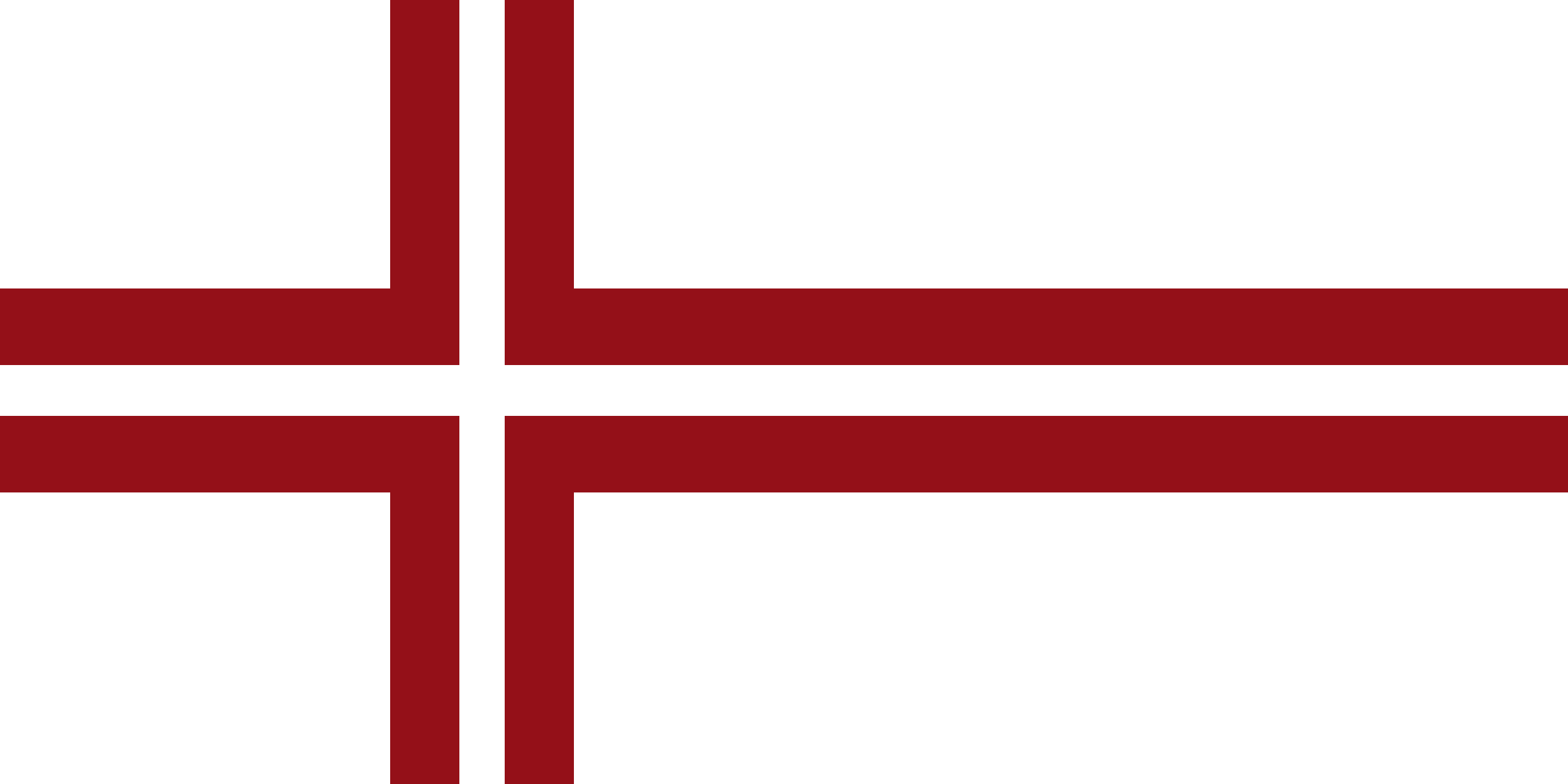
Nordic cross proposal for Latvian flag

=== Lithuania ===
Nordic cross proposal for Lithuanian flag

=== Netherlands ===
Flag of Aldtsjerk

Flag of Bedum

Flag of Havelte

Flag of Hof van Twente

Flag of Koewacht

Flag of Rosmalen

Flag of Skarsterlân

Flag of Tilburg

Flag of Utrechtse Heuvelrug

Flag of Wierden

Flag of Wouw

=== Russia ===
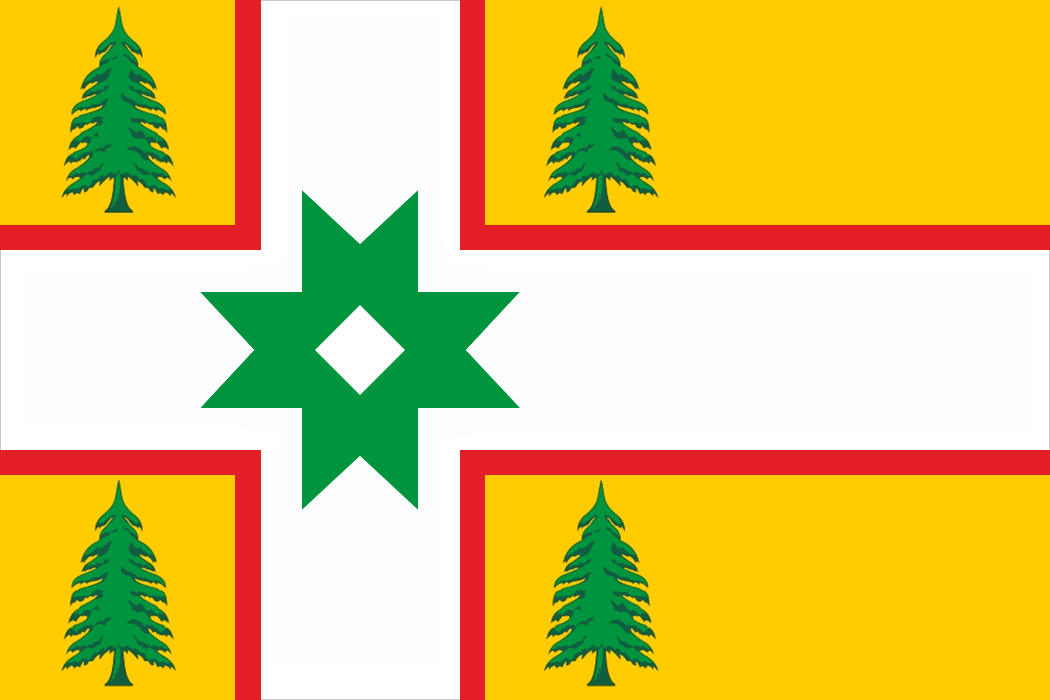
Flag of Alyoshino, Tver Oblast

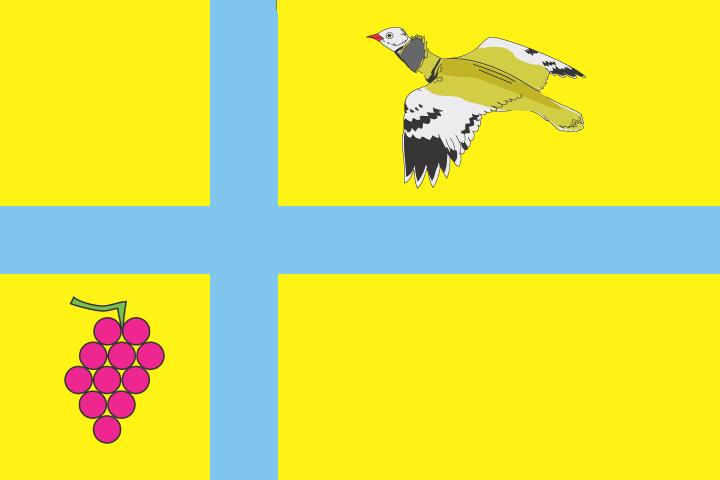
Flag of Levokumsky District

Flag of Likhoslavlsky District

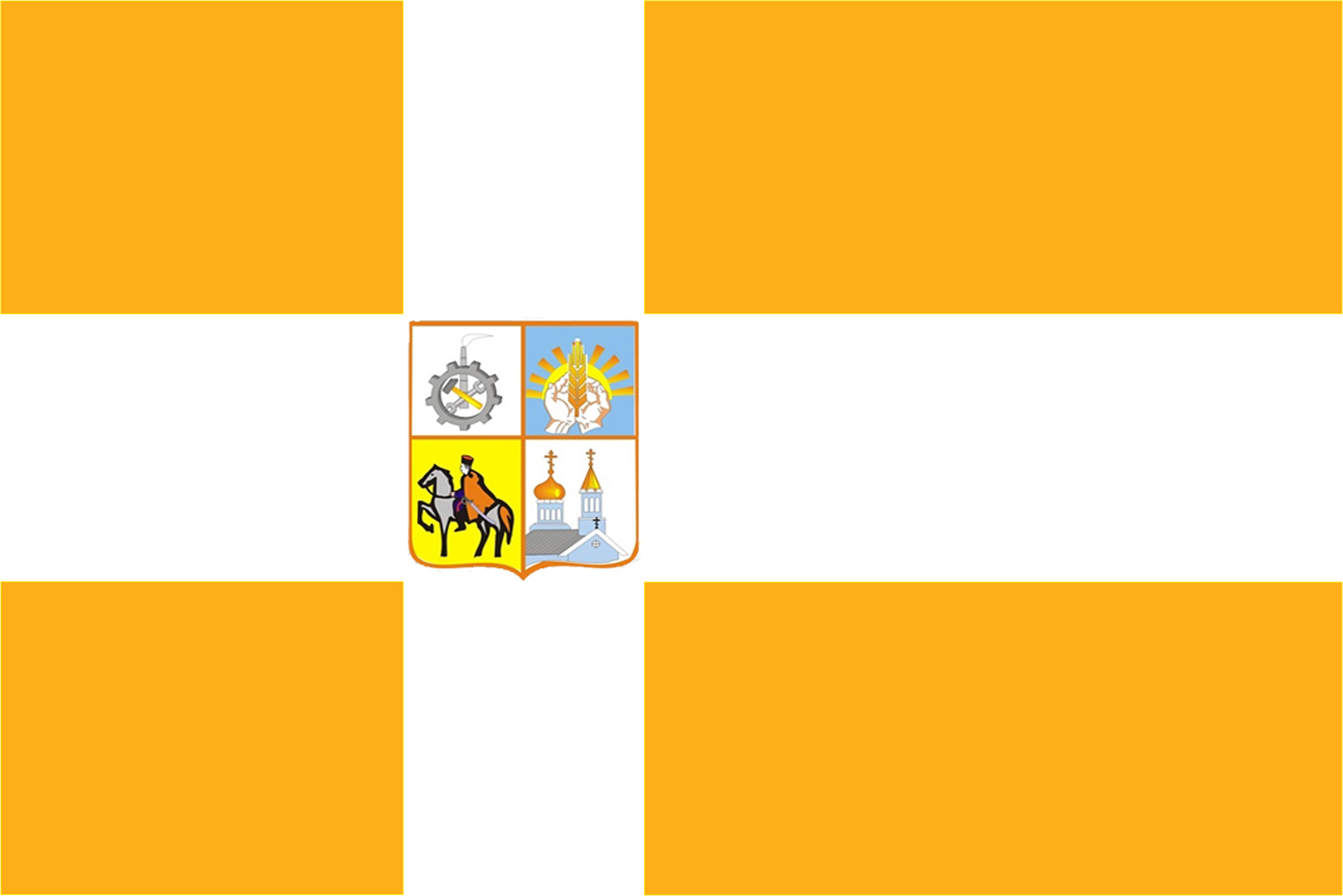
Flag of Mikhaylovsk, Stavropol Krai

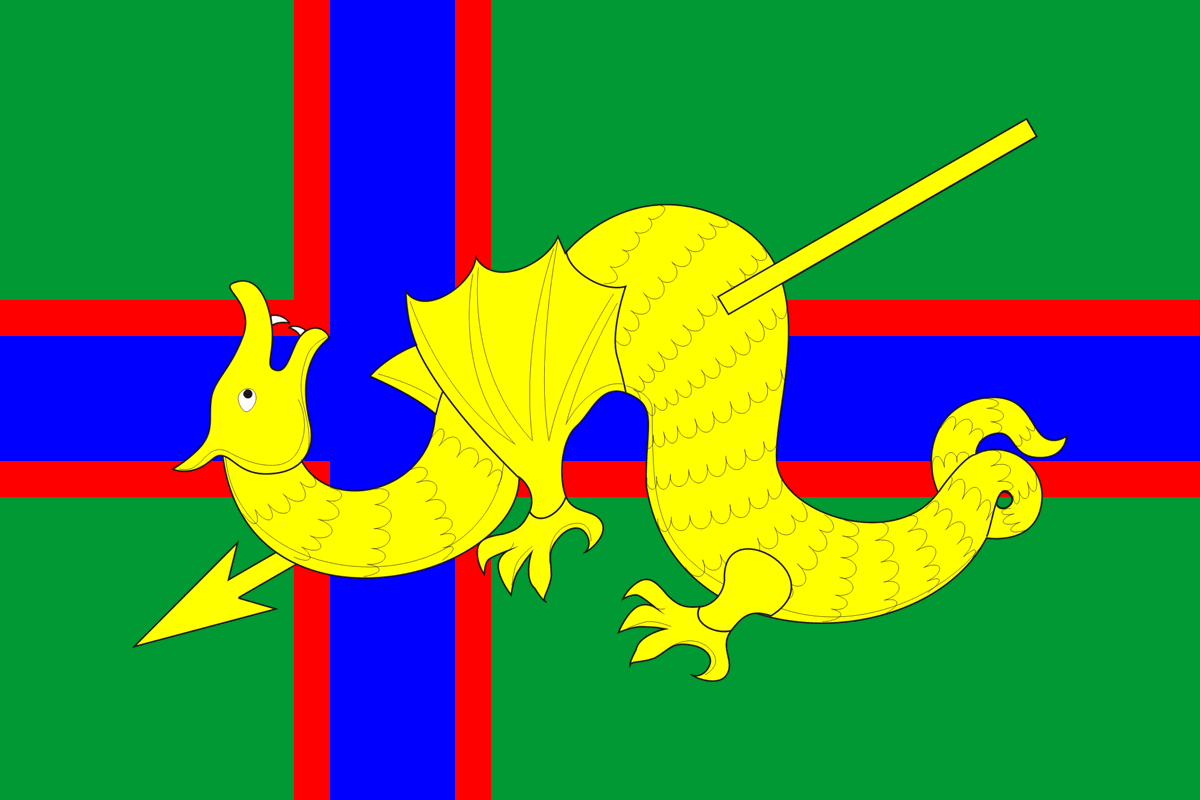
Flag of Mikhaylovskoye, Republic of Karelia

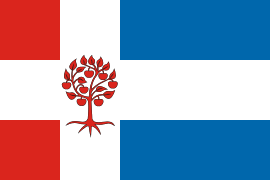
Flag of Plodovskoe, Leningrad Oblast

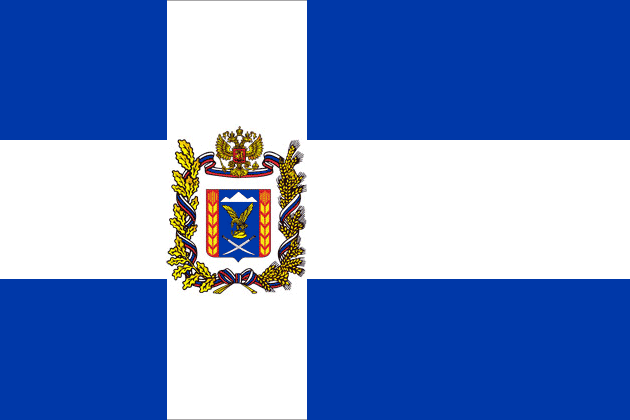
Flag of Predgorny District, 1997–2017

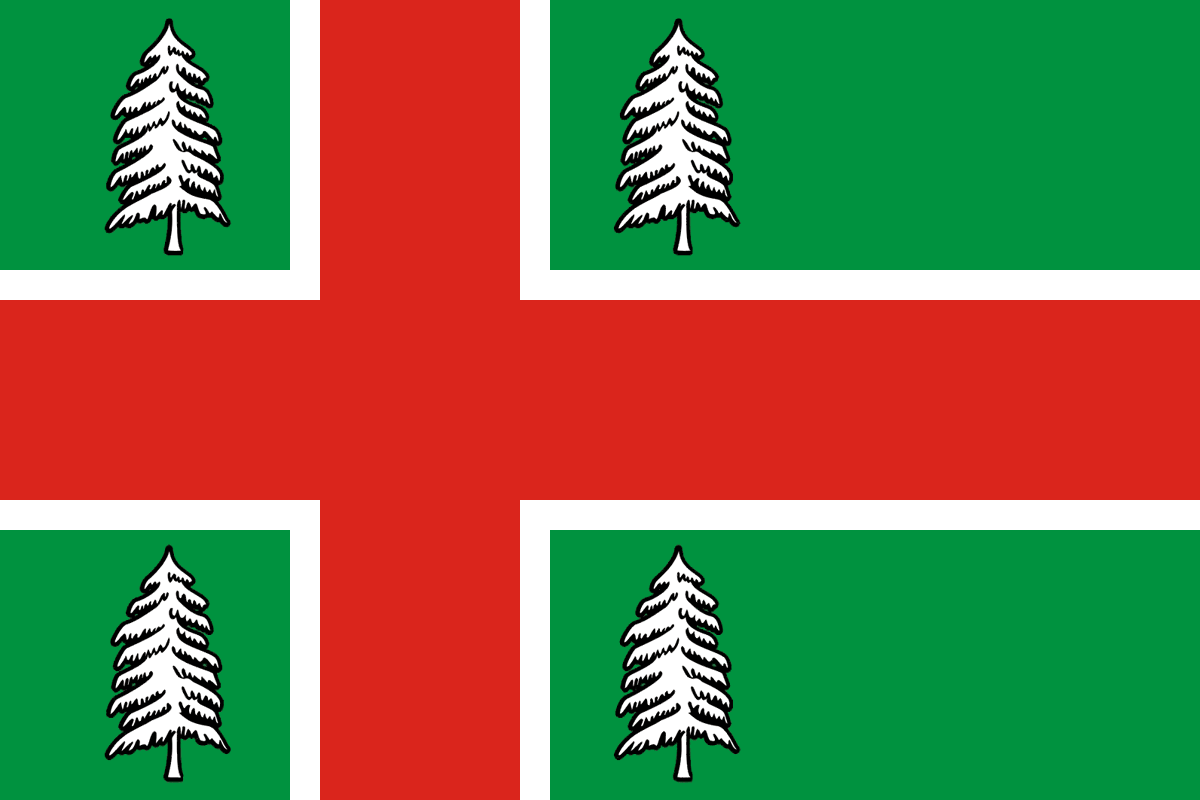
Flag of Rameshki, Tver Oblast

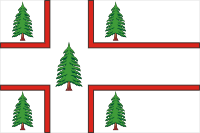
Flag of Rameshkovsky District

Flag of Stavropol

Flag of Stavropol Krai

Former flag of Karelia

=== Spain ===
Flag of Burón

Flag of Casar de Palomero

Flag of Paterna del Río

Alternative flag of Tudela, Navarre

=== Thailand ===
Flag of Uttaradit, 1942–1950s

=== Teutonic Order ===
Flag of the State of the Teutonic Order (1230–1525)

=== Turkey ===
Flag of Autocephalous Turkish Orthodox Patriarchate

=== Ukraine ===
Flag of Volyn Oblast

Flag of Zhytomyr

Flag of Bershad Raion

Flag of Khrestivka

Flag of Lukiv

=== United Kingdom ===
A number of flags for localities in the United Kingdom (primarily Scotland) are based on Nordic cross designs, intended to reflect the Scandinavian heritage introduced to the British Isles during the Viking Age and through the High Middle Ages.

Isle of Barra (recognised 2017)

Flag of Caithness (2016)

Proposed flag of Lancashire (1990s)

Cross of St Magnus, former unofficial Flag of Orkney (1990s)

Flag of Orkney (2007)

Proposed flag of Orkney (2007)

Proposed flag of Orkney (2007)

Flag of Shetland (2005)

Flag of the Isle of Skye (2020)

Proposed flag of Somerset (2013)

Official flag of Sutherland (2018)

Unofficial flag of North Uist (2018)

Flag of the island of South Uist (recognised 2017)

Flag of Yorkshire West Riding (2013)

=== United States ===
Flag of Bayamón, Puerto Rico

Flag of Little Rock, Arkansas

Flag of Staunton, Virginia

Flag of Portland, Oregon

Campaign Flag of the Puerto Rican Independence Party

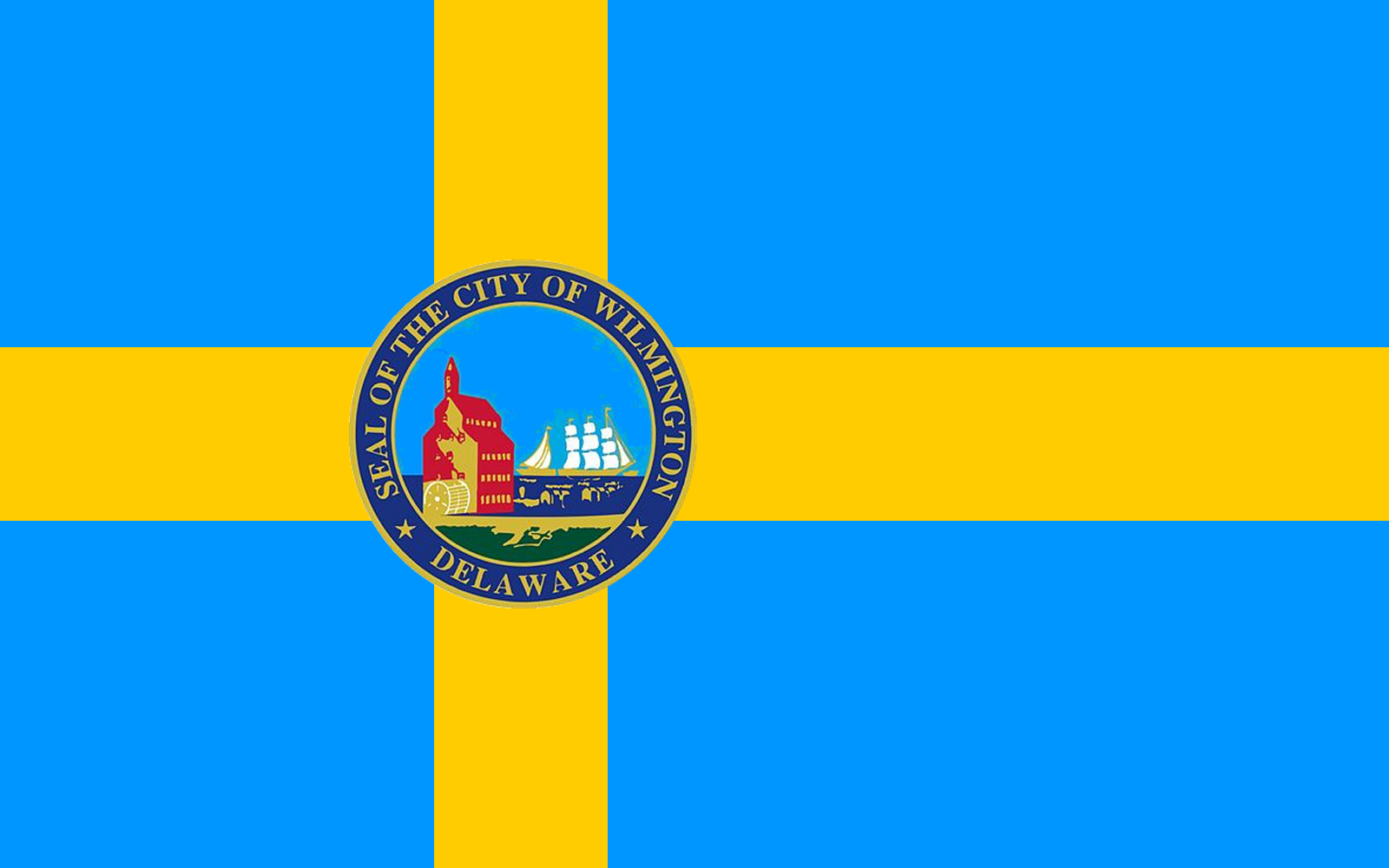
Flag of Wilmington, Delaware

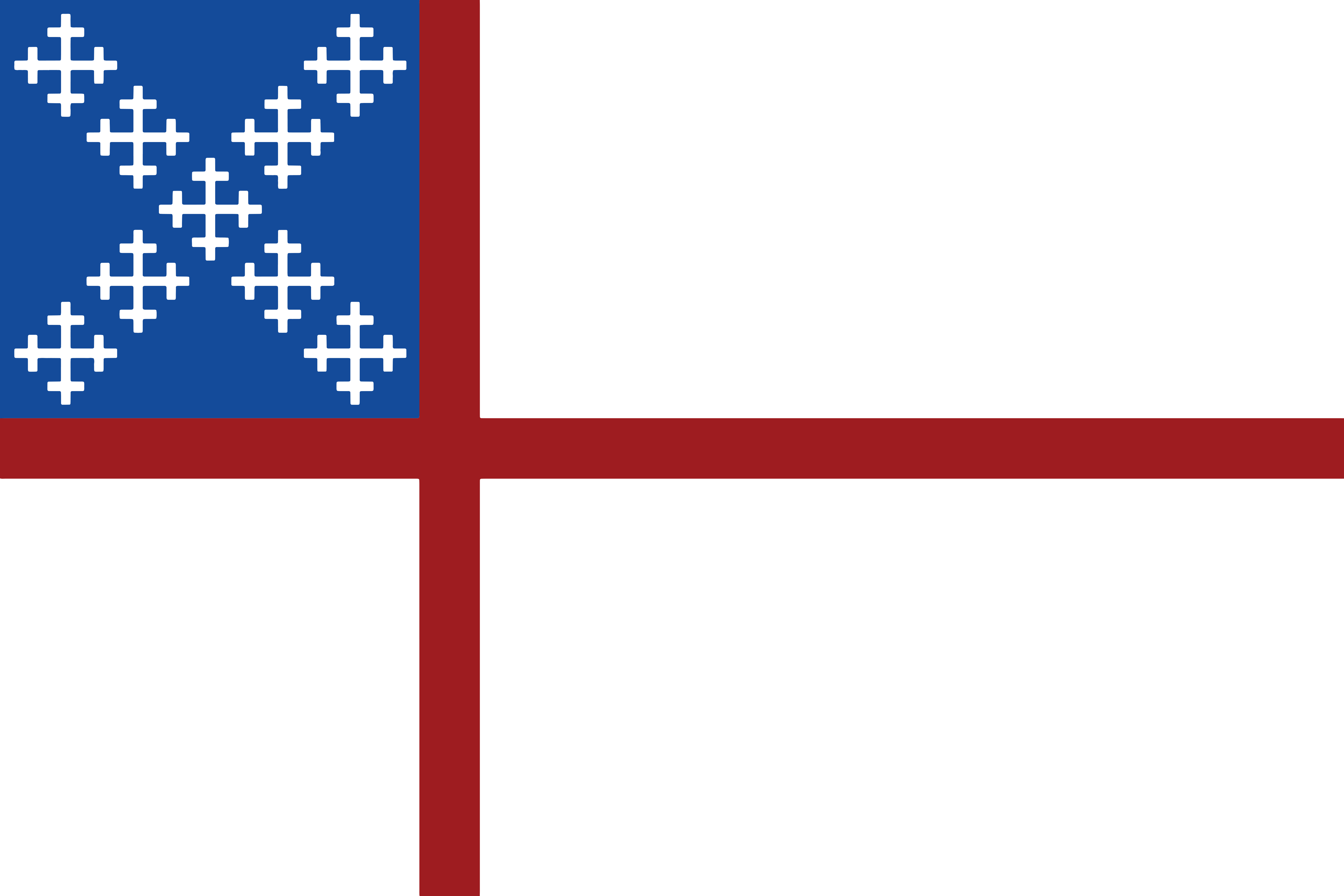
Flag of the Episcopal Church

Flag of New Milford, Connecticut

Flag of Terre Haute, Indiana

=== Other ===
Flag of a Chilean ambassador

Flag of Andalucía, Colombia

Flag of Pula, Croatia

Royal Standard of Greece (1863). George I was also a prince of Denmark.

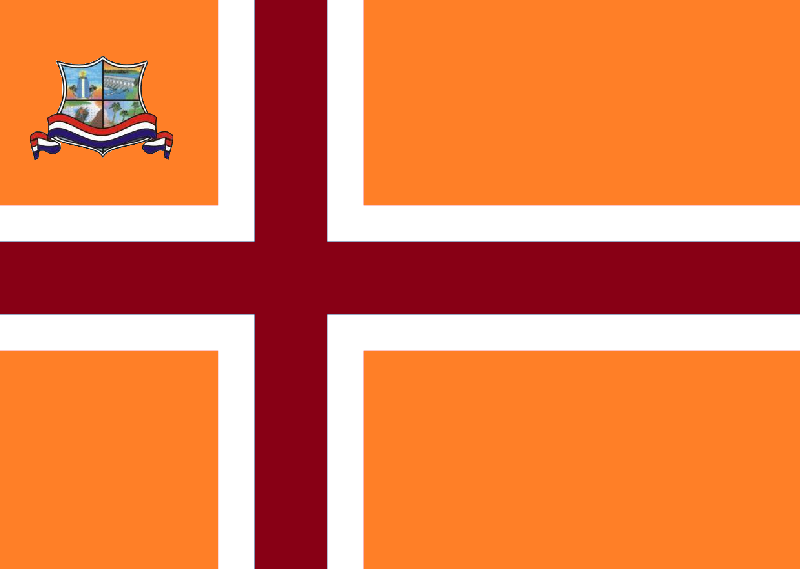
Flag of Hernandarias, Paraguay

Flag of Timor Portuguese refugees flown in Lisbon (1946)

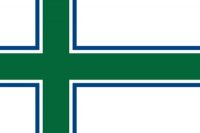
Proposed flag of South Island, New Zealand

Naval ensign of South Africa (1952–1981)

House flag of the South African Marine Corporation (1969–2020)

Naval ensign of Tonga

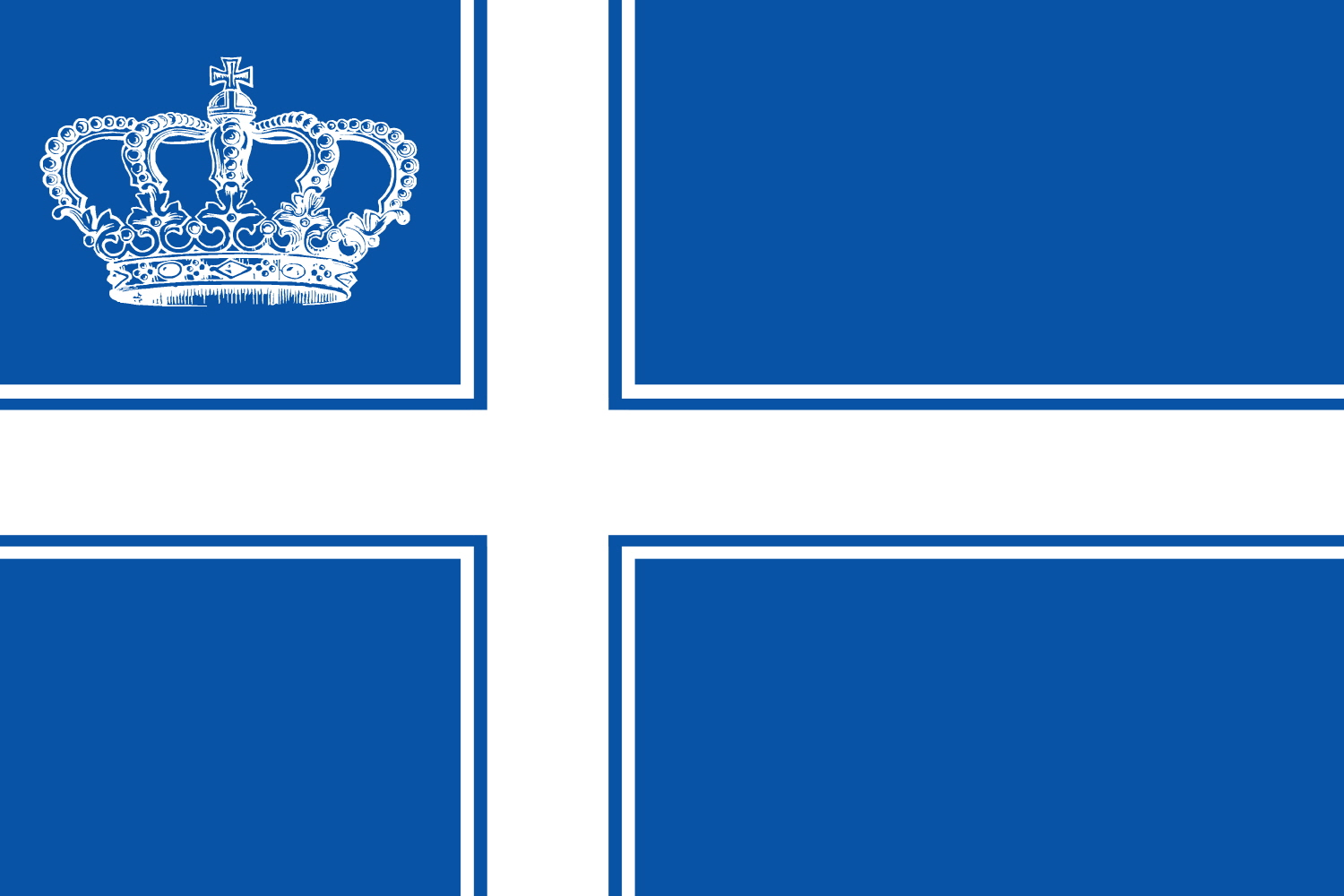
Flag of Westarctica, a micronation claiming Marie Byrd Land in Antarctica

Flag of Ladonia, a micronation in southern Sweden. The white lines are not visible on the flag itself, yet it is still seen as bearing a Nordic Cross as it represents a boiled Swedish flag.

Unofficial flag of the Komi Republic used by activists.

Flag of Amambay Department, Paraguay.

Flag of the Principality of Snake Hill, a micronation in Australia.

The "Vinland flag", used by American band Type O Negative, now a potential White Supremacist logo.

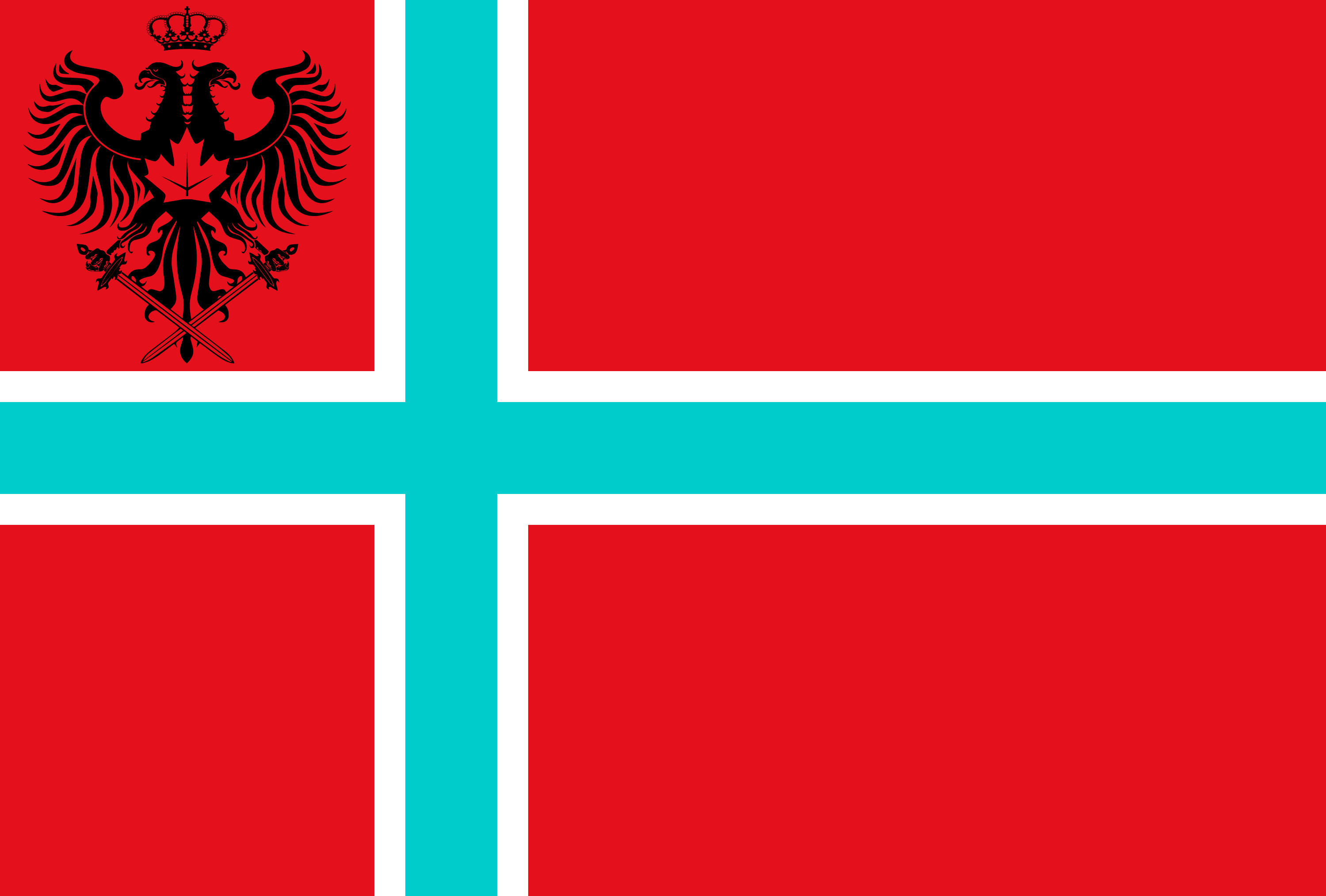
Flag of Vikesland, a Canadian micronation located on a ranch in Manitoba

Flag of the Foundation Interdisciplinary Center for Cultural Studies, Argentina

== Ethnic flags ==
Ethnic flag
Official flag of Ingrian people, designed in 1919 for the Republic of Kirjasalo

Flag of the Veps since 1992, designed by Vitaly Dobrynin. Between 2000 and 2005 it was used as the official flag of Veps National Volost

One of the two flags of Votians

Flag of Provisional Government of East Karelia, designed by Akseli Gallen-Kallela in 1920. Later used as the ethnic flag of Karelians

Flag of the Swedish-speaking Finns (1918)

Flag of the Sweden Finns

Proposed flag of Frisia (2006)

Flag of the Mi'kmaq people, Canada (horizontal version)

Falaise Cross flag (Croix de Falaise) – Falaise in Normandy was the birthplace of William the Conqueror

Not adopted proposal for the flag of Sápmi

Unofficial flag of Ludic Karelians

Flag of Setos

Flag of Forest Finns

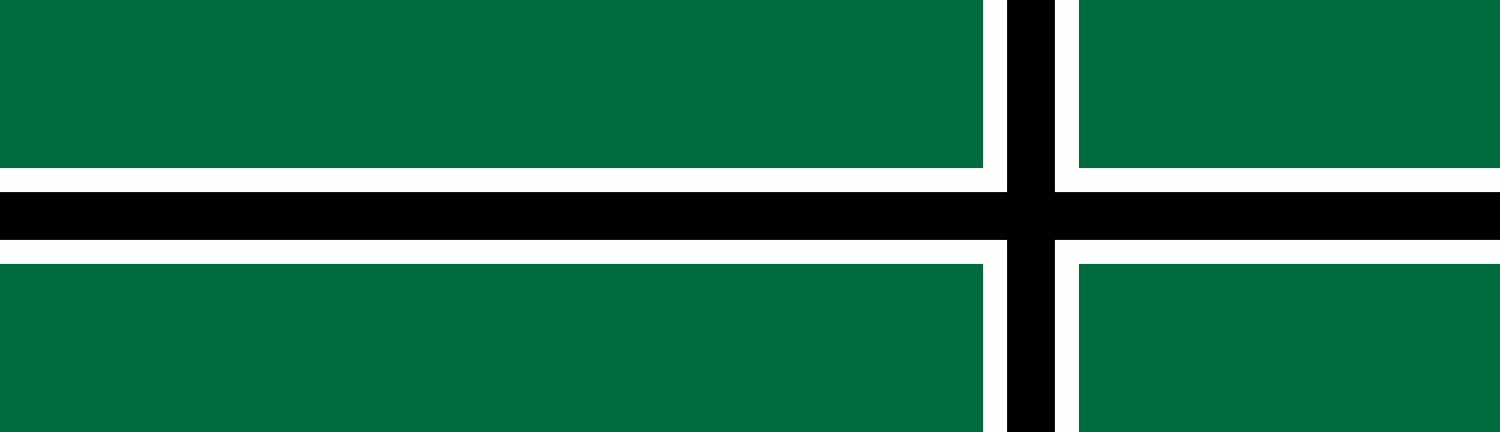
Unofficial flag of Finnskogen

== Political flags ==
Flag of Norwegian fascist party Nasjonal Samling (1933–1945)

== Sport societies ==
Flag of Idrottsföreningen Kamraterna

Ensign of the Hungarian Yachting Association

== Fictional ==
Flag of Latveria, a fictional nation within the Marvel Comics universe

Flag of Norsefire, a fictional neofascist party ruling over the United Kingdom in Alan Moore and David Lloyd's comic series V for Vendetta

Flag of Kekistan, a fictional country created by 4chan members as a political meme and online movement

== See also ==
- Flag families
- Flag of Greenland
- Sámi flag
- Christian cross variants
- Union Flag
- Saint George's Cross
- Household pennant
- Flags of Central America
- Flag of Gran Colombia
- Pan-African colours
- Pan-Arab colours
- Pan-Slavic colours
- Southern Cross Flag
- Triband and Tricolour

== Bibliography ==
- Znamierowski, Alfred (2002). The world encyclopedia of flags : The definitive guide to international flags, banners, standards and ensigns. London: Hermes House. pp. 103 and 134. ISBN 1-84309-042-2.
