= Flag of the Swedish-speaking Finns =

Nordic cross flag

The unofficial flag of Swedish-speaking Finns.

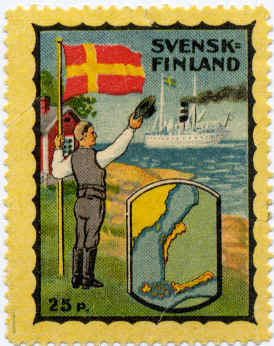
Envelope stamp (not postage) issued by the Swedish People's Party of Finland in 1922 (caption reads Svenskfinland, meaning "Swedish Finland")

The flag of the Swedish-speaking Finns is an unofficial red flag with a yellow cross used in the Swedish-speaking parts of Finland to represent the Finland-Swedes. It may be flown in addition to the Finnish blue and white flag. This flag is unfamiliar to many in Finland but there have been attempts to introduce it again to a broader audience as what is known as "household pennants" (Finnish isännänviirit, Swedish husbondsvimplar) demonstrating one's identity as Swedish-speaking, are more common and can be seen on many flagpoles in areas where there live many Swedish-speaking Finns, especially in countryside.

The flag may have been used in the 16th century, As such, the flag is based on a proposal to civil ensign put forward by the Senate flag committee in 1917. This proposal included nine white roses in the upper left corner. It also contains the same colours as one of the candidates for the Finnish flag on independence in 1917 and may even have been a proposal for the state flag itself. The current blue and white state flag became official on 28 May 1918.

The colours are traditional and based on the red and yellow of the Finnish coat of arms (and can, for example, also be seen in the coat of arms of Southwest Finland). The cross design symbolises the unity with the other Nordic countries. There are probably no official decision on the cross width but a width of not less than that of the Swedish flag, (i.e. 5:2:9 horizontally and vertically 4:2:4) and not more than that of Finland (i.e. 5:3:10 horizontally and 4:3:4 vertically) should apply. It has rectangular boxes rather than squares in the internal corners of the hoist. The flag is similar to that of Scania, but it is more oblong and has a broader and less centred cross.

== Household pennants of Swedish-speaking areas of Finland ==
Ostrobothnia
Southwest Finland
Uusimaa
Åland

== See also ==
- Flag of Scania
- Flag of the Kalmar Union
- Flag of the Nasjonal Samling
