= Svenskfinland =

Areas of Finland with majority Swedish speakers

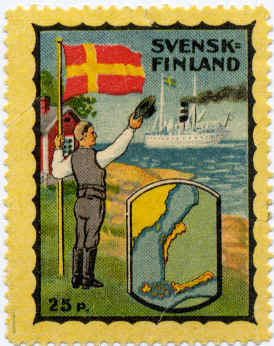
Envelope stamp issued by the Swedish People's party in 1922 featuring the flag of "Swedish Finland" along with a map.

Svenskfinland (lit. 'Swedish Finland') is the common name for the areas in Finland where the majority of the Swedish-speaking population of Finland live or have lived. The term can also more broadly refer to Finland's Swedish-speaking society as a whole, rather than a specific geographic region. Among Swedish-speaking Finns the term is associated with a language-based and cultural autonomy and includes both a geographical space as well as an institutional and cultural connotation that can be noted in activities and organizations related to politics, society, culture, science, business, lifestyle and literature.

It is sometimes jokingly referred to as Ankdammen (lit. '"duck-pond"', Finnish: Ankkalammikko), a term originally coined by Ian Wachtmeister in a 1988 book of the same name about Swedish culture.

== Definition ==
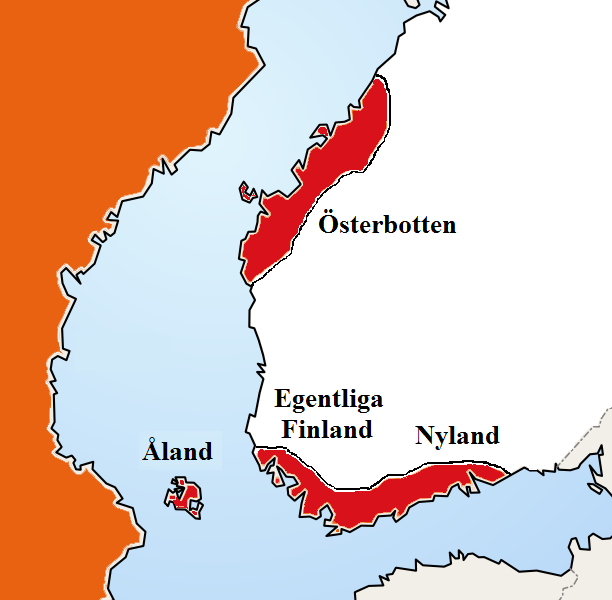
Svenskfinland Sweden

Geographically there are four traditional areas of Svenskfinland:

- Nyland (Finnish: Uusimaa), that is, the northern coast of the Gulf of Finland, from Hangö (Hanko) to Pyttis (Pyhtää), including the capital Helsingfors (Helsinki);
- Southwest Finland, chiefly the region around Åbo (Turku), and especially Åboland;
- Coastal Ostrobothnia;
- Åland (Ahvenanmaa).

Institutionally the term can include institutions with a strong connection to the Swedish-speaking population of Finland, like the Swedish Assembly of Finland, Folkhälsan, Åbo Akademi University, Nyland Brigade and the Diocese of Borgå.

== History ==
At one point in the 19th century, around 15% of the inhabitants of the Grand Duchy of Finland spoke Swedish as a first language, with it enjoying prestige status all over Finland. Following the rise of Fennomania however, there was a nationalistic push for urban Finns to "ditch" Swedish culture, including making a switch for the more "authentic" Finnish language still spoken by the majority of Finland's lower classes. Demographic shifts, particularly 19th and 20th century urbanization, also resulted in some historically Swedish-speaking areas shifting to having a Finnish-speaking majority, as many Finnish speakers from the interior of Finland moved to historically Swedish-speaking cities. These shifts were accelerated by the evacuation of Finnish Karelia, which saw the vast majority of Karelia's population (including the city of Viborg (Viipuri), Finland's largest "monolingual" Finnish city before its annexation into the Soviet Union) resettled elsewhere in Finland, many of whom in large, historically Swedish-speaking or multilingual cities such as Åbo (Turku) and Helsingfors (Helsinki).

Nevertheless, many municipalities in historical Svenskfinland maintain a policy of official bilingualism, while Åland remains monolingually Swedish, as part of a settlement on its historically disputed status. Swedish also enjoys national language status, and is a mandatory subject for all Finnish schoolchildren, regardless of region or cultural background.

== See also ==
- Swedish-speaking population of Finland
- Finland Swedish
