= Flag of Vendsyssel =

Flag of Vendsyssel

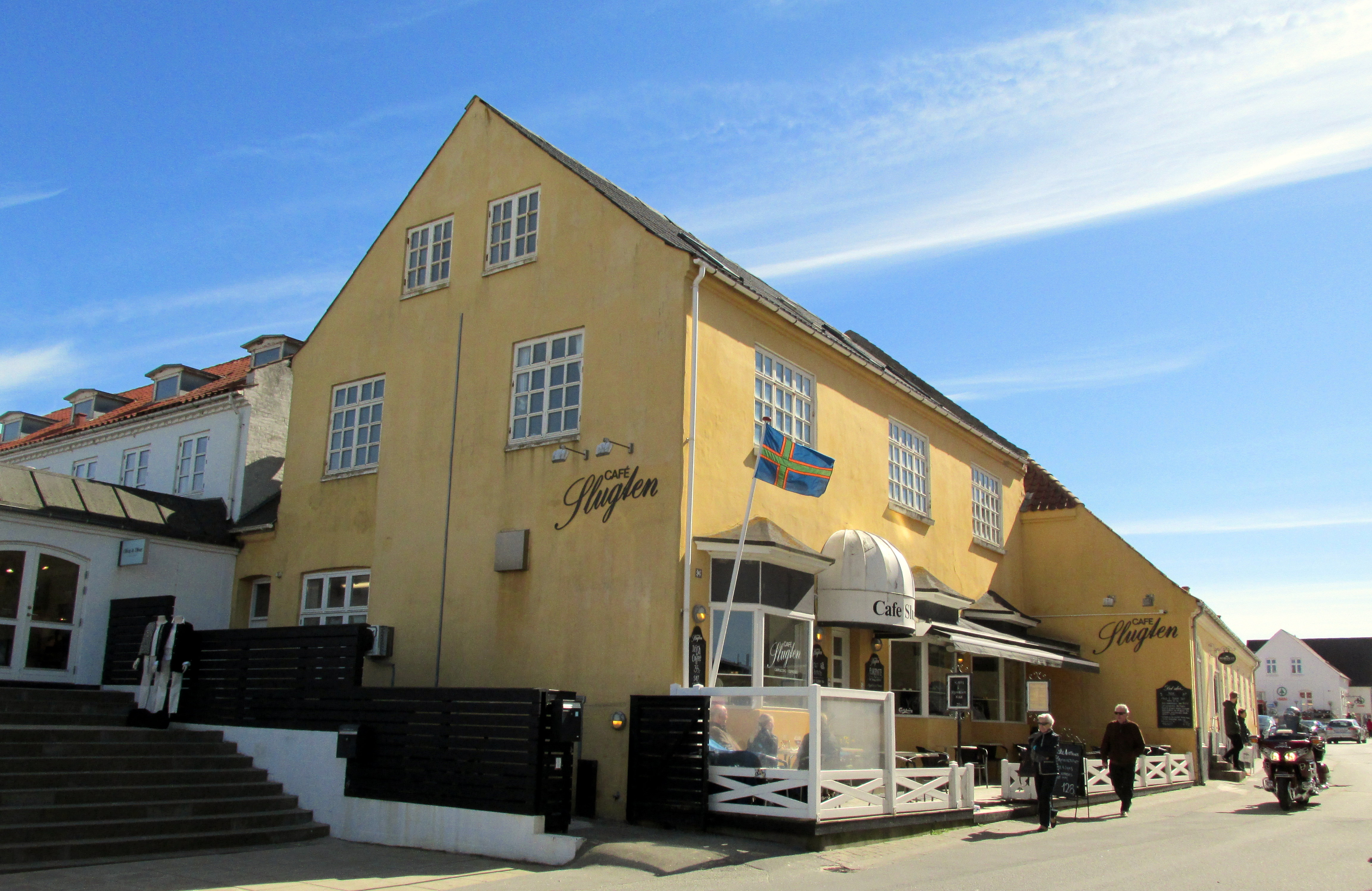
Vendelbrog in Lønstrup, 2015

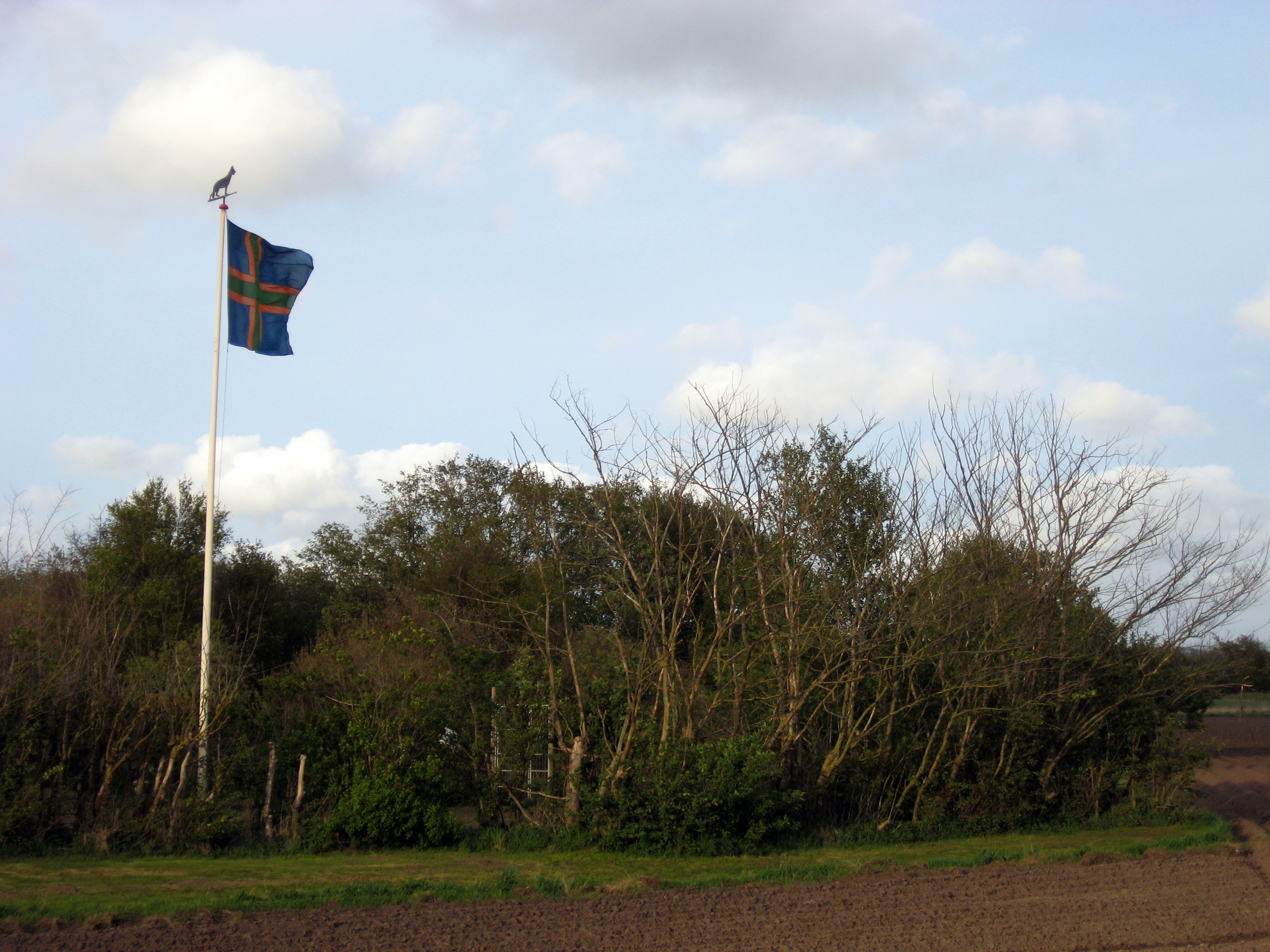
Vendelbrog in Hjørring, 2009

The proposed flag of Vendsyssel in Denmark was introduced by the mayor of Hjørring in 1976, and it is used to some extent throughout the region.

The flag is named Vendelbrog (with reference to the Danish flag Dannebrog interpreted as The Danish cloth).

== Design ==
The flag is a Nordic Cross flag in blue, orange and green. The blue colour symbolizes the sea, the orange/red colour is symbol of the sun and the beaches of Vendsyssel, and the green is for the lush nature.

The flag is not officially recognised, but it used to be a part of the insignia of the Royal Danish Air Force 723rd Air Squadron.
