= Morgan Johansson =

Swedish politician (born 1970)

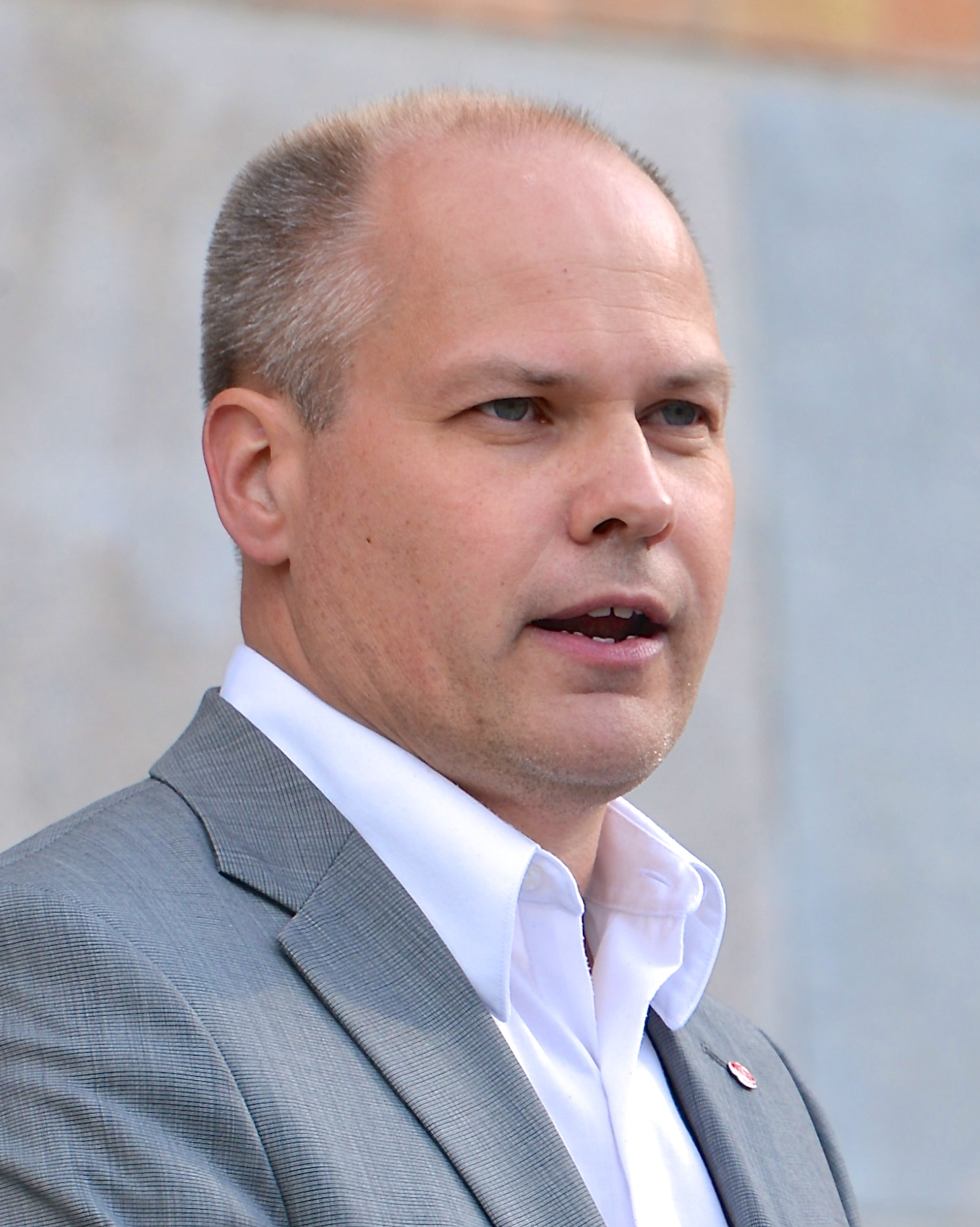
- Johansson in 2014

Deputy Prime Minister of Sweden
- In office 10 September 2019 – 18 October 2022 Serving with Isabella Lövin (2019–2021); Per Bolund (2021)
- Prime Minister: Stefan Löfven; Magdalena Andersson
- Preceded by: Margot Wallström
- Succeeded by: Ebba Busch

Minister for Justice
- In office 3 October 2014 – 18 October 2022
- Prime Minister: Stefan Löfven; Magdalena Andersson
- Preceded by: Beatrice Ask
- Succeeded by: Gunnar Strömmer

Minister for Home Affairs
- In office 30 November 2021 – 17 October 2022
- Prime Minister: Magdalena Andersson
- Preceded by: Mikael Damberg
- Succeeded by: Office abolished
- In office 27 July 2017 – 21 January 2019
- Prime Minister: Stefan Löfven
- Preceded by: Anders Ygeman
- Succeeded by: Mikael Damberg

Minister for Migration and Asylum Policy
- In office 21 January 2019 – 30 November 2021
- Prime Minister: Stefan Löfven
- Preceded by: Heléne Fritzon
- Succeeded by: Anders Ygeman
- In office 3 October 2014 – 27 July 2017
- Prime Minister: Stefan Löfven
- Preceded by: Tobias Billström
- Succeeded by: Heléne Fritzon

Personal details
- Born: Tomas Morgan Johansson; 14 May 1970 (age 56) Höganäs, Sweden
- Party: Social Democratic
- Height: 1.61 m (5 ft 3 in)

Tomas Morgan Johansson (born 14 May 1970) is a Swedish politician of the Social Democrats who served as deputy prime minister of Sweden from 2019 to 2022. He served as Minister for Justice from 2014 to 2022 and as minister for home affairs from 2021 to 2022, having previously served in that position from 2017 to 2019. He also served as Minister for Migration and Asylum Policy from 2014 to 2017 and again from 2019 to 2021.

Johansson was previously Minister for Public Health and Social Services in the Persson Cabinet from 2002 to 2006 and has been a Member of the Riksdag for the southern Skåne County electoral district since the 1998 elections. As a member of the opposition, he was Chairman of the Committee on Justice of the Riksdag from 2010 to 2014.

== Career ==
=== Early career ===
Johansson worked as a journalist and editorial writer for the social democratic daily newspaper Arbetet Nyheterna 1994-1997 and as a political expert in the Prime Minister's Office from 1997 to 1998.

In 2010, author Christer Isaksson described Johansson as a member of the left-leaning faction of the Social Democratic Party. He is also a member of the Swedish Humanist Association and has previously served on the association board.

=== Minister of Justice ===
Johansson was appointed minister of justice on 3 October 2014 in Stefan Löfven's cabinet.

On 23 March 2015, Johansson was attacked at the Broby hospital asylum center in Broby, Östra Göinge Municipality, Skåne. A 25-year-old man charged at Johansson and sprayed him with a fire extinguisher. The attacker was quickly apprehended and Johansson was not injured in what was referred to as a premeditated assault.

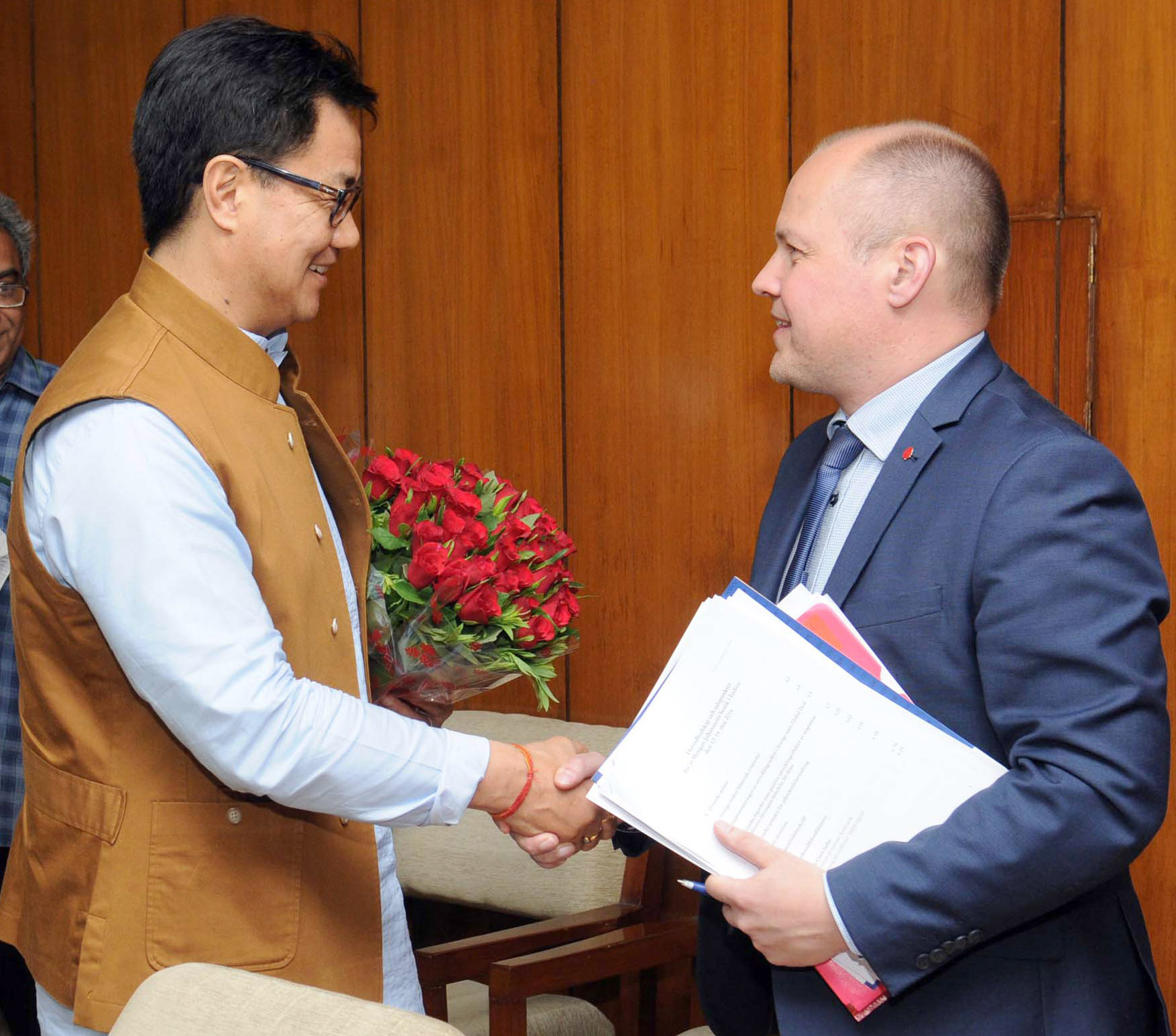
Johansson meeting the Indian Minister of State for Home Affairs Shri Kiren Rijiju, in New Delhi on 12 May 2016.

In November 2019, the Sweden Democrats issued a vote of no confidence at Johansson due to the escalating gang crime and ongoing bombing campaign. No confidence vote was supported by Moderate Party and Christian Democrats, but at 151 votes against the needed 175, did not have enough votes in the Riksdag to carry. Although no confidence vote was interpreted as a signal from those three opposition parties that the government was losing control of the situation.

On 26 December 2020 during the COVID-19 pandemic, Johansson was seen shopping at Nova Lund, a small shopping mall in Lund. He was accompanied with several bodyguards. This was criticised because he violated the recommendations from the Public Health Agency of Sweden. Prime Minister Stefan Löfven condemned the act, saying it was "careless".

On 12 December 2021, Johansson stated that Stockholm police had failed in fighting crime. He also mentioned that municipalities that failed fighting crime could learn from those who successfully did so. He also specified that there were boundaries for how far the government would go when it came to legislation. He also said he did not want to go further with body searches and raising the limit for exclude severe criminal gang members.

On 2 June 2022, the Sweden Democrats announced a motion of no confidence against Johansson due to what they perceived as inaction against criminal gangs. The motion was supported by the Moderates, Christian Democrats, and the Liberals. Prime Minister Magdalena Andersson called the motion "irresponsible" and could have "serious consequences", adding that if the motion is passed, the entire government would resign. Johansson himself stated that the opposition parties were utilising attacks on his person and argued that they did not have any better solutions to reduce the recruitment of people into criminal gangs. Ultimately, the motion failed with 174 votes in favour, one short of the required 175, with independent Amineh Kakabaveh being the key vote in abstaining.

Political offices
Preceded by –	Member of the Riksdag for the south electoral district of Skåne County; 1998–2014	Succeeded by Marianne Pettersson
Preceded by Ingvar Johnsson	Deputy chairman of the Riksdag's Committee on Justice; 2002	Succeeded by Susanne Eberstein
Preceded by Ingela Thalén	Minister for Public Health; 2002–2006	Succeeded by Maria Larsson
Preceded by Thomas Bodström	Chairman of the Riksdag's Committee on Justice; 2010–2014	Succeeded by Beatrice Ask
Preceded by Beatrice Ask	Minister for Justice; 2014–2022	Succeeded by Gunnar Strömmer
Preceded by Tobias Billström	Minister for Migration and Asylum Policy; 2014–2017	Succeeded by Heléne Fritzon
Preceded by Anders Ygeman	Minister for Home Affairs; 2017–2019	Succeeded by Mikael Damberg
Preceded by Heléne Fritzon	Minister for Migration and Asylum Policy; 2019–2021	Succeeded by Anders Ygeman
Preceded by Margot Wallström	Deputy Prime Minister of Sweden; 2019–2022	Succeeded by Ebba Busch
Preceded by Mikael Damberg	Minister for Home Affairs; 2021–2022	Succeeded by None
Order of precedence
Preceded by Svante Lindqvist as former Marshal of the Realm	Swedish order of precedence as Deputy Prime Minister	Succeeded by Government ministers
