= Flag of Tbilisi =

Flag of the Georgian city of Tbilisi

Flag of Tbilisi

The flag of Tbilisi, capital of Georgia, is a rectangular white banner with a blue Nordic-type cross outlined in amber that extends to edges of the flag. The point of crossing is crowned by the central detail from the seal of Tbilisi surrounded by seven-point gold stars lined up in a crescent manner. The flag was adopted on the 8th of June 2005.

== Symbolism ==
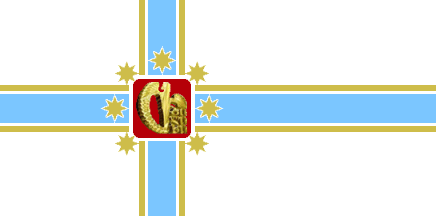
Former flag of Tbilisi designed by Emir Burjanadze.

There are various symbols in the official Tbilisian flag: the T-shaped motif in the shape of a hawk and pheasant represents the tale of King Vakhtang Gorgasali, who established Tbilisi after a pheasant's blood turned a spring hot, leading to the city's name meaning "warm place", the oak fronds instead symbolize strength, eternity and the flow of the Kura. The blue nordic cross symbolizes Georgia's longstanding Christian heritage and invokes Saint George's patronage.
