= Christian Sonesson =

Swedish politician (born 1980)

Member of the Riksdag
- In office 26 September 2022 – 11 October 2022
- Succeeded by: Emma Ahlström Köster
- Constituency: Skåne County Southern

Personal details
- Born: 4 April 1980 (age 46)
- Party: Moderate Party
- Parent: Carl Sonesson (father)
- Relatives: Carl Johan Sonesson (brother); Anja Sonesson (sister-in-law)

Carl Christian Fredrik Sonesson (born 4 April 1980) is a Swedish politician serving as mayor of Staffanstorp since 2013. From September to October 2022, he was a member of the Riksdag.
