= Carl Johan Sonesson =

Swedish politician (born 1978)

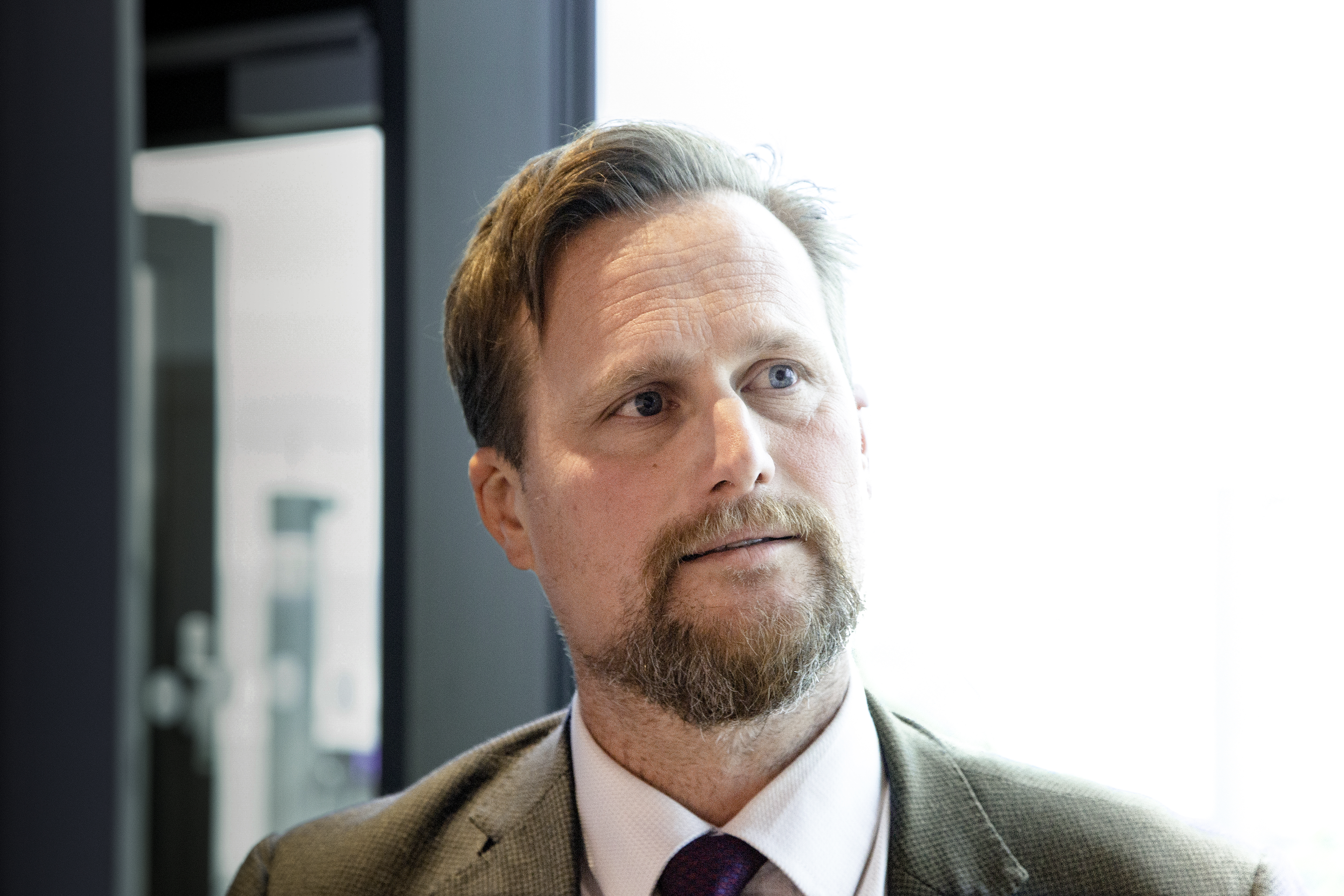
- Sonesson in 2023

Chairman of Region Skåne
- Incumbent
- Assumed office 31 October 2018
- Preceded by: Henrik Fritzon

Personal details
- Born: 23 April 1978 (age 48)
- Party: Moderate Party
- Spouse: Anja Sonesson (divorced)
- Parent: Carl Sonesson (father)
- Relatives: Christian Sonesson (brother)

Carl Johan Fredrik Sonesson (born 23 April 1978) is a Swedish politician serving as chairman of Region Skåne since 2018. He is the son of Carl Sonesson, the brother of Christian Sonesson, and the ex-husband of Anja Sonesson.
