= Emma Ahlström Köster =

Swedish politician (born 1987)

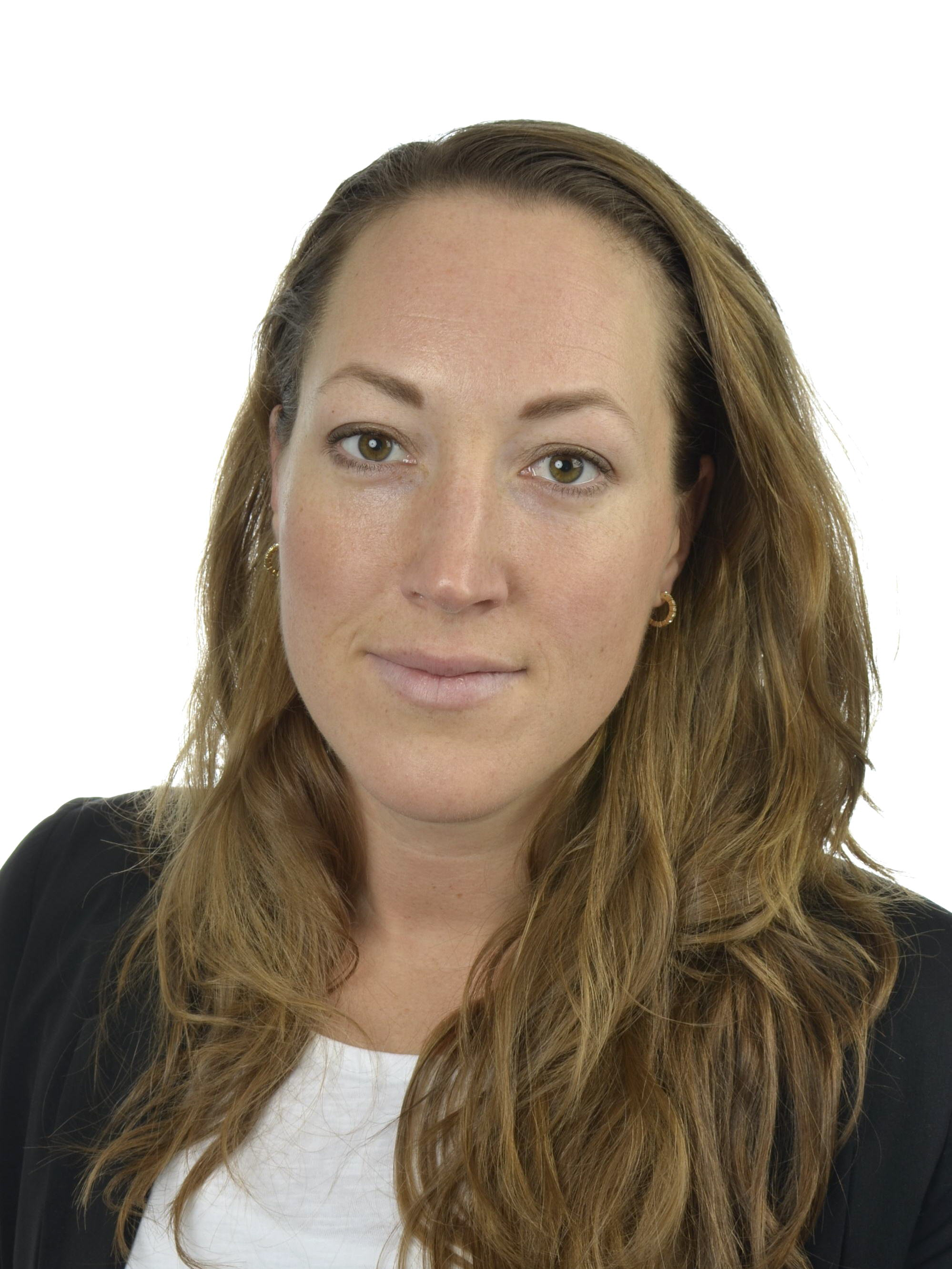
- Ahlström Köster in 2021

Member of the Riksdag
- Incumbent
- Assumed office 12 October 2022
- Preceded by: Christian Sonesson
- Constituency: Skåne County Southern
- In office 29 December 2020 – 23 May 2021
- Preceded by: Louise Meijer
- Succeeded by: Louise Meijer
- Constituency: Skåne County Southern

Personal details
- Born: 28 January 1987 (age 39)
- Party: Moderate Party

Emma Katarina Åsa Ahlström Köster (née Ahlström; born 28 January 1987) is a Swedish politician. She has been a member of the Riksdag since 2022, having previously served from 2020 to 2021. She has been a municipal councillor of Lomma since 2022.
