= Heléne Fritzon =

Swedish politician (born 1960)

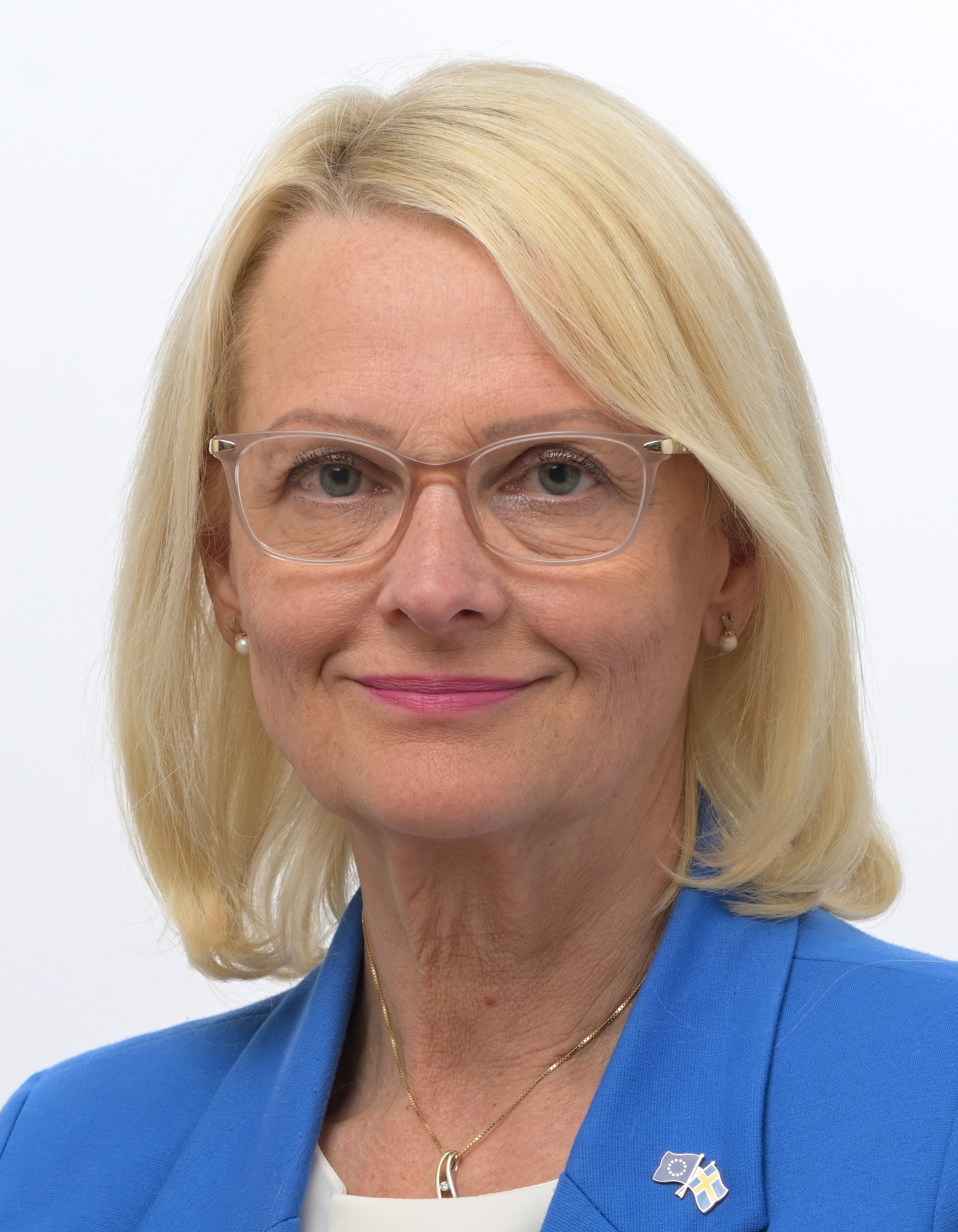

Vice-Chair of the Group of the Progressive Alliance of Socialists and Democrats
- Incumbent
- Assumed office 2 July 2019
- Chair: Iratxe García Pérez
- Serving alongside: Éric Andrieu; Biljana Borzan; Miriam Dalli; Roberto Gualtieri; Bernd Lange; Claude Moraes; Kati Piri; Rovana Plumb

Member of the European Parliament
- Incumbent
- Assumed office 2 July 2019
- Constituency: Sweden

Minister for Migration and Asylum Policy
- In office 27 July 2017 – 21 January 2019
- Monarch: Carl XVI Gustaf
- Prime Minister: Stefan Löfven
- Preceded by: Morgan Johansson
- Succeeded by: Morgan Johansson

Personal details
- Born: 29 September 1960 (age 66) Kristianstad, Sweden
- Party: Social Democrats
- Spouse: Henrik Fritzon

Marie Heléne Elisabeth Fritzon (born 29 September 1960) is a Swedish politician of the Social Democrats. She has been Member of the European Parliament (MEP) and Vice-Chair of the Group of the Progressive Alliance of Socialists and Democrats since July 2019.

Fritzon served as Minister for Migration and Asylum Policy from 2017 to 2019. Before becoming a cabinet minister, Fritzon was Mayor of Kristianstad Municipality.

== Career ==
=== Minister for Migration ===
Fritzon was appointed Minister for Migration on 27 July 2017. At the same time, she was appointed Deputy Minister for Justice.

=== Member of the European Parliament ===
Fritzon was elected Member of the European Parliament in the 2019 European Parliament election in Sweden. In parliament, she has since been serving as vice-chair of the S&D Group, under the leadership of chairwoman Iratxe García. She has also been a member of the Committee on Women's Rights and Gender Equality. In 2022, she joined the Special Committee on the COVID-19 pandemic.

In addition to her committee assignments, Fritzon has been part of the Parliament's delegation to the ACP–EU Joint Parliamentary Assembly. She is also a member of the European Parliament Intergroup on Anti-Racism and Diversity and the European Parliament Intergroup on LGBT Rights.

== Personal life ==
She was born in Kristianstad.

Fritzon is married to Henrik Fritzon, the former chair of the executive committee of the Skåne Regional Council (2014–2018), and they live in Degeberga, Kristianstad Municipality.

Political offices
Preceded by Morgan Johansson	Minister for Migration; 2017–2019	Succeeded by Morgan Johansson
