= Frei Martinho =

- Municipality
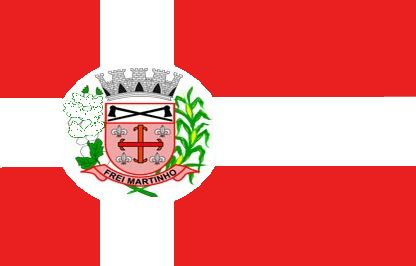
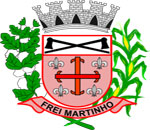
- Flag Coat of arms

- Location in Brazil
- Coordinates: 6°24′S 36°27′W
- Country: Brazil
- Region: South
- State: Paraíba
- Mesoregion: Boborema

Population (2010)
  - Total: 2,933
- Time zone: UTC−3 (BRT)

Frei Martinho is a municipality in the state of Paraíba in the Northeast Region of Brazil.

== See also ==
- List of municipalities in Paraíba
