= Region Skåne =

Regional council of Skåne County, Sweden

Coordinates: 56°00′N 13°27′E

- Regional council
- Formation: 1 January 1999
- Region: Skåne
- Country: Sweden
- Website: Official website

Legislative branch
- Legislature: Regional assembly
- Assembly members: 149
- Chair: Carl Johan Sonesson
- Meeting place: Skåne Town Hall, Kristianstad

Executive branch
- Chair: Carl Johan Sonesson

Region Skåne is the regional council of Skåne County in Scania, Sweden. Region Skåne was formed on 1 January 1999 by the amalgamation of the county councils of Malmöhus County and Kristianstad County and some of the tasks handled by Malmö Municipality.

The regional assembly is the highest political body in the region and its members are elected by the population of Skåne Country, as opposed to the County Administrative Board (länsstyrelsen) which represents the interests of the state within the county, under the chairmanship of the county governor.

The region's main responsibility is for the public healthcare system, public transport and development within the region, which includes co-ordination of development of commerce, communication, culture and collaboration with other regions both in and outside of Sweden.

By devolution the newly formed region assumed some powers from the Skåne County Administrative Board, the state authority in Skåne County.

Before Region Skåne was formed in 1999 on a trial basis, the regional development was the responsibility of a Regional Association, comprising the 33 municipalities together with the then current health services principals, namely the Kristianstad and Malmöhus county councils and the Health Services authority in the City of Malmö.

Similar provisions had also been extended to the Region Västra Götaland and the Region Gotland during a trial period.

== Regional assembly ==
The regional assembly (Swedish: regionfullmäktige, formerly landstingsfullmäktige) meets at Skåne Town Hall in Kristianstad. Elections are held every fourth year in conjunction with the national and municipal elections, on the third Sunday of September.

The executive body of the Region Skåne is the Regional Executive Committee (regionstyrelsen). The current chair of the executive committee is Carl Johan Sonesson of the Moderate Party, who succeeded Henrik Fritzon of the Social Democratic Party following the 2018 elections.

Region Skåne election, 2022
Party	Seats	Votes	%
Socialdemokratiska arbetarpartiet	44	247,972	29.15%
Moderaterna	33	185,353	21.79%
Sverigedemokraterna	30	169,653	19.94%
Vänsterpartiet	12	64,486	7.58%
Kristdemokraterna	9	49,632	5.83%
Liberalerna	8	44,487	5.23%
Centerpartiet	7	39,698	4.67%
Miljöpartiet de gröna	6	31,138	3.66%
Others	-	18.343	2.16%
Total	149	850,762	100%
Turnout		864,286	79.19%

Skåne Regional Council election, 2018
Party	Seats	Votes	%
Socialdemokratiska arbetarpartiet	41	230,625	27.31%
Moderaterna	34	190,857	22.60%
Sverigedemokraterna	30	166,195	19.68%
Vänsterpartiet	10	56,745	6.72%
Liberalerna	10	53,468	6.33%
Centerpartiet	10	53,400	6.32%
Kristdemokraterna	8	45,717	5.41%
Miljöpartiet de gröna	6	34,496	4.08%
Others	-	13,098	1.55%
Total	149	844,602	100%
Turnout		857,300	82.64%

Region Skåne election, 2014
Party	Seats	Votes	%
Socialdemokratiska arbetarpartiet	51	257,704	32.38%
Moderaterna	35	177,657	22.32%
Sverigedemokraterna	23	115,735	14.54%
Miljöpartiet de gröna	11	52,987	6.66%
Folkpartiet liberalerna	9	47,199	5.93%
Vänsterpartiet	8	42,324	5.32%
Centerpartiet	7	33,570	4.22%
Kristdemokraterna	5	26,094	3.28%
Others	-	42,718	5.37%
Total	149	795,988	100%
Turnout		808,239	80.51%

Region Skåne election, 2010
Party	Seats	Votes	%
Moderaterna	48	232,743	30.89%
Socialdemokratiska arbetarpartiet	47	230,133	30.54%
Sverigedemokraterna	14	69,928	9.28%
Folkpartiet liberalerna	12	58,962	7.82%
Miljöpartiet de gröna	10	49,994	6.63%
Centerpartiet	7	34,213	4.54%
Vänsterpartiet	6	29,415	3.90%
Kristdemokraterna	5	26,283	3.49%
Others	-	21,876	2.90%
Total	149	753,547	100%
Turnout		767,163	79.00%

Region Skåne election, 2006
Party	Seats	Votes	%
Socialdemokratiska arbetarpartiet	53	240,312	34.4%
Moderaterna	43	195,014	27.9%
Folkpartiet liberalerna	13	59,065	8.5%
Sverigedemokraterna	10	45,945	6.6%
Centerpartiet	9	41,154	5.9%
Kristdemokraterna	7	32,878	4.7%
Miljöpartiet de gröna	7	30,670	4.4%
Vänsterpartiet	7	29,325	4.2%
Others	-	24,127	3.4%
Total	149	698,490	100%
Turnout		715,859	77.6%

== See also ==
- Politics of Sweden
- Elections in Sweden
