= Henrik Fritzon =

Swedish politician

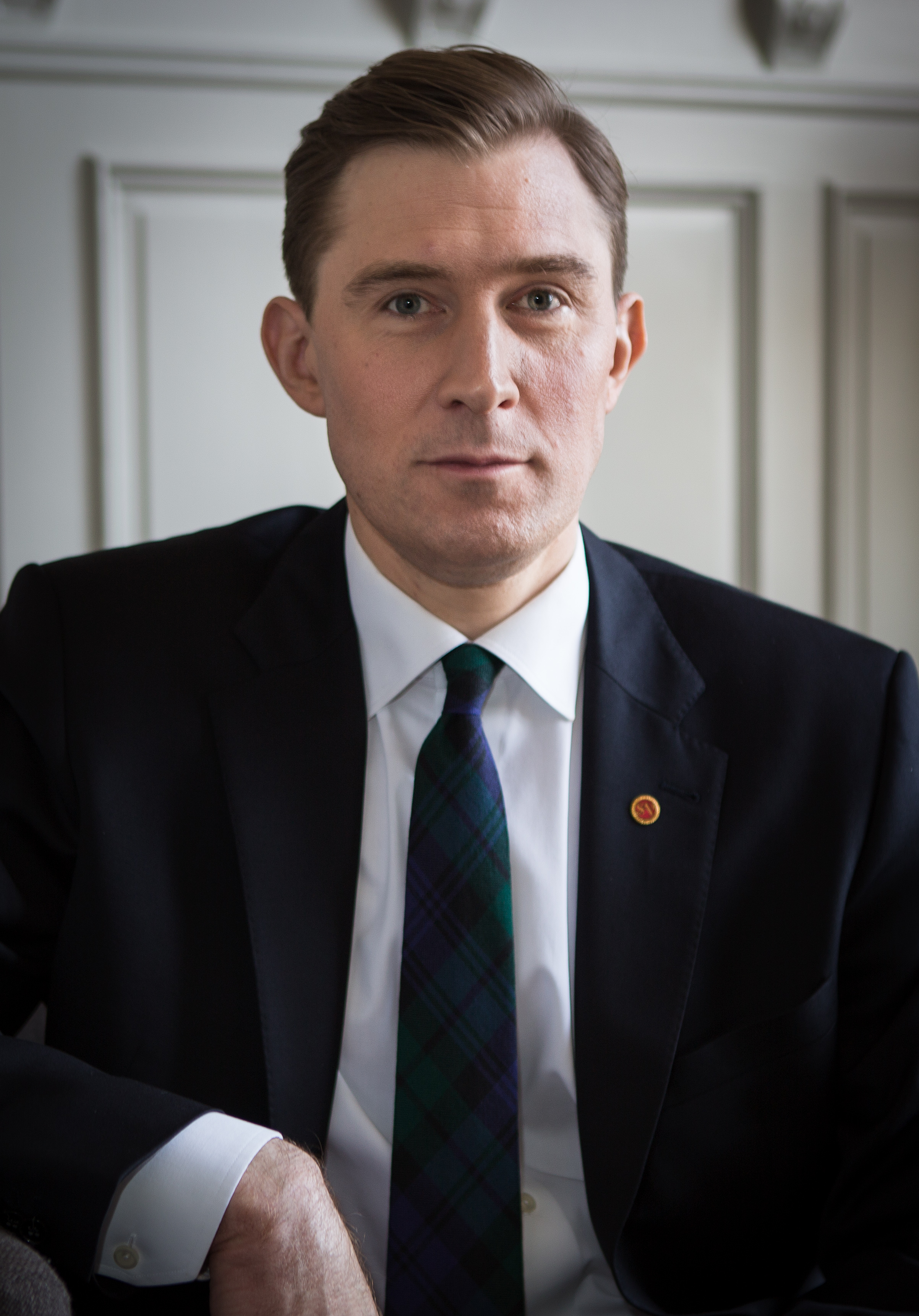

Chair of the Executive Committee of the Skåne Regional Council
- In office 1 November 2014 – 31 October 2018
- Preceded by: Pia Kinhult
- Succeeded by: Carl Johan Sonesson

Personal details
- Born: 3 July 1972 (age 53) Jönköping, Sweden
- Party: Social Democrats
- Spouse: Heléne Fritzon

Henrik Fritzon (born 3 July 1972) is a Swedish politician of the Social Democrats. He was the Chair of the Executive Committee of the Skåne Regional Council from 2014 to 2018.

He is married to Heléne Fritzon, the former Minister for Migration and Asylum Policy, and they live in Degeberga, Kristianstad Municipality.
