= Emblems of the Kalmar Union =

Union of Denmark, Norway and Sweden

The flag as described by Eric of Pomerania

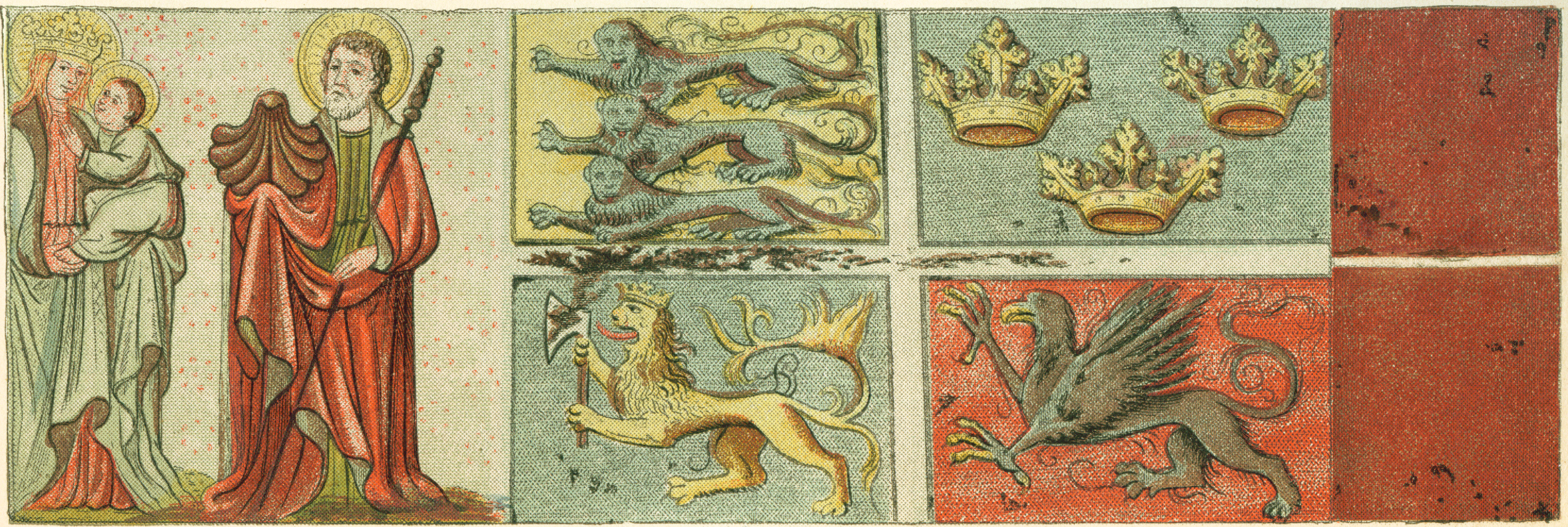
Drawing of a naval flag captured from a Danish ship in a naval battle in Øresund by the Hanseatic League in 1427, displaying the arms of Denmark, Sweden, Norway and Pomerania.

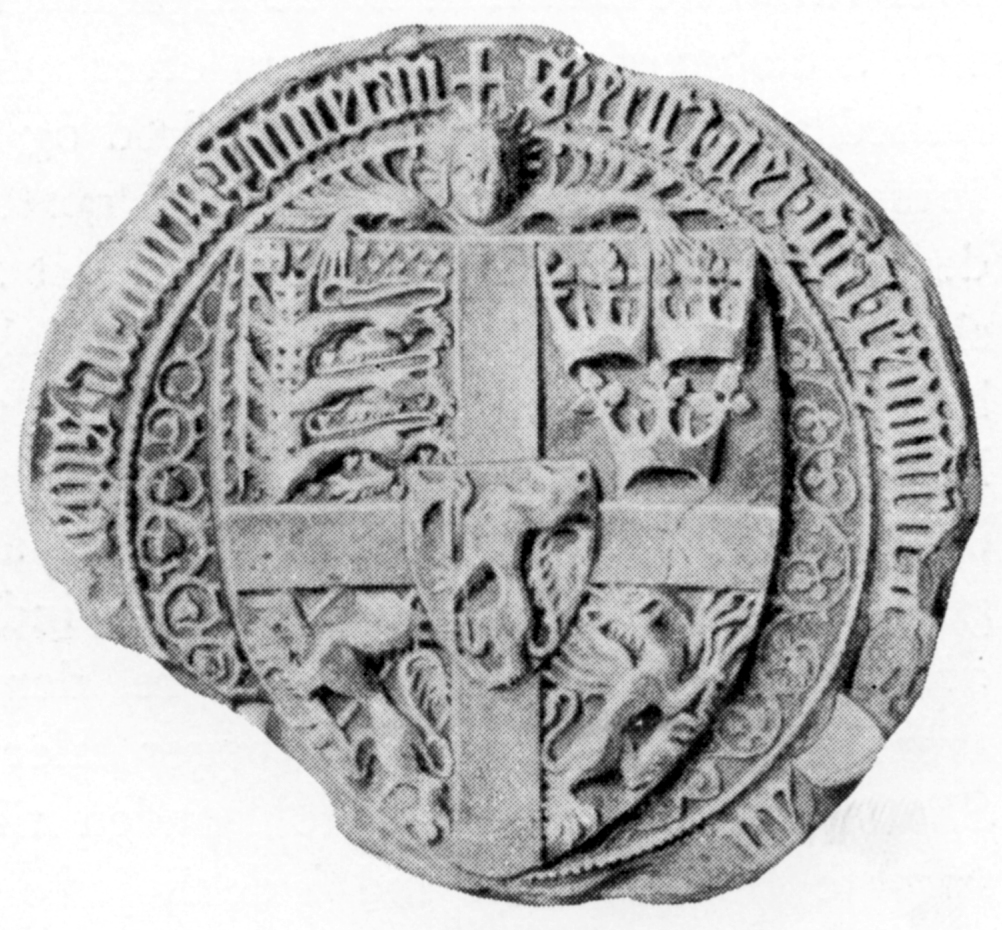
Royal seal of Eric of Pomerania (1398)

The Kalmar Union was the personal union of the kingdoms of Denmark, Norway and Sweden during the 15th century. The first king of the Kalmar Union was Eric of Pomerania. His seal combined the coats of arms of Norway (center, as an inescutcheon upon a cross over all), Denmark (in dexter chief), Sweden (the Folkung lion, in dexter base) and Pomerania (a griffin, in sinister base), and in addition the Three Crowns symbol in sinister chief; the latter heraldic design predates the Kalmar Union, and is now mostly associated with the coat of arms of Sweden, but which during the 15th century came to represent the three kingdoms of the union.

In two letters dated to 1430, Eric of Pomerania orders the priests of Vadstena and Kalmar to wear the "banner of the realms" on their robes. The banner is described as "a red cross in a yellow field".
