= Coat of arms of Finland =

Versions
- The banner of arms, which served as state flag from December 1917 to May 1918
- Armiger: Republic of Finland
- Adopted: First documented in the 1580s. Current version official since 1978.
- Shield: Gules, between nine roses Argent a lion rampant Or, crowned langued and armed of the same, trampling a scimitar Argent hilted Or fesswise and to the sinister; his dexter hand vambraced Argent and cowtered Or bears aloft a sword Argent hilted and pommeled Or.

The coat of arms of Finland is a crowned lion on a red field, the right foreleg replaced with an armoured human arm brandishing a sword, trampling on a sabre with the hindpaws. The Finnish coat of arms was originally created around the year 1580.

== Background ==
=== The lion in Finnish heraldry ===
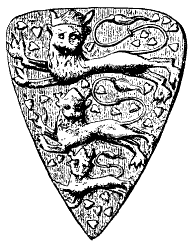
Figure 2: Coat of arms of Valdemar Birgersson

The heraldic lion is quite common in Western Europe, and several European countries incorporate it into their national coats of arms. In Nordic heraldry, the lion is first found in the coat of arms of Denmark in the later part of the 12th century.

Starting in the 13th century, the territory of today's Finland was gradually incorporated into the Swedish kingdom, and this coincided with the period when coats of arms first came into use in northern Europe. The first known use of the lion in Sweden was on the royal seals of Erik Knutsson (died 1216) and Erik Eriksson (1216–1250), who used two and three lions on their seal, respectively. The first king of the House of Bjälbo, Valdemar Birgersson (1239–1302), also used 3 lions on his seal (Figure 2).

=== Finland as a duchy ===
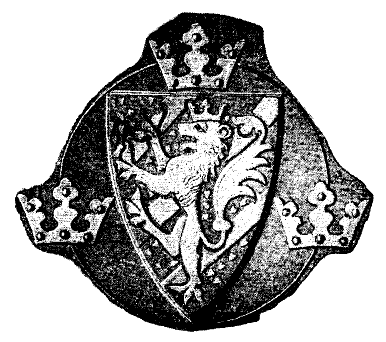
Figure 3: Bjälbo coat of arms

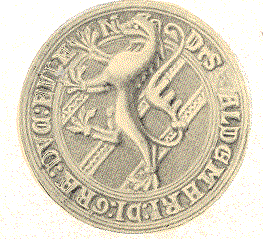
Figure 4: Seal of Duke Valdemar

Bengt Birgersson, the first duke of Finland (1254–1291; duke from 1284 until 1291), and Valdemar Magnusson, the second duke of Finland (died 1318; duke from 1302 until 1317), both used the later Bjälbo coat of arms, which was a crowned lion rampant with three bends sinister, the main difference being that Valdemar's arms had the field strewn with hearts (Figure 3). This version of the arms was quite similar to the modern coat of arms of Finland, but the lion did not yet brandish any weapon.

== Creation ==
When John III assumed the title of "Grand Duke of Finland and Karelia", shortened to Grand Duke of Finland in 1577 (or soon thereafter), the lion became closely associated with Finland through the grand-ducal coats of arms (Figure 5). The grand-ducal coat of arms is thought to have resulted out of a combination of the Göta lion (originating from the Folkunga lion) and the coat of arms of Karelia (Figure 6). The result was that the lion brandishes one weapon and treads on another.

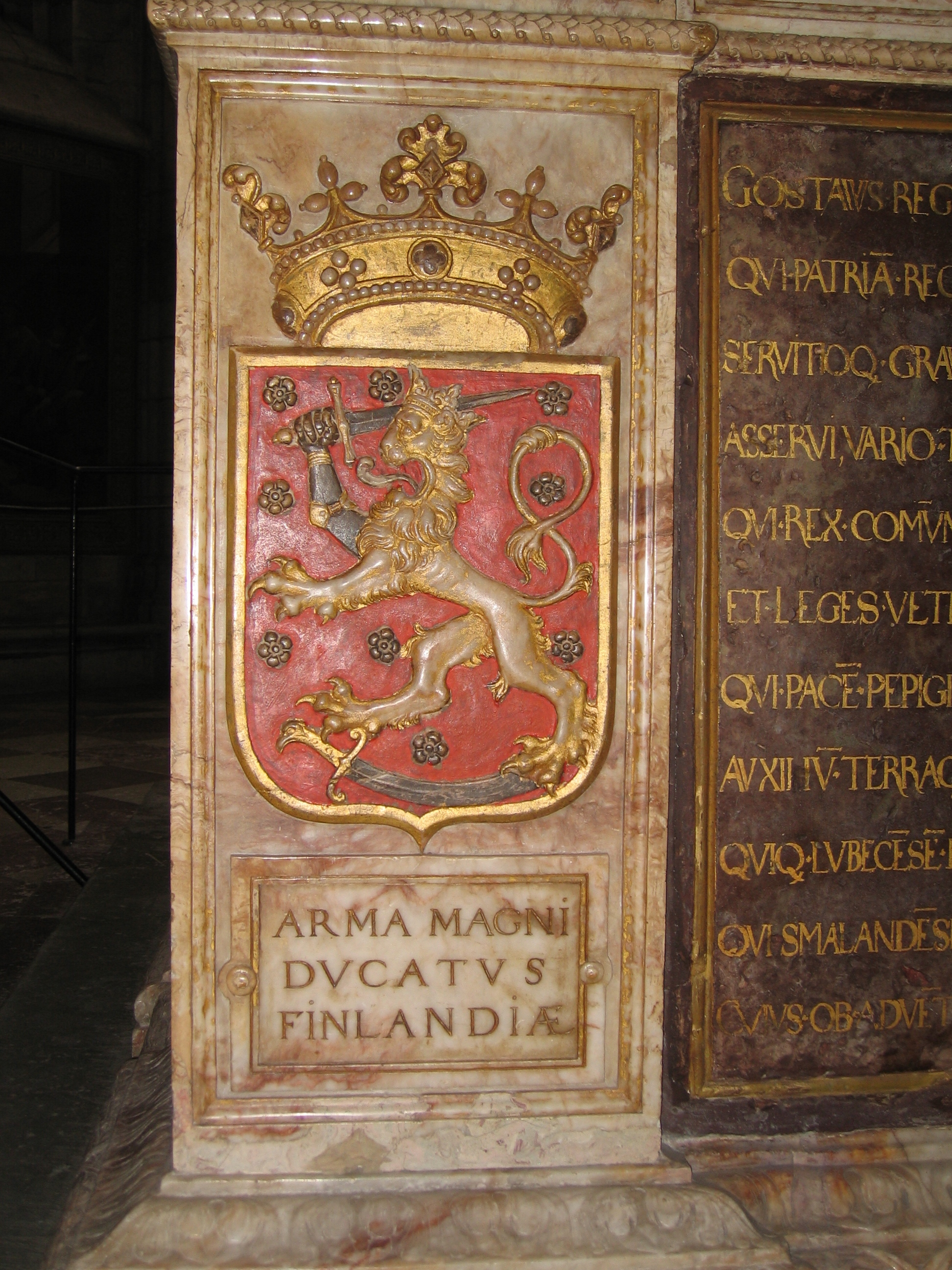
Figure 5: Grand-ducal coat of arms of Finland, tomb of King Gustav Vasa (Uppsala cathedral, Sweden)

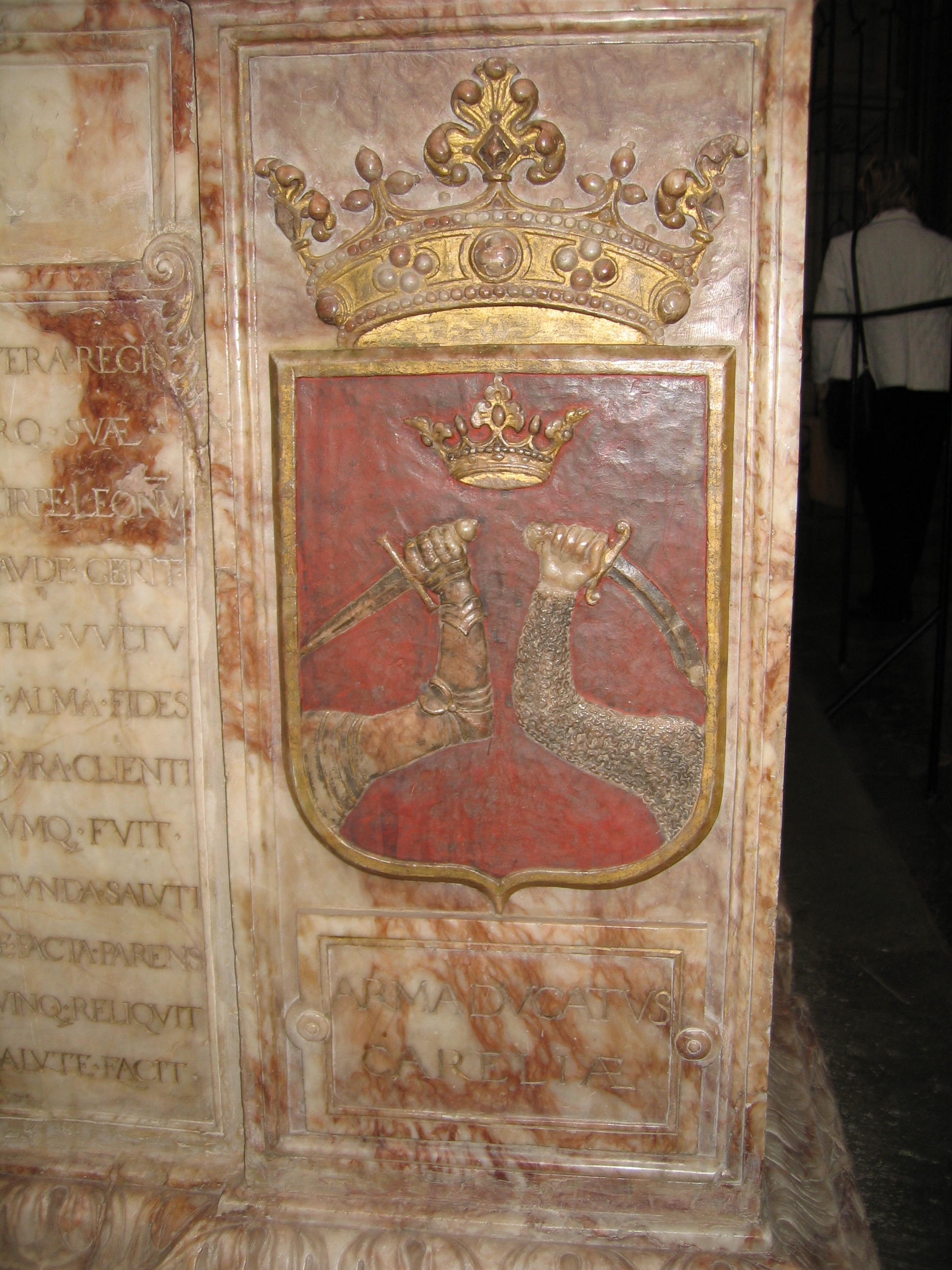
Figure 6: Coat of arms of the Province of Karelia, tomb of King Gustav Vasa (Uppsala cathedral, Sweden)

The best-known version of the grand-ducal coat of arms is found on the tomb of Gustavus I (1523–1560) in the Uppsala cathedral (Figure 5). It has been suggested that either Duke John himself, or his brother Eric XIV, was leading the design work on the heraldic signs on the tomb. Neither statement can be confirmed, but it is known that Eric XIV showed an interest in heraldry. The monument was commissioned from Guillaume Boyen (Willem Boy), a Flemish architect and sculptor who had worked in Sweden. He started on the task in Antwerp in 1562, completing it 10 years later; however, the tomb was not in place in Uppsala until the early 1580s, and the finishing work lasted until 1591. In addition to the royal arms of Sweden and those of Finland, the arms of the 11 provinces are depicted. From Finland they include North and South Finland, as well as Tavastia and Karelia. The work of Willem Boy is of exceptional quality, which is perhaps explained by the fact that lions were a dominant feature in the heraldry of Flanders, and he would therefore have had a great deal of exposure to it before receiving the commission for the tomb of Gustavus I.

The earliest known blazon from this period states that the arms of Finland represents "A crowned lion of gold holding a sword in the right forepaw and trampling with both hindpaws on a Russian sabre (ryssesabel), surrounded by nine silver roses in a red field, over the shield a golden crown with a red cap". As both King Gustavus I and his son, John III, were involved in lengthy wars with Russia, it should come as no surprise that this was a central element in the coats of arms of both the Grand Duchy of Finland and in that of Karelia (Figure 6), which symbolizes the struggle between East and West.

The purpose of the nine roses remains unknown, but are now mostly considered to be decorative only. They have sometimes been claimed to represent the nine historical provinces of Finland, but this hypothesis has not found support among prominent scholars. The number of towns in the nominal "Grand Duchy of Finland and Karelia" in 1580 was also nine, but no known historical research provides support for a link between the number of roses and the number of towns in Finland in 1580.

== Evolution ==
=== Swedish era ===
During the following centuries, the arms of Finland were to appear in different versions of varying artistic quality, and it was only in the late 19th century when the Uppsala lion was again taken into use as the prototype for the coat of arms of Finland.

The lion experienced several changes during the 17th century. In the funeral banner of Charles X Gustavus (in 1660) it can be seen treading on the sabre with all three free paws; in drawings by Elias Brenner (in the Suecia antique et hodierna by Erik Dahlberg, printed in 1716), it is pictured with a double tail (queue fourchée) and with an almost walking posture.

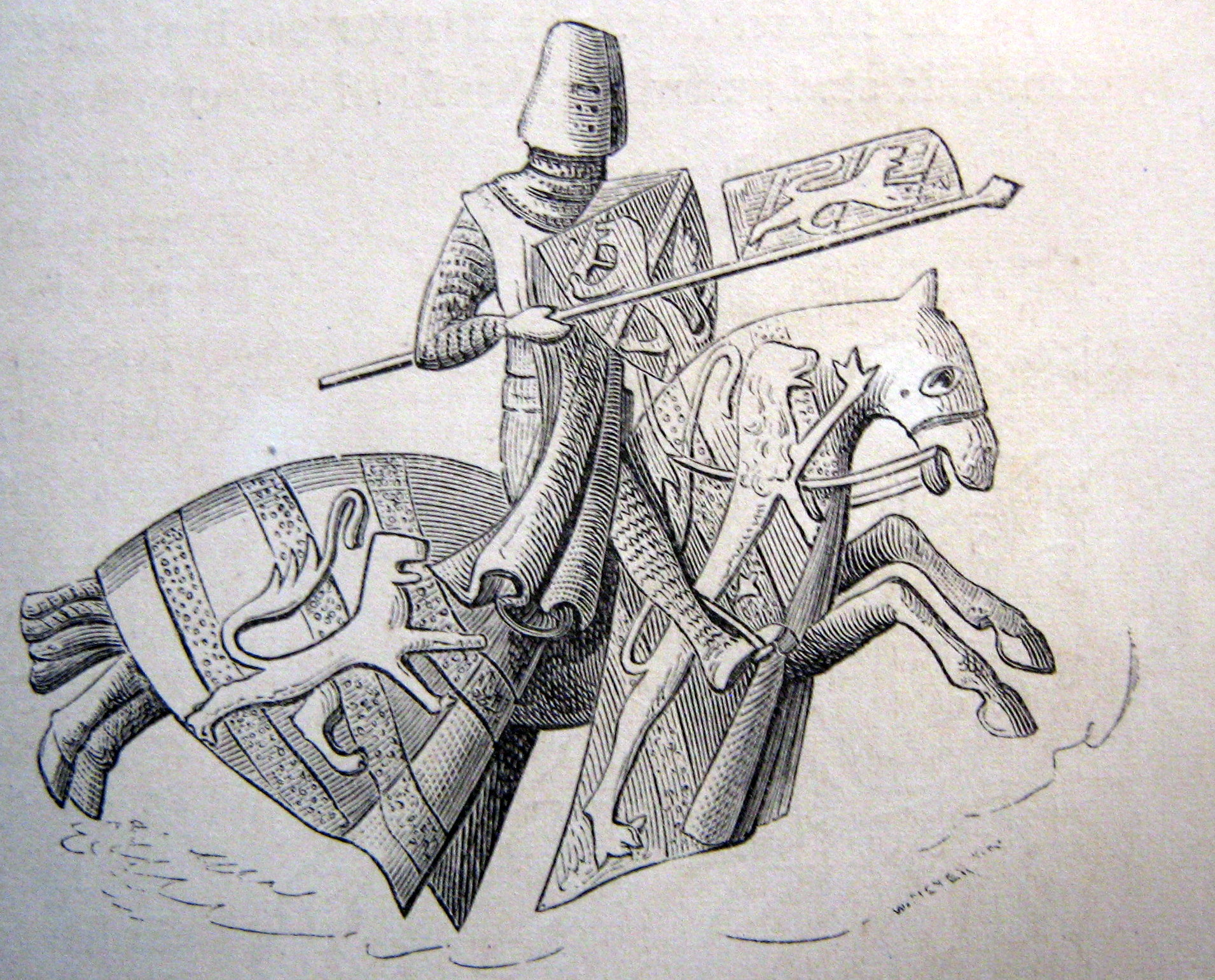
Bengt Birgersson's equipments clearly shows the lion emblem.

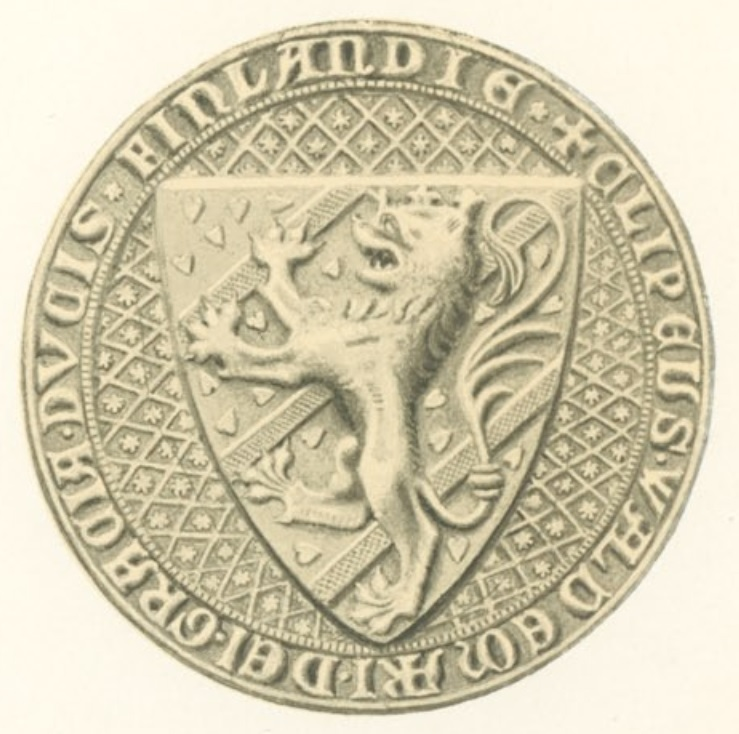
Seal of Valdemar, Duke of Finland, from the beginning of the 14th century. The seal is based on the coat of arms of the Bjälbo family.

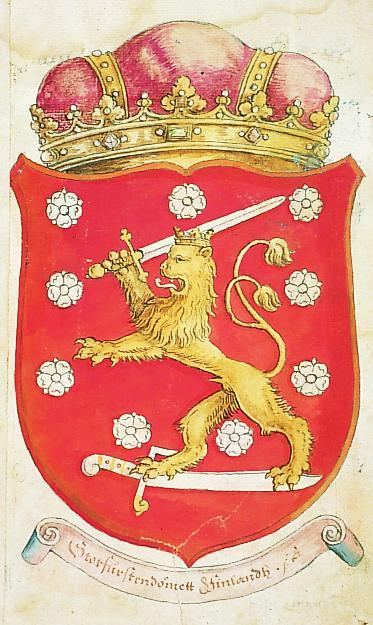
Coat of arms of Finland in the chronicle of Laurentius Petri from the 1580s.

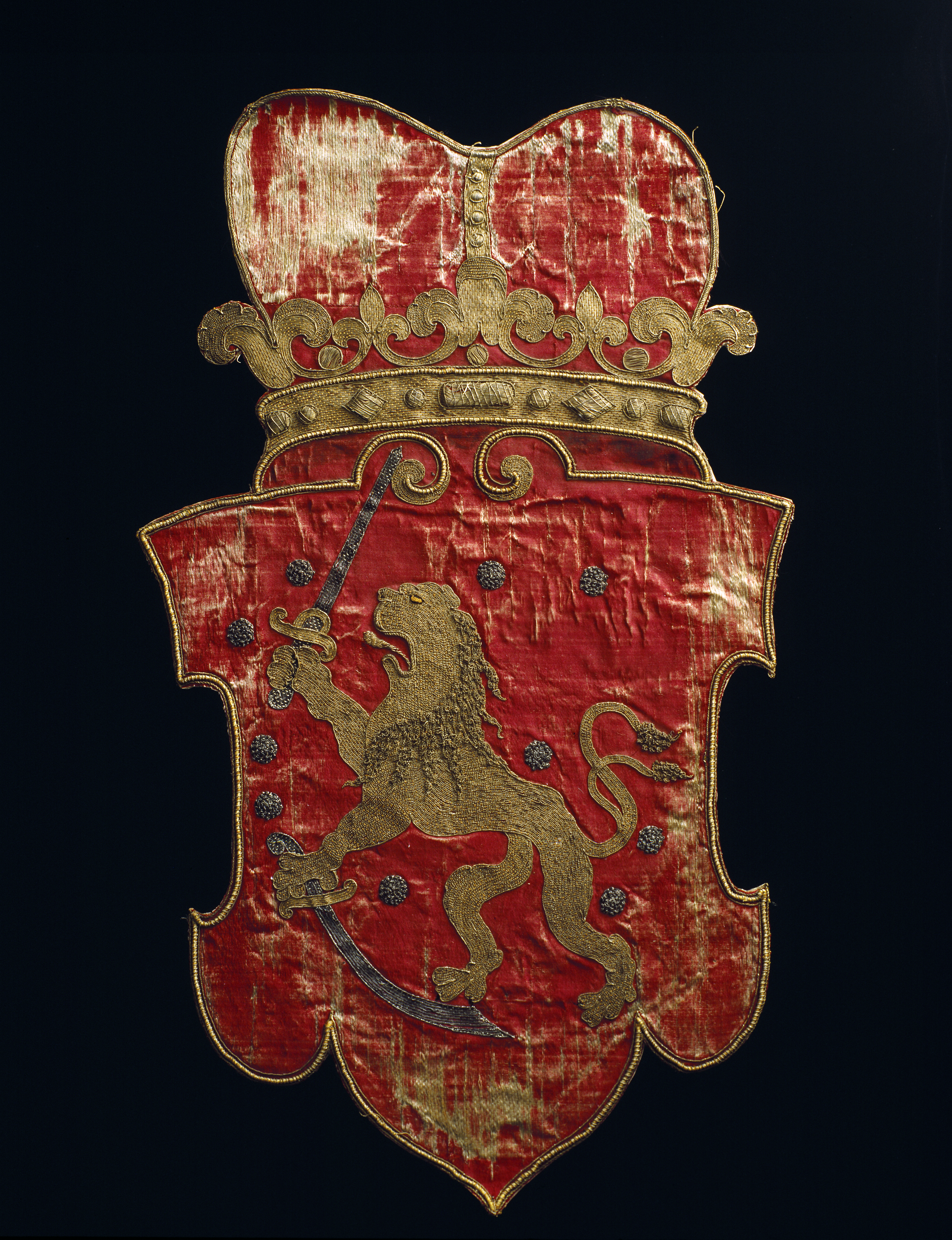
Coat of arms of Finland from the funeral procession of Gustav II Adolf from 1633.

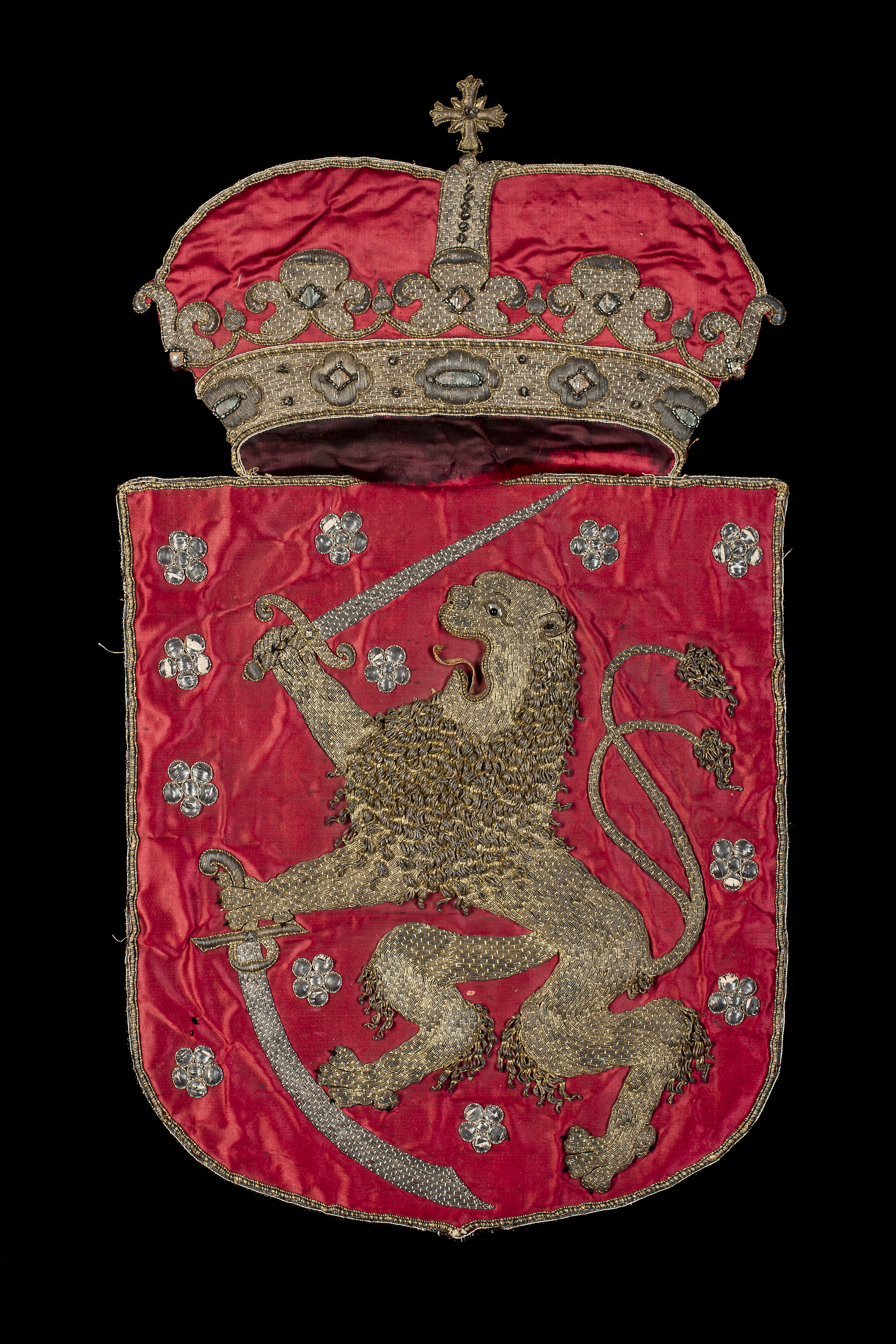
Coat of arms of Finland from 1660.

Coat of arms from 1775

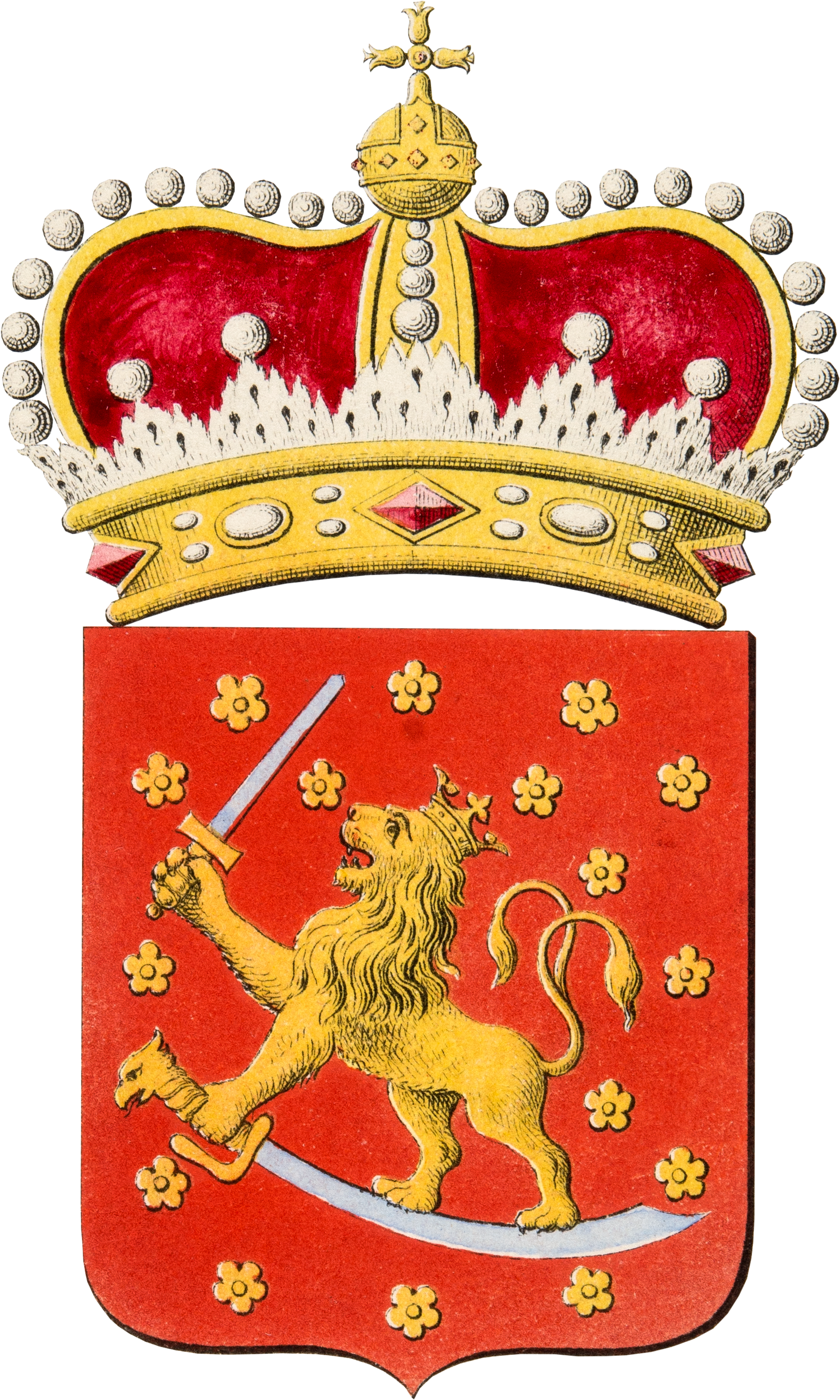
The coat of arms of Elias Brenner is the coat of arms of Finland based on the model from the end of the 17th century.

=== Grand Duchy of Finland ===
After Finland was transformed into a grand duchy (as a consequence of the Swedish–Russian War of 1808–1809), Elias Brenner's version of the lion was chosen by the authorities as the model for the new coat of arms of the Grand Duchy of Finland, an autonomous part of the Russian Empire. The blazon in the decree of 26 October 1809 states: "The shield has a red field, strewn with roses of silver, on which a golden lion with a crown of gold, standing on a silver saber, which it grasps with the left forepaw while holding in the right forepaw an upright sword". Obviously, any interpretation of the lion as "trampling on a Russian sabre" had been lost at this point in time.

During the reform of official Russian heraldry in 1857, the lion was again changed on the initiative of Baron Bernhard Karl von Köhne. The blazon states: "On a red field strewn with silver roses a crowned lion of gold, holding in the right forepaw an upright sword and in the left one a curved sword on which it rests with the right hindpaw". The main changes were that the lion had started to resemble a dog rather than a lion, and the crown on top of the shield had been changed to an arched crown without a cap, and with a small Russian eagle on the rim. The sword in the right forepaw had shrunk in size, to the point of resembling a dagger rather than a sword (Figure 8).

During the years when the Russian emperors pursued a policy of Russification (1899–1905 and 1908–1917), the use of the arms of Finland increased significantly, and eventually became popular in the broader population.

The director of the Finnish National Archives, Karl August Bomansson (1827–1906), made the first significant study on the arms of Finland in modern times. He restored the appearance of the arms in 1886, so that it closely resembled the Uppsala lion. However, there was a slight deviation on how the lion tramples on the saber, and the arched crown with the imperial eagle in the von Köhne version was replaced with a crown similar to that of a German princely crown. This version of the arms was subsequently used in the early years of Finnish independence.

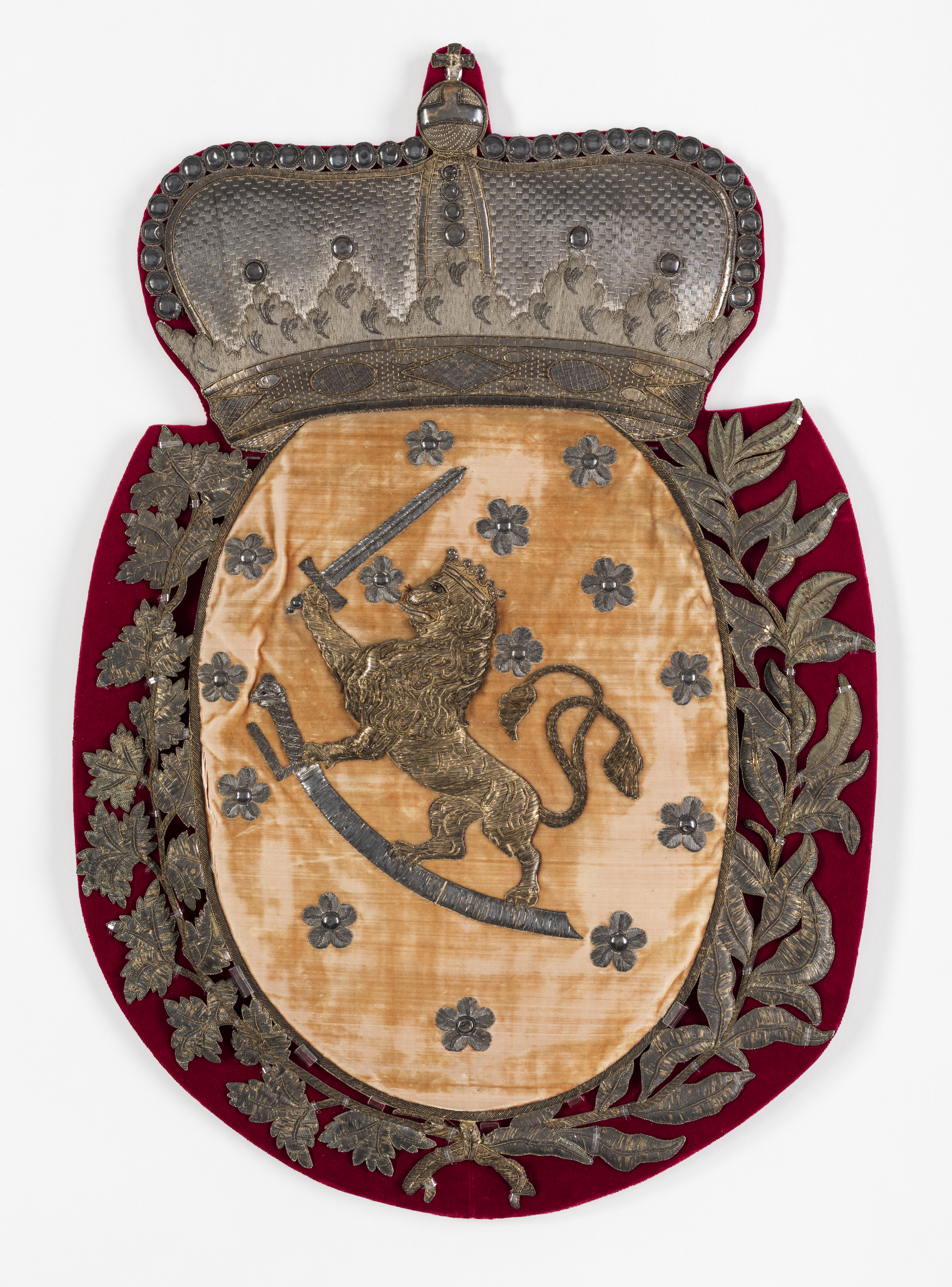
Coat of arms of Finland from the canopy of the throne of Emperor Alexander I used in the Diet of Porvoo from 1809.

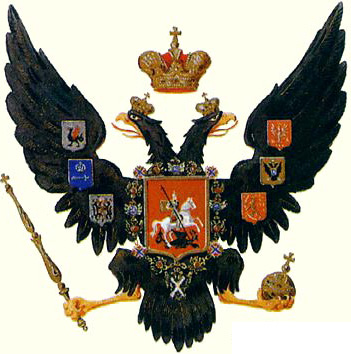
1825–1855: The coat of arms of Finland was part of the Second variant of the Russian Empire coat of arms

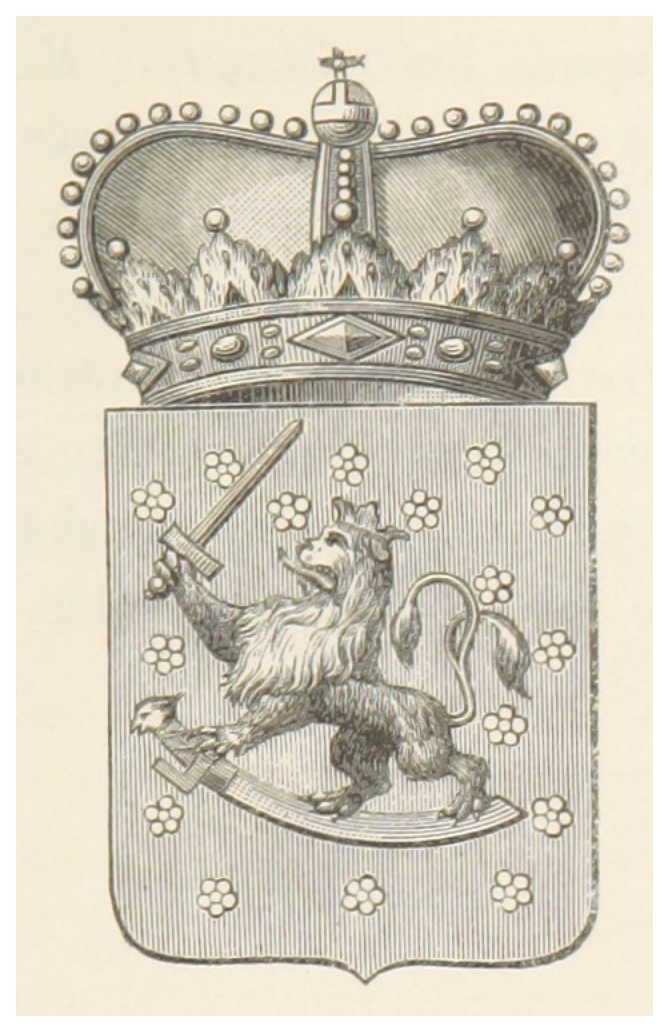
1881 version: The lion stands on three legs, 16 roses.

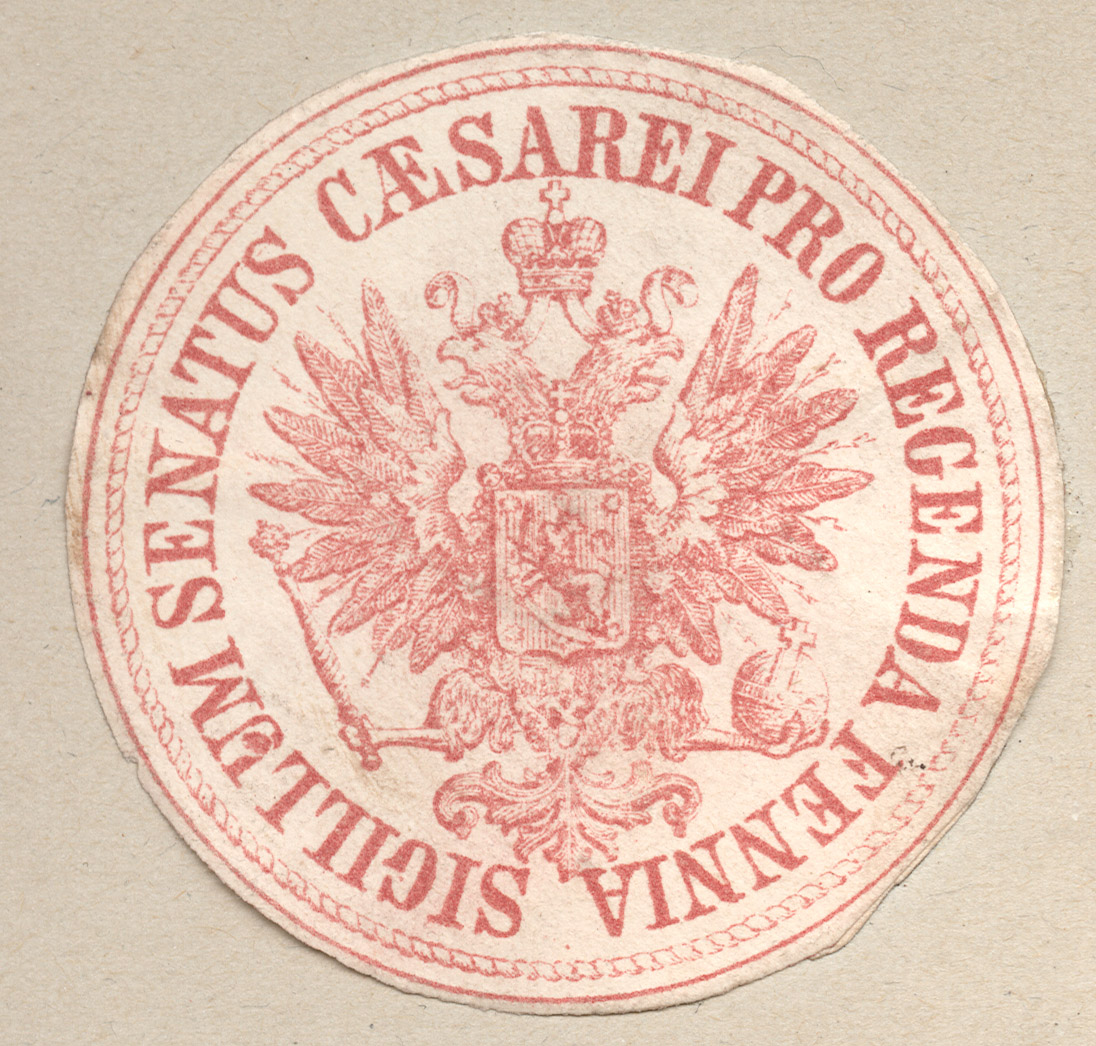
During autonomy, the coat of arms of Finland was often depicted as being supported by the double-headed eagle of Russia.

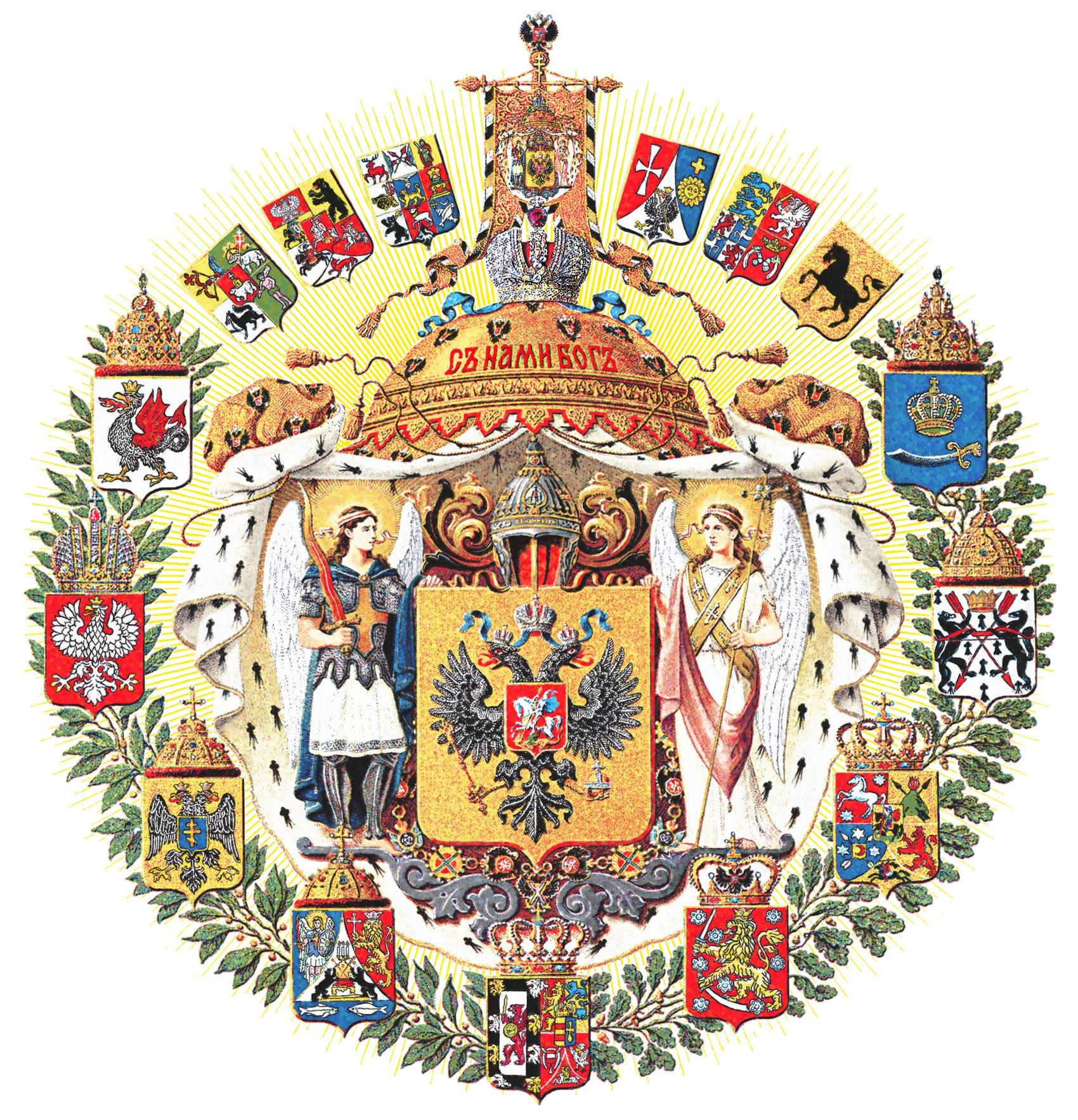
The coat of arms of Finland was part of the great coat of arms of the Russian Empire in 1882–1917.

The coat of arms of Finland depicted as being supported by the double-headed eagle of Russia. 1883

The coat of arms of Finland, which is inside the Russian double-headed eagle

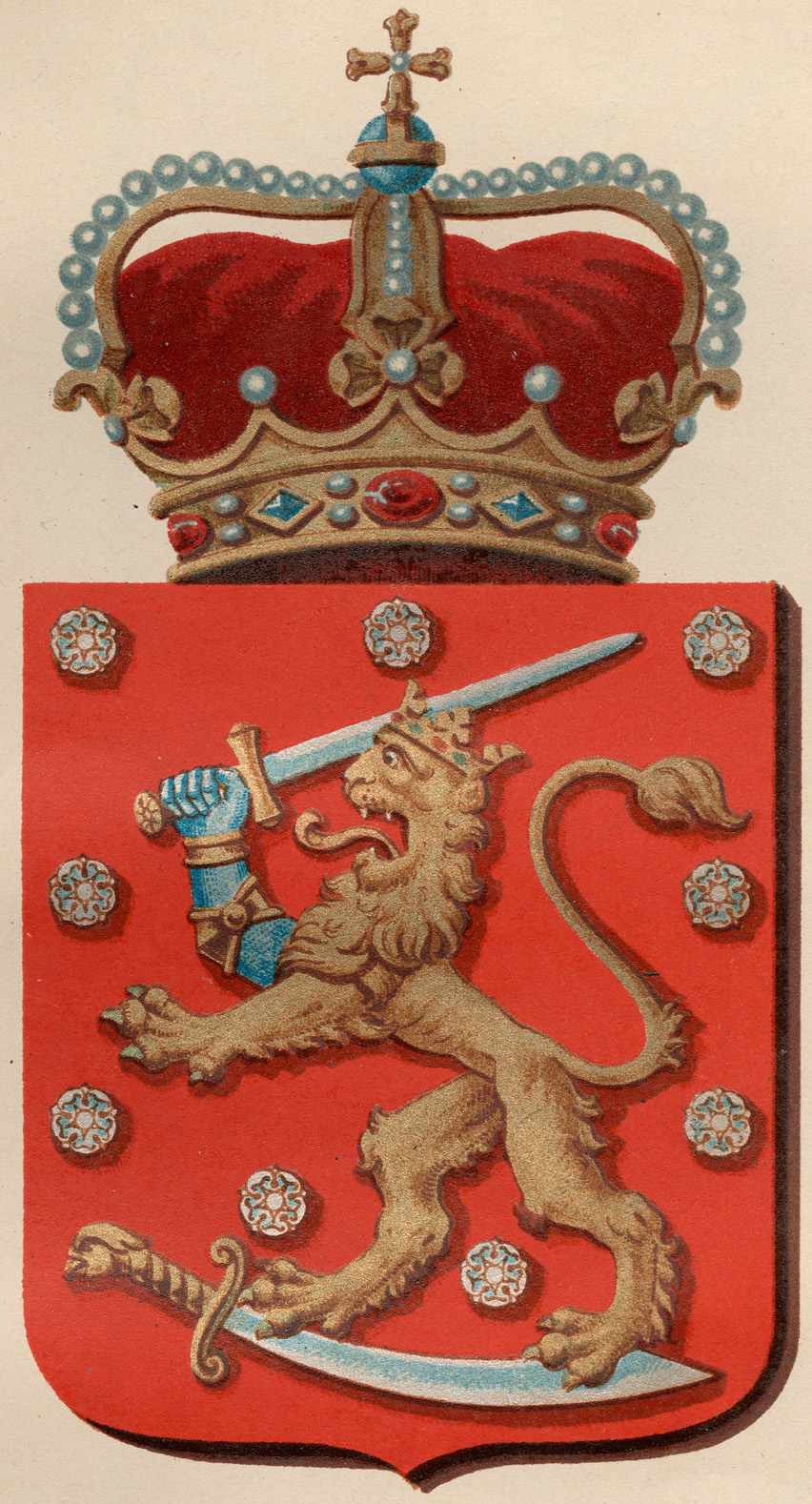
Karl Bomansson's model of the coat of arms of Finland from 1889.

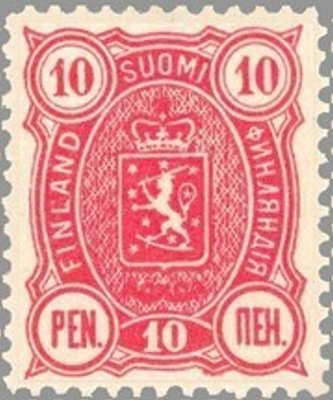
Coat of arms of Finland on the 1890 Finnish postage stamp

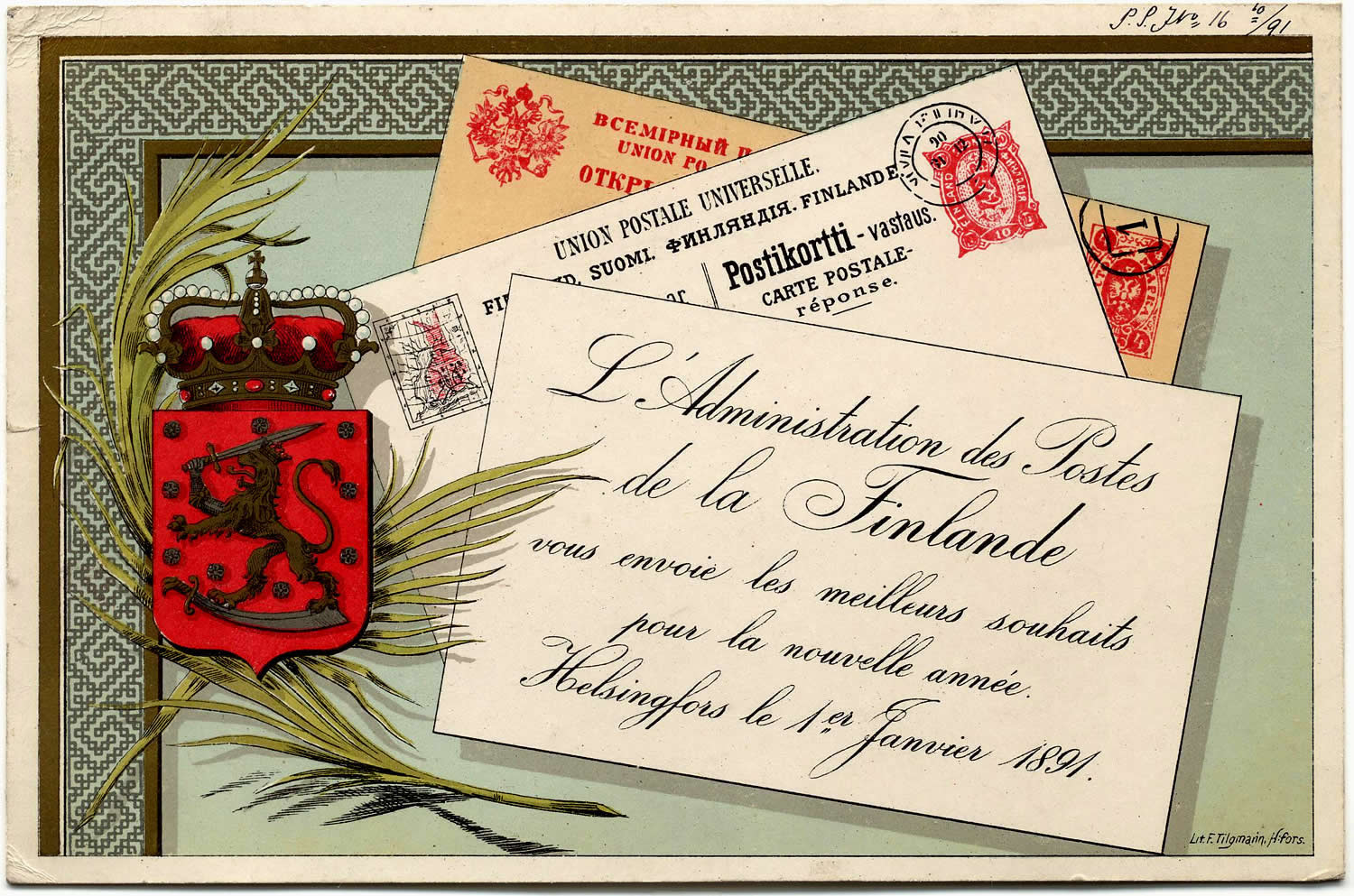
Postcard from Finland 1891

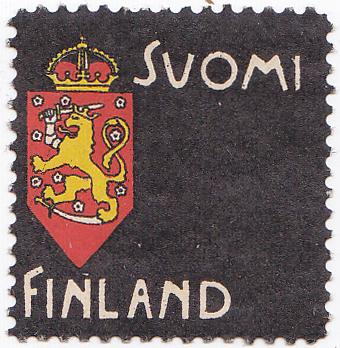
The lion coat of arms of the Gallen-Kallela mourning stamp from the first Russification period in 1900.

Coat of arms of Grand Duchy of Finland before independence

=== Early independence ===
Coat of arms of the Kingdom of Finland (1918)

During the 1920s and 1930s, the national arms became the subject of some controversy, and the debate centered on whether the lion should be replaced with a bear, which had an important place in the national folklore. Already in 1557, the bear had emerged as the emblem of Finnia Septentrionalis ("North Finland", at the time roughly the same as Satakunta and northern Southwest Finland) and continues to be used as the coat of arms of Satakunta. However, outside Finland, the bear was usually regarded as a symbol of Russia. The debate was however not settled, and throughout most of the 20th century, versions of the arms were used that closely adhered to the Uppsala lion.

In 1936, a state committee suggested a compromise that Finland should have a "greater" and a "smaller" coat of arms. The greater coat of arms was proposed to have two bears as supporters of the arms (Figure 9), with a base of spruce twigs and with the motto "vapaa, vankka, vakaa" ("free, firm, steadfast"). This would have given the bear a place in the national heraldry, but the design was never confirmed, nor was this version of the arms taken into use.

Coat of arms of 1918

Coat of arms of 1920

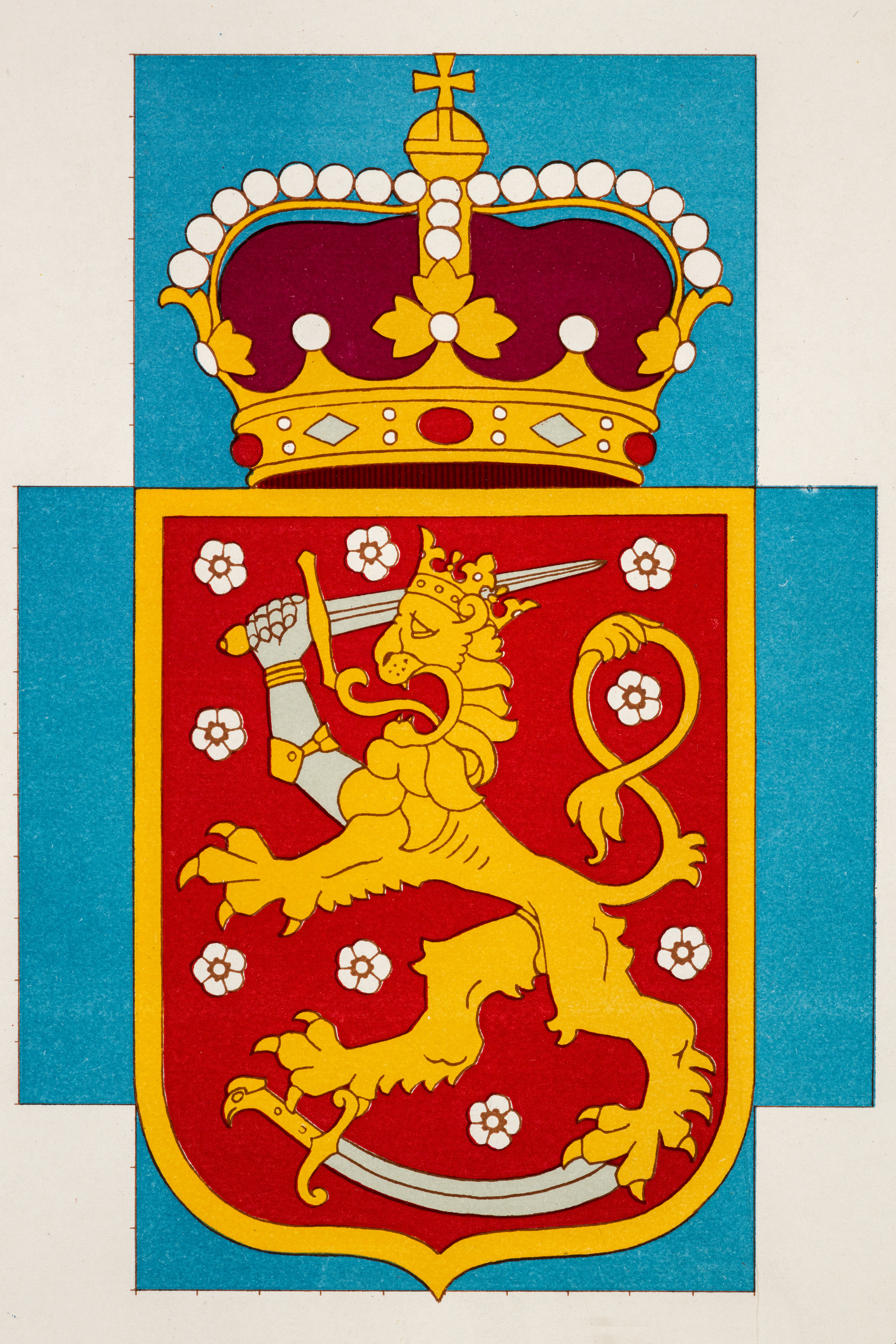
Coat of arms used in the Finnish national flag in 1918–1920

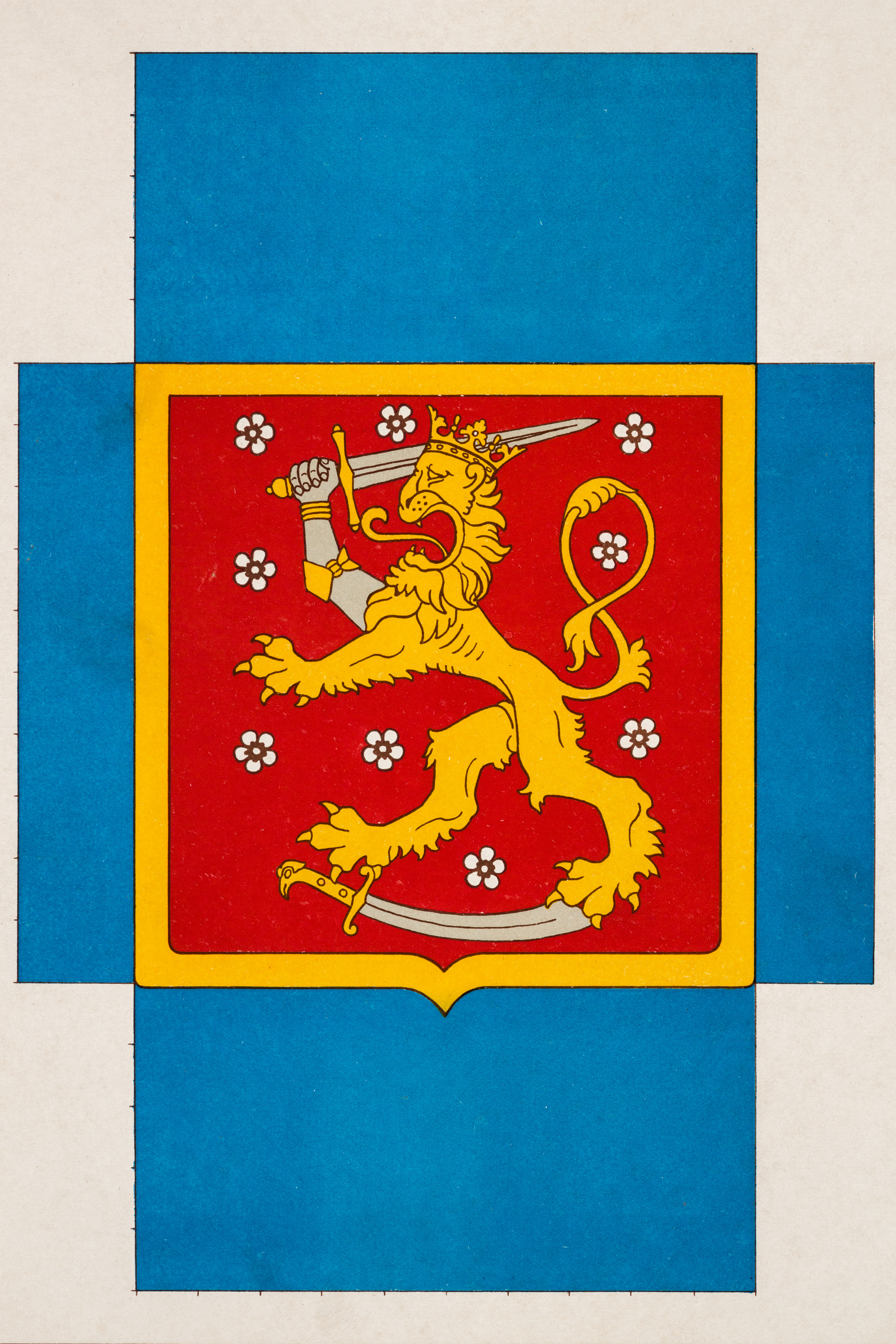
Coat of arms used in the Finnish national flag in 1920–1978

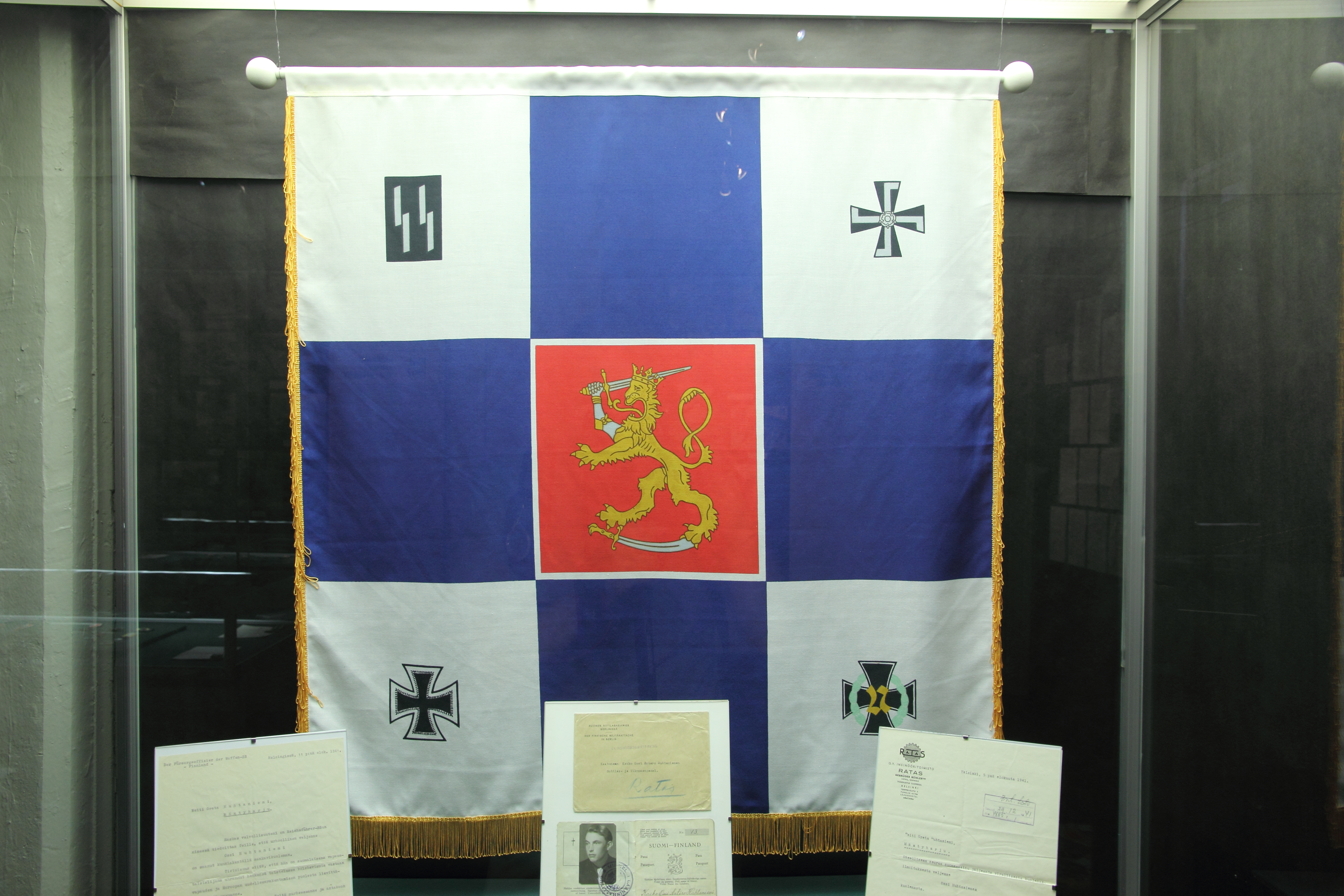
Coat of arms used in the Finnish Waffen-SS Volunteer Battalion flag in 1941–1943

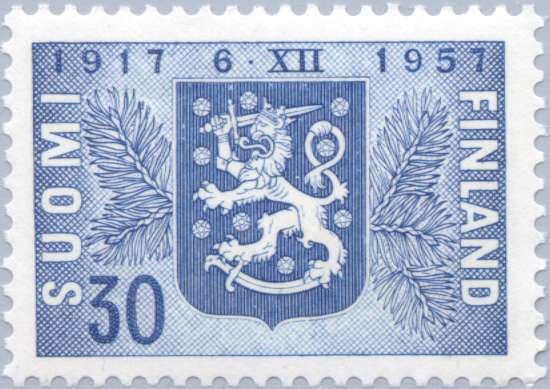
Stamp of Finland - 40th Anniversary of Independence 1957

Coat of arms used in the Finnish national flag since 1978

=== Today ===
The blazon of the national coat of arms was finally settled in 1978, when the law of 26 May 1978 (381/78) described the coat of arms as follows: "On a red field, a crowned lion, the right forepaw replaced with an armoured hand brandishing a sword, trampling on a saber with the hindpaws, the lion, crowned and armed, the weapons hilted and the armour garnished gold, the blades and the armour silver, the field strewn with nine roses of silver". (This is, however, a direct translation from Finnish; the heraldic blazon would be "Gules, a lion rampant Or crowned and armed of the same, in his dexter arm vambraced Argent garnished Or holding a sword Argent hilted and pommeled Or, trampling on a sabre Argent hilted Or; surmounted with nine roses Argent".)

The coat of arms appears on the Finnish state flag. The Finnish lion is also used in a wide variety of emblems of different state authorities, often modified to depict the duties of the unit or the authority. On the other hand, the Finnish municipalities and regions usually use heraldic motifs drawn from elsewhere, leaving the lion for state use (exceptions exist, such as the Coat of arms of Jakobstad). The Finnish lion also appears as an armed force's generals' rank insignia and in the navy as part of an officer's rank insignia.

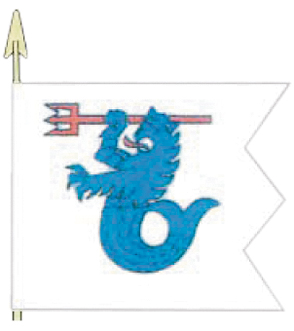
7th Missile Squadron, Finnish Navy: Finnish lion with a fish-tail and a trident

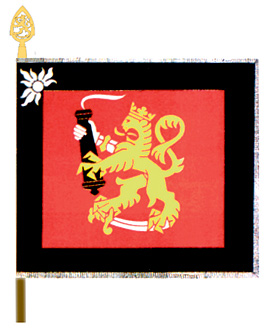
Artillery Brigade: Finnish lion holding a cannon

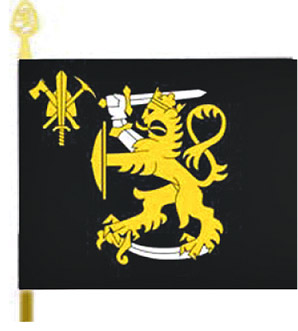
Engineering and NBC Warfare School, Finnish Army: Finnish lion holding a shield, symbolizing NBC protection.

Finnish Army: Finnish coat of arms with jaeger green escutcheon placed upon crossed swords

Finnish Navy: Coat of arms with an anchor of naval blue colour.

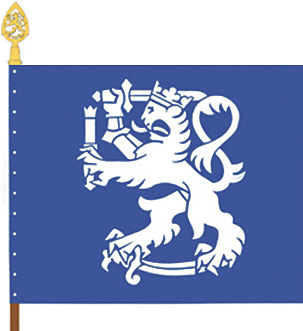
Finnish Defence Forces International Center: Finnish lion holding a herald's staff

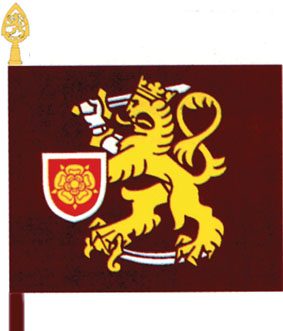
Finnish National Defence University: Finnish lion carrying a shield with the heraldic rose, the Finnish officers' rank insignia

Police of Finland: lion's head as a handle of a sword

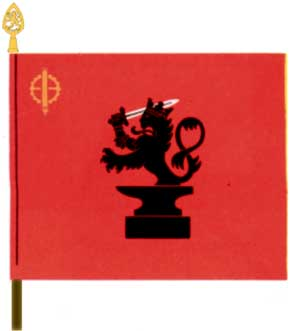
Technical Training Center, Finnish Army: Finnish lion rising from an anvil

Collar insignia of a Finnish General (branch colours of general staff)

Shoulder strap of Senior Lieutenant of the Finnish Navy

Sleeve insignia of Senior Lieutenant of the Finnish Navy

=== Proposed coat of arms ===
Rudolf Ray's proposal

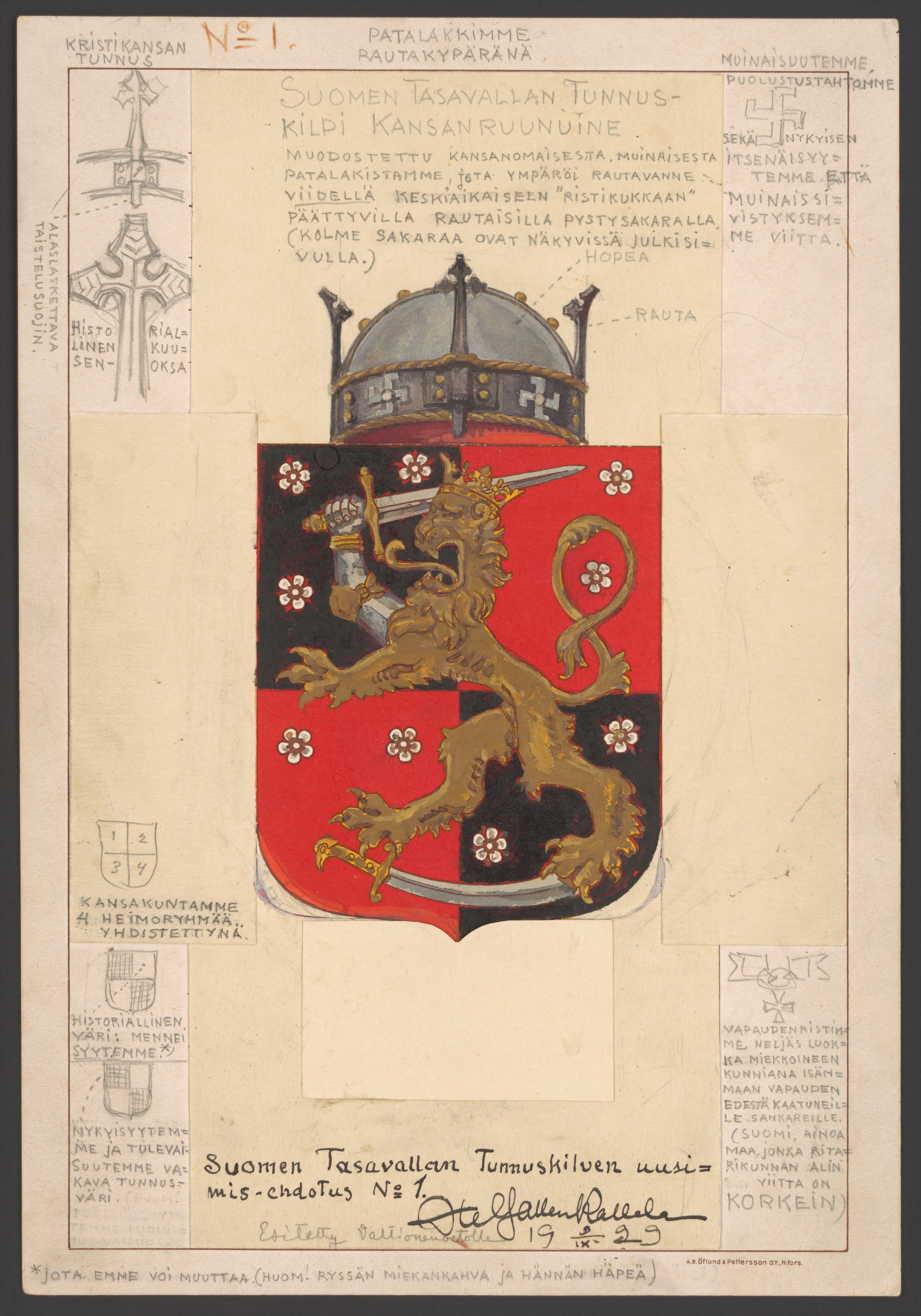
Akseli Gallen-Kallela's proposal

Drafts for proposed greater coat of arms of Finland

== See also ==
- Flag of Finland
- Finnish national symbols
- Armorial of sovereign states

== Bibliography ==
- Talvio, Tuukka. The Lion of Finland. ISBN 951-616-040-9.
