= Riksarkivet =

Riksarkivet may refer to:

- National Archives of Sweden
- National Archives of Norway
- National Archives of Finland (in Finnish 'Kansallisarkisto')

== See also ==
- Danish National Archives (Danish: 'Rigsarkivet')
