= Tuomo Polvinen =

Finnish historian (1931–2022)

Tuomo Ilmari Polvinen (2 December 1931 – 22 January 2022) was a Finnish historian.

== Biography ==
Polvinen was born in Helsinki on 2 December 1931. He became a PhD in 1964. He was an official (1957–1961) in the Finnish national archives in Helsinki, and (1970–74) its chief. 1968-70 he was professor in general history at Tampere University and (1974–1992) professor on the subject at Helsinki University; research professor (1979–1989) and (1992–1995).

He focused on the relations between Finland and Russia/Soviet Union. Amongst Polvinen's works are Suomi suurvaltain politiikassa 1941-44, which is about Finland in the context of great power politics, Venäjän vallankumous ja Suomi 1917-1920 (2 parts, 1967–71), which is about Russian revolution and Finland, Between East and West (1986), furthermore a work on Bobrikov as governor general in Finland, Imperial borderland (1995) and a great biography in five parts about president J. K. Paasikivi.

Polvinen died on 22 January 2022, at the age of 90.
