= Kaarlo Blomstedt =

Finnish historian and archivist

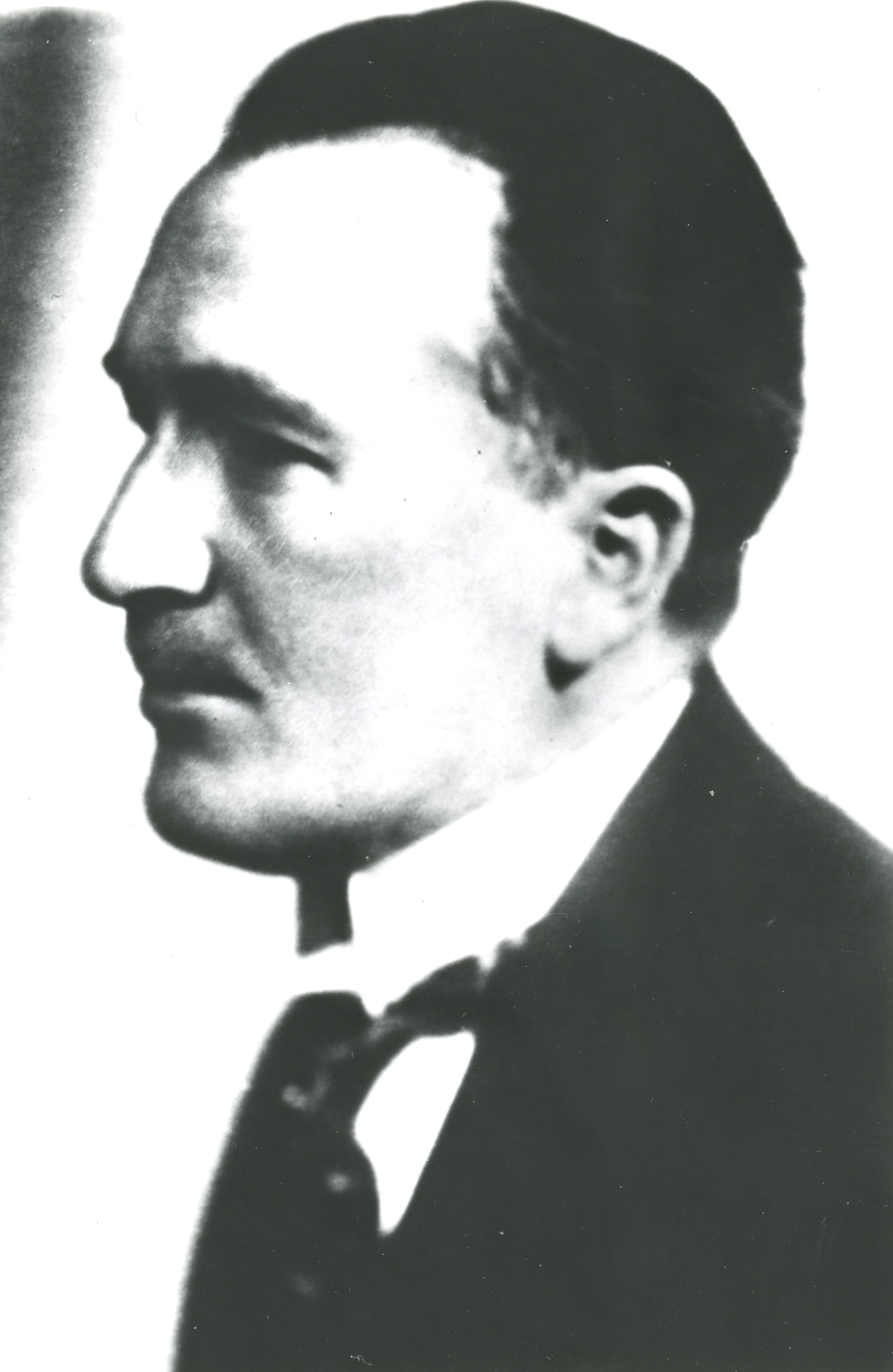

Kaarlo Viljanti Blomstedt PhD (17 May 1880 in Hämeenlinna – 27 February 1949 in Helsinki), was a Finnish historian and archivist. Blomstedt organized the Finnish archives and functioned as an official at the National Archives of Finland from 1908 and became its chief in 1927. He was chairman of the delegation of archives 1928−1946, when the archives of Finnish landscapes was created. Blomstedt was also associate professor in history at Helsinki University between 1921 and 1933 and editor in chief for the biographical encyclopedia Kansallisen elämäkerraston 1928–1934.

He has mainly written on the Horn family and Finland's 16th century history.
