= Finnish national symbols =

Finnish national symbols are natural symbols or Finnish national works and prominent figures that are commonly associated with Finland. The most recognized national symbols include the flag of Finland and the lion featured on the Finnish coat of arms.

== National symbols ==
Type	Symbol	Image
National flag	Finnish flag	
Coat of arms	Finnish coat of Arms	
National epic	Kalevala	
National anthem	fi: Maamme, sv: Vårt land	
National day	Finnish independence day	
National food	Rye bread	
National instrument	Kantele	
National personification	The Maiden of Finland	
National shrine	Turku Cathedral (unofficial)	
National sport	Pesäpallo ("Finnish baseball")	

== National symbols from nature ==
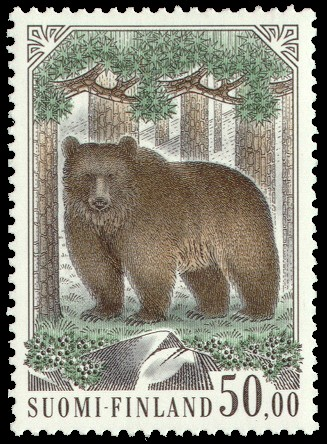
Stamp featuring the brown bear, the national animal

Type	Symbol	Image
National animal	Bear	
National horse	Finnhorse	
National insect	Seven-spot ladybird	
National fish	European perch	
Floral emblem	Lily of the valley	
National stone	Granite	
National dog	Finnish Spitz	
National bird	Whooper swan	
National butterfly	Holly blue	
National tree	Silver birch	

== Prominent national figures ==
Figure	Name	Image
National saint	Bishop Henry	
National poet	J. L. Runeberg and Eino Leino	
National philosopher	J. V. Snellman	
National writer	Aleksis Kivi	
National composer	Jean Sibelius	
National artist	Akseli Gallen-Kallela	
National architect and designer	Alvar Aalto	

== See also ==
- Finlandia
- Björneborgarnas marsch
- Sisu
- Folklore of Finland
- National landscapes of Finland
