= Kari Tarkiainen =

Finnish historian and archivist (born 1938)

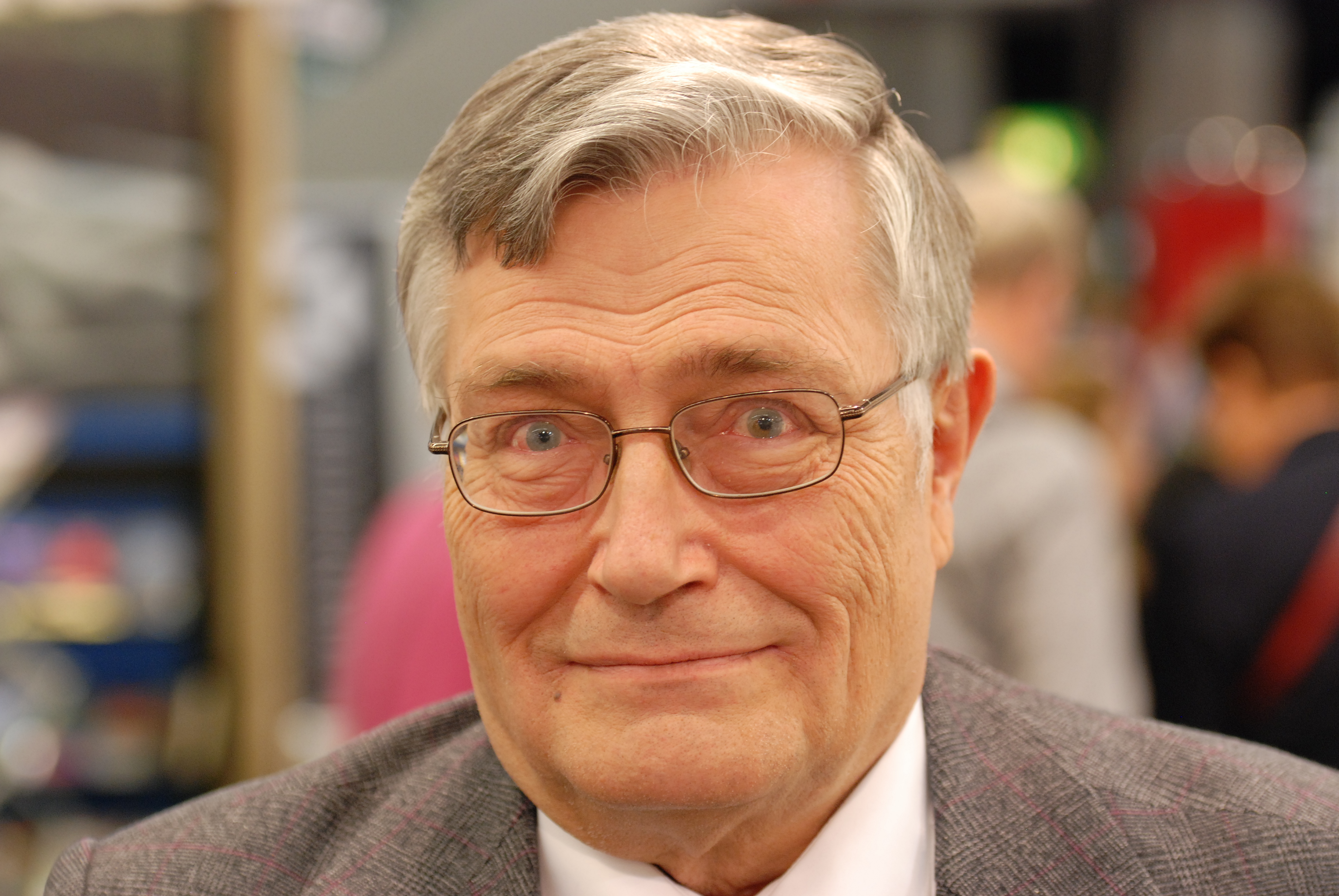
Kari Tarkiainen at Göteborg Book Fair 2013.

Kari Valtteri Tarkiainen (born 14 June 1938 in Helsinki) is a Finnish historian and archivist, who served as the national archivist of Finland from 1996 to 2003. He is a grandson of the scholar Viljo Tarkiainen and his wife, writer Maria Jotuni.

Tarkiainen has had a career in the world of archives both in Finland and Sweden. From 1971 he was employed in the Swedish National Archives in Stockholm. He finished his career as archivist in Helsinki as chief of the National Archives of Finland 1996–2003.

Tarkiainen received his PhD degree in 1974, having written his dissertation on the view of Russia in Sweden during the early great power era. He is a specialist in medieval history, and has formed the conception of the Finnish reformer Mikael Agricola. Amongst his most important works are a history of Finnish migration to Sweden, Finnarnas historia i Sverige 1-2 (1990–93), and Sveriges Österland från forntiden till Gustav Vasa (2008), which concerns the central issues of Finland's history, with special focus on the relations between Finnish and Swedish language, economy, settlement, church organisation, administration, and cultural forms. Tarkiainen has also written the biography Paavo Haavikko, modernisternas furste (1997).

Tarkiainen's wife Ülle Tarkiainen (née Liitoja) is an Estonian historian.

== Bibliography ==
- De ryska "nationalegenskaperna" enligt svensk uppfattning i början av 1600-talet (1973)
- "Vår gamble arffiende ryssen". Synen på Ryssland i Sverige 1595-1621 och andra studier kring den svenska Rysslandsbilden från tidigare stormaktstid (1974)
- Förvaringsmedel för arkivhandlingar (1975)
- Sveriges pressarkiv idag (1978)
- Finskt författningstryck från den svenska tiden (1980)
- Porvoon piispa Magnus Jacob Alopaeus 1743-1818 (1985)
- Viljo Tarkiainen - suomalainen humanisti (1988)
- Riksarkivet (1995)
- Finnarnas historia i Sverige (3 volumes) (1990–1996)
- Paavo Haavikko – modernisternas furste. Lyriken 1951–1966 (1997)
- Mitt, sa finnen om Stockholm (1997)
- Sverige och Finland (2000)
- Sveriges Österland från forntiden till Gustav Vasa (2008)
- Provinsen bortom havet. Estlands svenska historia 1561–1710 (2013)
