= Toivo Paloposki =

Finnish archivist and historian

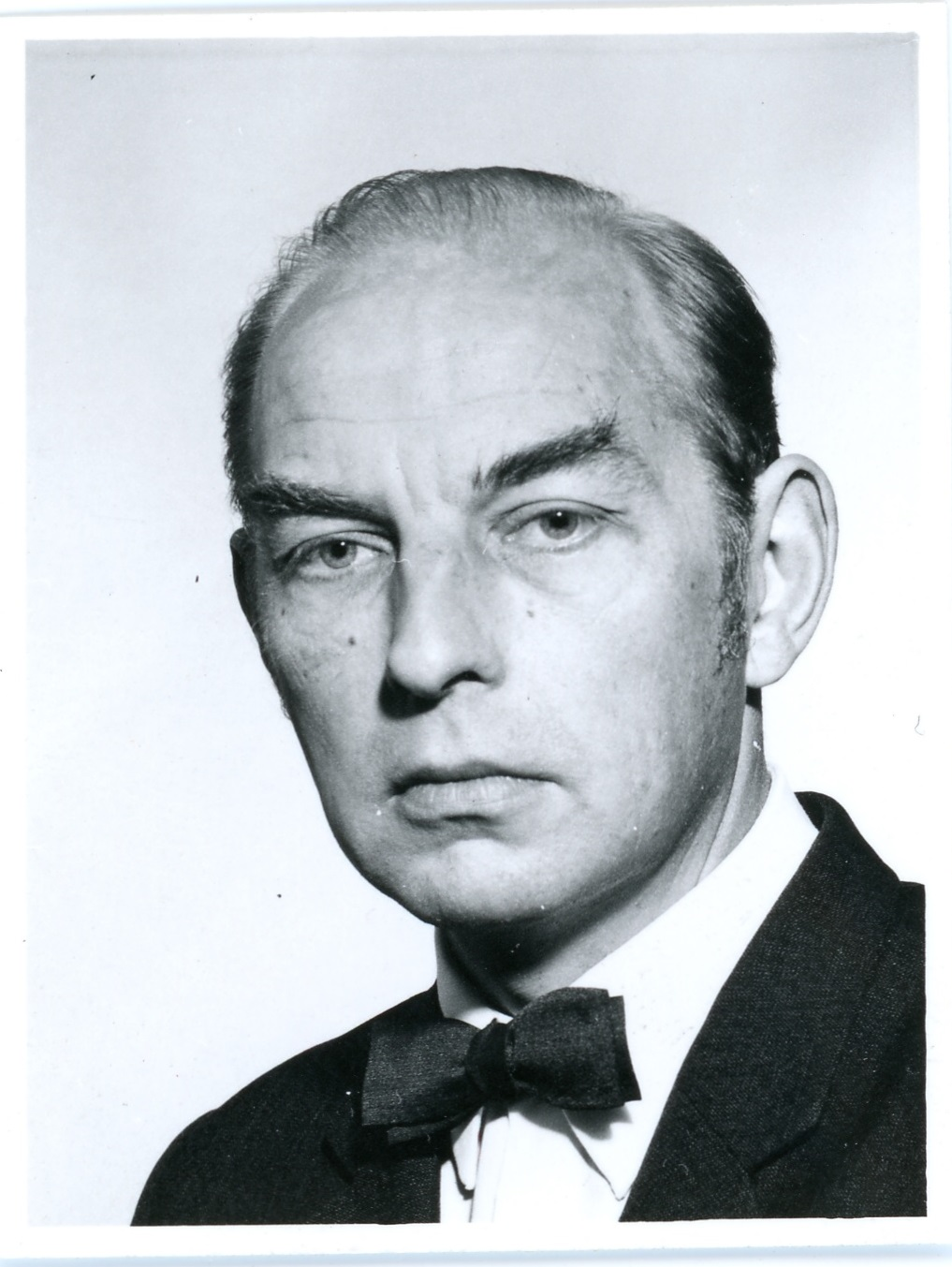
Toivo Paloposki in 1974.

Toivo Johannes Paloposki (3 April 1928 in Terijoki – 24 January 1991 in Kirkkonummi) was a Finnish archivist and historian.

Paloposki focused on Finland's 18th-century history and treated also economic-historical issues. Amongst his works are Suomen historian lähteet (1972), which is a basic work on sources of Finland's history, and some local historical works. He was director of the National Archives of Finland in 1974–1987.
