= Maria Jotuni =

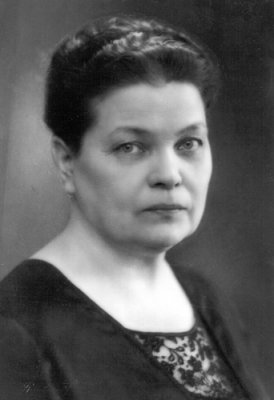
- Maria Jotuni in 1930
- Born: Maria Gustaava Jotuni; 9 April 1880; Kuopio, Finland
- Died: 30 September 1943 (aged 63); Helsinki, Finland

Maria Gustaava Jotuni (Haggrén until 1906, Jotuni-Tarkiainen from 1911, born 9 April 1880 Kuopio, died 30 September 1943 in Helsinki) was a Finnish author and a playwright.

== Life ==
Jotuni went to an all-girls school in Kuopio. She graduated in 1900 and planned to become a teacher. In 1900–1904 she studied history and literature at the University of Helsinki. Jotuni met her future husband, the literary critic Viljo Tarkiainen (1879–1951), in the university, and they got married in 1911. They had two sons: Jukka Tarkiainen and Tuttu Tarkiainen.

She is sometimes considered an early feminist, and according to Jukka's son Kari Tarkiainen, her posthumously published novel Huojuva talo ("Tottering House") was based on her marriage to his grandfather; it depicts the husband as nightmarishly abusive.

She started working as a journalist in a student magazine at the University of Helsinki. Maria Haggrén changed her surname to Jotuni in 1906. "Jotuni" means a giant in Scandinavian mythology. She died of heart disease in Helsinki.

In 1961 The Golden Calf, a film based on her play of the same name was released.

== Works ==
Plays:

- Vanha koti (1910: "The Old Home")
- Miehen kylkiluu (1914: "The Man's Rib")
- Savu-uhri (1915: "Smoke Sacrifice")
- Kultainen vasikka (1918: "The Golden Calf")
- Tohvelisankarin rouva (1924: "The Hen-Pecked Husband's Wife")
- Olen syyllinen (1929: "I am Guilty")
- Kurdin prinssi (1932: "The Kurd Prince")
- Klaus, Louhikon herra (1942: "Klaus, Master of Louhikko")

Novels:

- Arkielämää (1909: "Ordinary Life")
- Huojuva talo (1936, published 1963 posthumously. Depicts contemporary literary ideas, realism and Tolstoyism. Adapted for the Finnish stage by Maaria Koskiluoma in 1983; Koskiluoma's stage adaptation was translated into English as Tottering House by Douglas Robinson for the Frank Theatre in Minneapolis in 1994.)
- Äiti ja poika. Elämän hiljaisina hetkinä (1965: "Mother and Son: In Life's Quiet Moments")
- Norsunluinen laulu (1947, posthumous: "Ivory Song")
- Jäähyväiset (1949, posthumous: "Farewell").

Short stories:

- Suhteita (1905: "Relationships")
- Rakkautta (1907: "Love")
- Kun on tunteet (1913: "Since There Are Feelings")
- Martinin rikos (1914: "Martin's Crime")
- Jussi ja Lassi (1921: "Jussi and Lassi")
- Tyttö ruusutarhassa (1927: "The Girl in the Rose Garden")

Collection of other works:

- Kootut teokset I–IV (1930: "Collected Works I-IV")
- Valitut teokset (1954: "Selected Works")
- Maria Jotunin aforismit (1959: "MJ's Aphorisms")
- Novellit ja muuta proosaa I–II (edited by Irmeli Niemi, Otava, 1980: "Short Stories and Other Prose, I-II")
- Näytelmät (edited by Irmeli Niemi. Otava, 1981: "Plays")
- Kun on tunteet, Tyttö ruusutarhassa ynnä muita novelleja edited by Irmeli Niemi, SKS, 1999, 262 pages, ISBN 951-746-125-9 ("Since There Are Feelings, The Girl in the Rose Garden, and Other Short Stories")
