= Gallen-Kallela =

Gallen-Kallela is a surname. Notable people with the surname include:

- Akseli Gallen-Kallela (1865–1931), Finnish painter
- Jorma Gallen-Kallela (1898–1939), Finnish artist
- Janne Sirén (also known as Janne Gallen-Kallela-Sirén, born 1970), Finnish historian and museum director
