= Bobrikov =

Bobrikov (masculine, Russian: Бобриков) or Bobrikova (feminine, Russian: Бобрикова) is a Russian surname. Notable people with the surname include:

- Nikolay Bobrikov (1839–1904), Russian general and politician
- Georgy Bobrikov (1840–1924), Russian military commander
