= Karl Bomansson =

Finnish historian and archivist

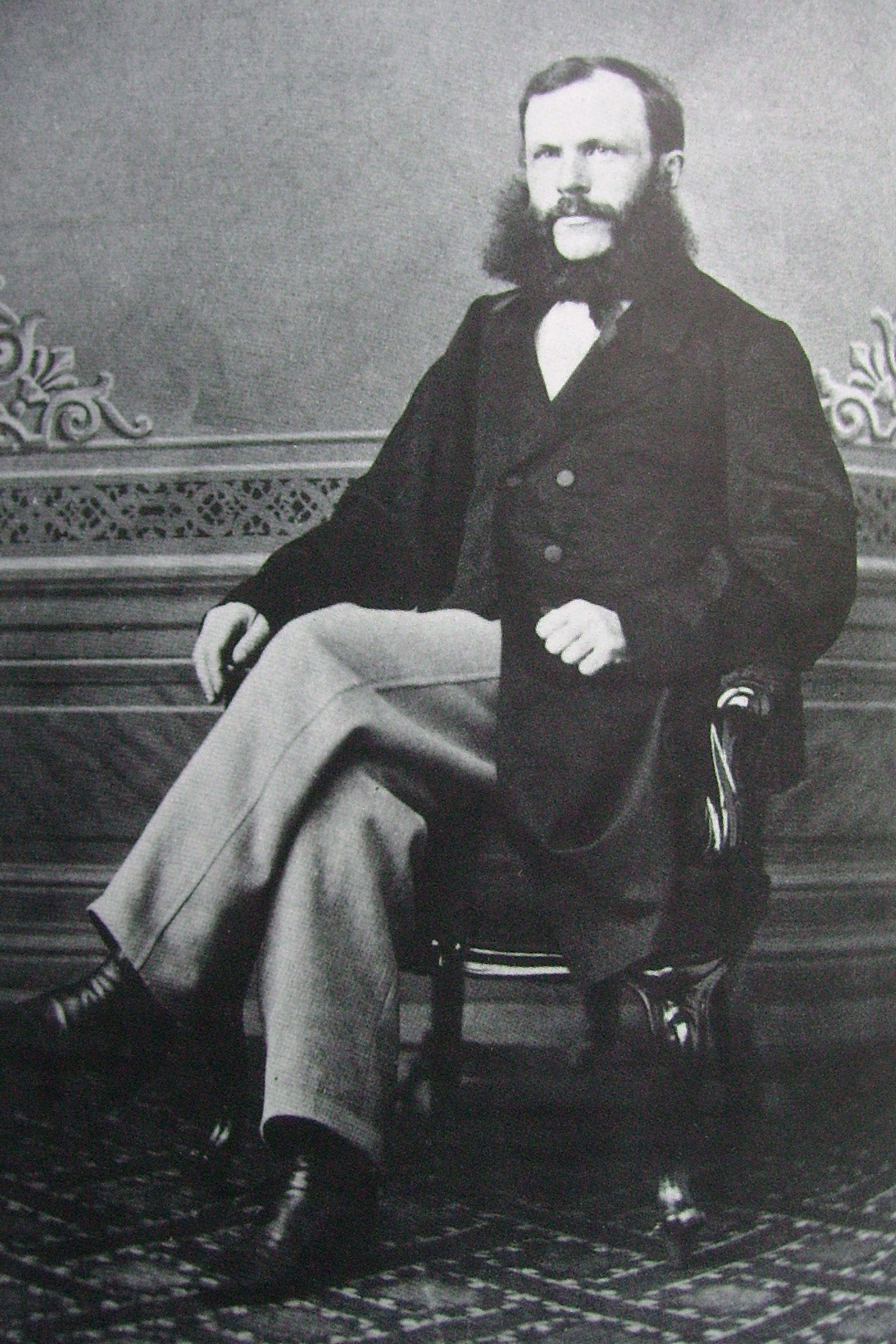
- Born: Karl August Bomansson; 5 April 1827; Saltvik, Grand Duchy of Finland
- Died: 7 February 1906 (aged 78); Helsinki, Grand Duchy of Finland
- Occupation(s): Historian and archivist

Karl August Bomansson (5 April 1827 in Saltvik – 7 February 1906 in Helsinki), was a Finnish historian and archivist. Between 1870 and 1883 he was chief archivist at the National Archives of Finland. From 1862 he was associate professor in history at Helsinki University.

In 1853 he was organizing the Finnish senates archives, and modernizing it into better standards. As a man of science he was foremost interested in the history of Åland. He wrote Kastelholm (1856), and Om Ålands folkminnen (1859), which was the first work on the archaeological subject in Finland. Bomansson took part in the excavations in Kökar in 1867. His assistant was then Johan Reinhold Aspelin.

== Publications ==
- Skildring af Folkrörelsen på Åland, 1808. En scen ur Suomis sista strid. Med en öfversigt af Åland i Allmänhet (1852) Stockholm
- Kastelholm (1856) Helsingförs (with Henrik August Reinholm)
- Om Ålands folkminnen (1858) Helsingförs
