= Flag of Caithness =

Flag of Scottish county

Caithness
- Proportion: 3:5
- Adopted: 26 January 2016
- Design: Sable, a Nordic cross Azure fimbriated Or, and on a canton a galley proper Or charged with a raven sable
- Designed by: Andrea Merchant and Niall Smith

The Caithness flag is the flag of the county of Caithness. It was registered with the Flag Institute as the official flag of the county in 2016. The flag was adopted following a competition arranged by the Highland Council. It was unveiled by the Lord Lyon, Dr Joseph Morrow, at a ceremony in Caithness House, Wick on 26 January 2016. The Nordic cross design symbolises the ancient ties of the county to the Vikings. The black recalls the county's geology with the famous Caithness flagstone, while the gold and blue allude to the beaches and sea reinforcing the maritime nature of the county and its heritage. The traditional emblem of Caithness, a galley, is placed in the first quarter, with a raven upon its sail as it appears in the county's civic arms.

== Design ==
The flag is a Nordic cross, with a galley, a traditional symbol of Caithness, in the canton with a raven upon its sail. The blue and yellow of the cross represent the beaches and seas of the county, while the black represents Caithness flagstone. The flag is in a 3:5 ratio.

=== Colours ===
The colours are the following:

Scheme	Black	Gold	Blue	White	Grey	Navy	Red
Pantone (Paper)	Black	123 C	300 C	White	422 C	433 C	485 C
Web colours	#000000	#FFC72C	#005EB8	#FFFFFF	#9EA2A2	#1D252D	#DA291C
RGB	0, 0, 0	255, 199, 44	0, 94, 184	255, 255, 255	158, 162, 162	29, 37, 45	218, 41, 28
CMYK	0%, 0%, 0%, 100%	0%, 22%, 83%, 0%	100%, 49%, 0%, 28%	0%, 0%, 0%, 0%	2%, 0%, 0%, 36%	36%, 18%, 0%, 82%	0%, 81%, 87%, 15%

== History ==
=== 2015 competition ===
Caithness was the first mainland Scottish county to adopt an official flag, and there was a local push for it to be a Nordic cross on account of Shetland and Orkney adopting similar designs to reflect their Viking roots. North of Scotland Newspapers launched a campaign to adopt a flag, which the area committee brought to Dr Joseph Morrow, the Lord Lyon King of Arms, and a competition began on 6th March and ended on June 29th. A shortlist of four designs was made which a judging panel then selected the winner from, which was in turn registered with the Flag Institute.

The finalists were:

Design A

The winning design.

291 votes

Design B

The wildcat head (drawn in Pictish-style art) is a homage to the old Kingdom of Cat, which was centred in Caithness. The triangle serves as a stylised representation of the shape of the county; a peninsula jutting out into the sea. As the word "ness" means "promontory", the cat and triangle together can also be seen as a play on Caithness' name ("Cat-ness"). The blue field and white chevron symbolises the sea and the county's maritime heritage, while the black stands for the Caithness flagstone.

226 votes

Design C

The galley with the raven on its sail is taken from the civic arms of Caithness, and is the traditional emblem of the county. The ship is placed in the canton to further highlight its importance. The wavy blue and white lines covering the rest of the field represent the sea and Caithness' maritime heritage. The black colour of the canton stands for the Caithness flagstone.

Design D

The galley with the raven on its sail (again from the civic arms of the county) is depicted as sailing on the sea, representing Caithness' maritime nature and heritage. The black background once again symbolises the Caithness flagstone.

== See also ==
- Flag of Orkney
- Flag of Shetland
- Flag of Scotland
- List of Scottish flags
- Nordic Cross Flag
