= List of Scottish flags =

This is a list of flags that are used exclusively in Scotland. Other flags used in Scotland, as well as the rest of the United Kingdom can be found at list of British flags.

== National flag ==
Flag	Date	Use	Description
	Since 1385 (832 According to Legend)	Flag of Scotland, also known as the Saint Andrew's Cross or The Saltire	A white saltire on a sky blue, navy blue, or royal blue (Pantone 300 medium blue) field
	Since 1385 (832 According to Legend)	Flag of Scotland, also known as the Saint Andrew's Cross or The Saltire	A vertical white saltire on a sky blue, navy blue, or royal blue (Pantone 300 medium blue) field.

A white saltire on a Pantone 300 medium blue per Scottish National Flag Code.

== Royal flags ==
Flag	Date	Use	Description
	Since 1998	Royal Standard of the United Kingdom used in Scotland	A banner of the Royal Coat of Arms of the United Kingdom used exclusively in Scotland by the sovereign. An alternative form is used elsewhere.
	Since 1222	Royal Banner of Scotland	A banner of the ancient Royal Coat of Arms of Scotland, now officially used in Scotland by representatives of the sovereign, including the First Minister of Scotland (as keeper of the Great Seal of Scotland), the Lord High Commissioner to the General Assembly of the Church of Scotland, the Lord Lyon King of Arms, and Lord Lieutenants within their lieutenancies. This flag is also used at the royal residences of Holyrood Palace and Balmoral Castle when the sovereign is not present.
		Standard of the Duke of Rothesay	The Royal Banner of Scotland defaced with a label of three points.
	Since 1974	Personal banner of the 23rd Duke of Rothesay	The personal banner of the current Duke, Prince William. The arms are based upon those of the Chief of Clan Stewart of Appin, and represent in the 1st and 4th quarters the title of Great Steward of Scotland whilst the 2nd and 3rd quarters represent the title of Lord of the Isles. In the centre, to difference the arms from those of Appin, is placed an escutcheon bearing the arms of the heir apparent to the King of Scots.
	Since 2022	Standard of the Queen used in Scotland	The Standard of Queen Camilla, namely the Royal Standard of the United Kingdom used in Scotland, impaled with the arms of her father, Bruce Shand.
	Since 2018	Standard of the Earl of Dumbarton	The Standard of Prince Harry, namely the Royal Standard of the United Kingdom used in Scotland, defaced with a label of five points, the first, centre and fifth points bearing a red scallop.
	Since 1998	Standard of Andrew Mountbatten-Windsor	The Standard of Andrew Mountbatten-Windsor, namely the Royal Standard of the United Kingdom used in Scotland defaced with a label of three points, the centre point bearing a blue anchor.
	Since 1999	Standard of the Duke of Edinburgh	The Standard of Prince Edward, namely the Royal Standard of the United Kingdom used in Scotland defaced with a label of three points, the centre point bearing a Tudor Rose.
	Since 1998	Standard of the Princess Royal used in Scotland	The Standard of Princess Anne, namely the Royal Standard of the United Kingdom used in Scotland defaced with a label of three points, the first and third points bearing a St George's Cross, the centre point bearing a red heart.

== Government flags ==
Flag	Date	Use	Description
	2025	The ensign used aboard the Marine Directorate's Marine Protection and Marine Research vessels.	A Blue Ensign defaced with the badge showing an anchor and the letters M and D, surrounded by a wreath of thistles, all beneath the Crown of Scotland
		The ensign of the former Scottish Fisheries Protection Agency. Formerly used aboard ships of the Scottish Government, such as the patrol boats of Marine Scotland.	A Blue Ensign defaced with the badge of the former Scottish Fisheries Protection Agency

== Counties, regions, and cities ==
=== Counties ===
Flag	Date	Use	Description
	Since 2023	Flag of Aberdeenshire	Divided gold and purple, with a white castle bearing an ancient crown, also divided purple and gold.
	Since 2023	Flag of Banffshire	A white bridge over blue water on a gold background with a sun the canton.
	Since 2023	Flag of Berwickshire	A horizontal blue and green bicolour divided in the middle by a white chain, with a leaping silver salmon in the blue section, and a curved gold ear of barley in the green section.
	Since 2016	Flag of Caithness	Black, with a blue Scandinavian Cross fimbriated in gold, and a galley in the upper hoist.
	Since 2018	Flag of East Lothian (Haddingtonshire)	A blue field with a gold saltire voided blue; over all a lozenge with a lion rampant.
	Since 2016	Flag of Kirkcudbrightshire	A green and white quartered field bearing the Cross of St Cuthbert (from whom the county is named).
	Since 2023	Flag of Morayshire	A wavy blue and gold background with a golden garb on a green hoist
	Since 2007	Flag of Orkney	Red, with a blue Nordic Cross outlined in yellow that extends to the edges of the flag. The colours from the Royal Standards of Scotland and of Norway and the Flag of Scotland.
	Since 2005 Created 1969	Flag of Shetland	Blue, with a white Nordic Cross. The colours of the Scottish flag.
	Since 2018	Flag of Sutherland	White, with a black nordic cross and black Saltire, and a gold eight-pointed star where the crosses intersect, representing the sun rising position within the Scottish sky. The white represents the former arms of the Sutherland County Council, while the black represents dark skies and the peat of the Flow Country.

=== Islands ===
Flag	Date	Use	Description
	Since 2017	Flag of Barra	Green, with a white Scandinavian Cross showing the ancestry of the people and places names of Barra. The green represents the green of the Barra Isles.
		Flag of the Outer Hebrides	Flag of the Comhairle nan Eilean Siar (Council of the Western Isles), sometimes used to represent the Outer Hebrides as a whole.
	Since 2018	Flag of Tiree	'The Sun of Barley': green, with twelve barley stalks in a wheel pattern. The green represents the fertility of the isle and the 'barley sun' its reputation as the 'sunshine isle' and the name 'Land of Barley' (Tìr an Eòrna).
	Since 2017	Flag of South Uist	A green flag bearing a blue Scandinavian Cross fimbriated in white
	Since 2020	Flag of Skye	Blue, with a yellow Scandinavian Cross entwined with a white circle. The flag brings together elements of the island’s Viking and Celtic heritage and depicts a birlinn boat with five oars – one for every area of the island.
	Since 2002	Flag of Gigha	Green field with the logo of the Gigha Heritage Trust in the centre. The logo contains the words "THE ISLE OF GIGHA - HERITAGE TRUST" and in the middle contains an illustration of the Carragh an Tarbert standing stone.
		Flag of Great Bernera	A white saltire on a red and blue field. The top and bottom are red and have a white triskelion, composed of three armoured legs and a white lymphad respectively. The hoist and fly are blue and have a white rock in flames each.

=== Local authorities, towns and cities ===
Flag	Date	Type	Use	Description
	?	Council	Flag of South Lanarkshire	Split in half by two shades of blue by an "S" shape, representing the first letter of the area's name. The crest of South Lanarkshire is in the centre.
	1927	Council, proposed	Proposed flag of Angus	A heraldic flag derived from the arms of Angus Council, consisting of four quarters containing a red crowned lion passant, a gold cinquefoil, a blue-white checked strip crossed with buckled red belt, and a depiction of the heart of Robert the Bruce to represent the four ancient earldoms of Angus.
	Since 2021	Area of Glasgow	Flag of Maryhill	The shape is supposed to represent a narrow boat travelling down the Forth and Clyde canal. The red represents the community's passion, the black Maryhill's industrial past, and the blue represents the River Kelvin as well as the Forth and Clyde canal.
	Since 2025	Village	Flag of Bothwell	
	Since 2025	Village	Flag of Embo	
	Since 2025	Town	Flag of Girvan	
	Flown since 2025	Burgh	Flag of Renfrew	The flag existed before 2025 however the council only received permission to fly it from the Lord Lyon in 2025.
	1378	City	Banner of the arms of Perth	A banner of the city's coat of arms showing a paschal lamb holding a saltire, within a royal tressure.
	1673	City	Flag of Dundee	Three lilies in a vase in white/silver on a blue field, a heraldic flag taken from the city council's coat of arms.
	1732	City	Flag of Edinburgh	A heraldic flag derived from the arms of Edinburgh Council.
	1866	City	Flag of Glasgow	A banner of the city's coat of arms.

== Historical flags ==
Flag	Date	Use	Description
	Since 1222	Royal Banner of Scotland	A banner of the ancient Royal Coat of Arms of Scotland, now officially used in Scotland by representatives of the sovereign, including the First Minister of Scotland (as keeper of the Great Seal of Scotland), the Lord High Commissioner to the General Assembly of the Church of Scotland, the Lord Lyon King of Arms, and Lord Lieutenants within their lieutenancies. This flag is also used at the royal residences of Holyrood Palace and Balmoral Castle when the sovereign is not present.
	Until 1707	Scottish Red Ensign, used by the Royal Scottish Navy	A Red Ensign with the Flag of Scotland in the canton.
	1606–1707	Scottish Union Flag	First Union Flag with the Flag of Scotland superior to and overlying the Flag of England.
	c.1617	An early version of the Union Flag that appears on a painted wooden ceiling boss from Linlithgow Palace	A blue Saint Andrew's Saltire superimposed over a red Saint George's Cross on a white background.
	17th-century	Scottish Covenanter flag	
	1698-1700	Flag of the Company of Scotland Trading to Africa and the Indies.	Red background with three small stripes at the bottom, from top to bottom, blue, white, and blue, representing a sea. There is a rising yellow sun off-centered slightly to the left.
	1715	The Jacobite Standard of 1715.	The Royal coat of arms of the Kingdom of Scotland with a scroll underneath bearing the motto "NEMO ME IMPUNE LACESSIT" on a field of dark blue.
	1745–1746	Standard of Bonnie Prince Charlie, raised at Glenfinnan on 19 August 1745.	A red flag, surrounded by a blue border on all sides, with a white square in the centre containing the White Rose of York.
	1745–1746	A representation of the Jacobite Standard said to have been used by Jacobite forces in 1745.	A red flag with a white rectangle in the centre bearing the motto "Tandem Triumphans"
	1902–1904	Flag of the Scottish National Antarctic Expedition	The flag of Scotland (dark blue variant) defaced with the white-coloured initials "SNAE", one in each quarter.
	1914–1917	Sledge flag brought by James Wordie on the Imperial Trans-Antarctic Expedition.	
	1944–1952	Standard of Princess Elizabeth, Duchess of Edinburgh	The Standard of Princess Elizabeth, Duchess of Edinburgh (prior to her accession as Queen Elizabeth II), namely the Royal Standard of the United Kingdom used in Scotland defaced with a label of three points, the first and third points bearing a Saint George's Cross, the centre point bearing a Tudor Rose.
	1997–1999	Flag of Rockall	A white flag with a black drawing of a rock sticking out of the waves, under a rainbow. There is a drawing of a whale on the rock.
	pre–2007	Former unofficial flag of Orkney, denied formal recognition by the Lord Lyon in 2001	The Cross of St Magnus. (An official flag was adopted in 2007).
	2005–2011	Flag of the Scottish Jacobite Party	Two crossed white sword blades on a field of red.
	2018	Flag of Sutherland	A swooping eagle, seen face on, against a vertical bicoloured red and yellow background, with the eagle counterchanged yellow and red; At the hoist three stars or mullets. Was originally unveiled as the Flag of Sutherland in February 2018, but was placed on hold due to backlash from residents. A public vote beginning in October 2018 led to the retirement of this flag in favour of the current design.
	1952–2021	Standard of Prince Philip, Duke of Edinburgh	A banner of the Coat of Arms of Prince Philip; 1st quarter representing Denmark, 2nd quarter Greece, 3rd quarter the Mountbatten family, 4th quarter Edinburgh.
	2011–2022	Standard of Prince William, Earl of Strathearn.	The Standard of Prince William, namely the Royal Standard of the United Kingdom used in Scotland, defaced with a label of three points, the centre point bearing a red scallop.

== University flags ==
Flag	Date	Use	Description
		Flag of Edinburgh Napier University	A flag diagonally divided by white and red - white in the top and fly, red in the hoist and bottom.
		Flag of the University of Edinburgh	A blue saltire on a white field, with a thistle in the upper quarter, a castle in the lower quarter, and an open book in the centre of the saltire. It is a banner of the University's coat of arms.
		Flag of the University of Glasgow	
		Flag of the University of St Andrews	A banner of the University's coat of arms.

== Organisations ==
Flag	Date	Use	Description
		Ensign of the Northern Lighthouse Board	A Blue Ensign defaced with a lighthouse
		Commissioner's flag of the Northern Lighthouse Board	A White Ensign with a pre-1801 Union Flag in the canton, defaced with a lighthouse
		Flag of the Church of Scotland	The flag of Scotland with the burning bush in the centre.
		Flag of the Diocese of Brechin	A banner of the Diocese's coat of arms.
		Flag of the Scottish Republican Socialist Movement	The flag of Scotland on the left side of a red flag, with a golden Triquetra knot in the centre of the red section.
