= Flag of Shetland =

Flag of British County

Shetland
- Use: Civil flag
- Proportion: 3:5
- Adopted: 2005
- Design: Azure, a cross argent in Scandinavian form
- Designed by: Roy Grønneberg & Bill Adams

The flag of Shetland is a white or silver Nordic cross on a blue background. The flag uses the colours of the flag of Scotland, but in the form of the Nordic cross in order to symbolise Shetland's historical and cultural ties with Scandinavia. The official recommended colour of the flag of Scotland is Pantone 300, which implies that this would be appropriate for the Shetland flag too, though the Flag Institute lists the colour as a similar Pantone 286. It was created by Roy Grønneberg and Bill Adams in 1969, to commemorate the 500th anniversary of the transfer of the islands from Norway in the Kalmar Union to Scotland and the 500 years before as part of Norway.

The flag is widely used privately by Shetlanders both on land and sea and is now seen as a symbol of the Shetland identity. In 2007 a "Shetland Flag Day" was introduced by the council, who hope the day will be used to "celebrate all things Shetland". After almost forty years of unofficial use, the flag was formally granted by the Lord Lyon King of Arms, the heraldic authority of Scotland, on 1 February 2005, in time for the Island Games in July 2005 in Shetland.

The flag is practically identical to the former unofficial national flag of Iceland (the Hvítbláinn) in use by Icelandic nationalist activists from 1897 until 1915, when it was in part abandoned due to its similarity to the Greek jack and the Swedish flag, which critics reasoned would be hard to tell apart at sea, a major issue in a time of war. The white and blue is still used by the Icelandic Youth Association, nationalists and at political events.

== Design ==
The flag is a white Nordic cross on a blue field, representing Shetland's historical and cultural ties with Scandinavia.

=== Colours ===
The colours on the flag are:

Scheme	Blue	White
Pantone (Paper)	286 C	White
Web colours	#0033A0	#FFFFFF
RGB	0, 51, 160	255, 255, 255
CMYK	100%, 68%, 0%, 37%	0%, 0%, 0%, 0%

== History ==
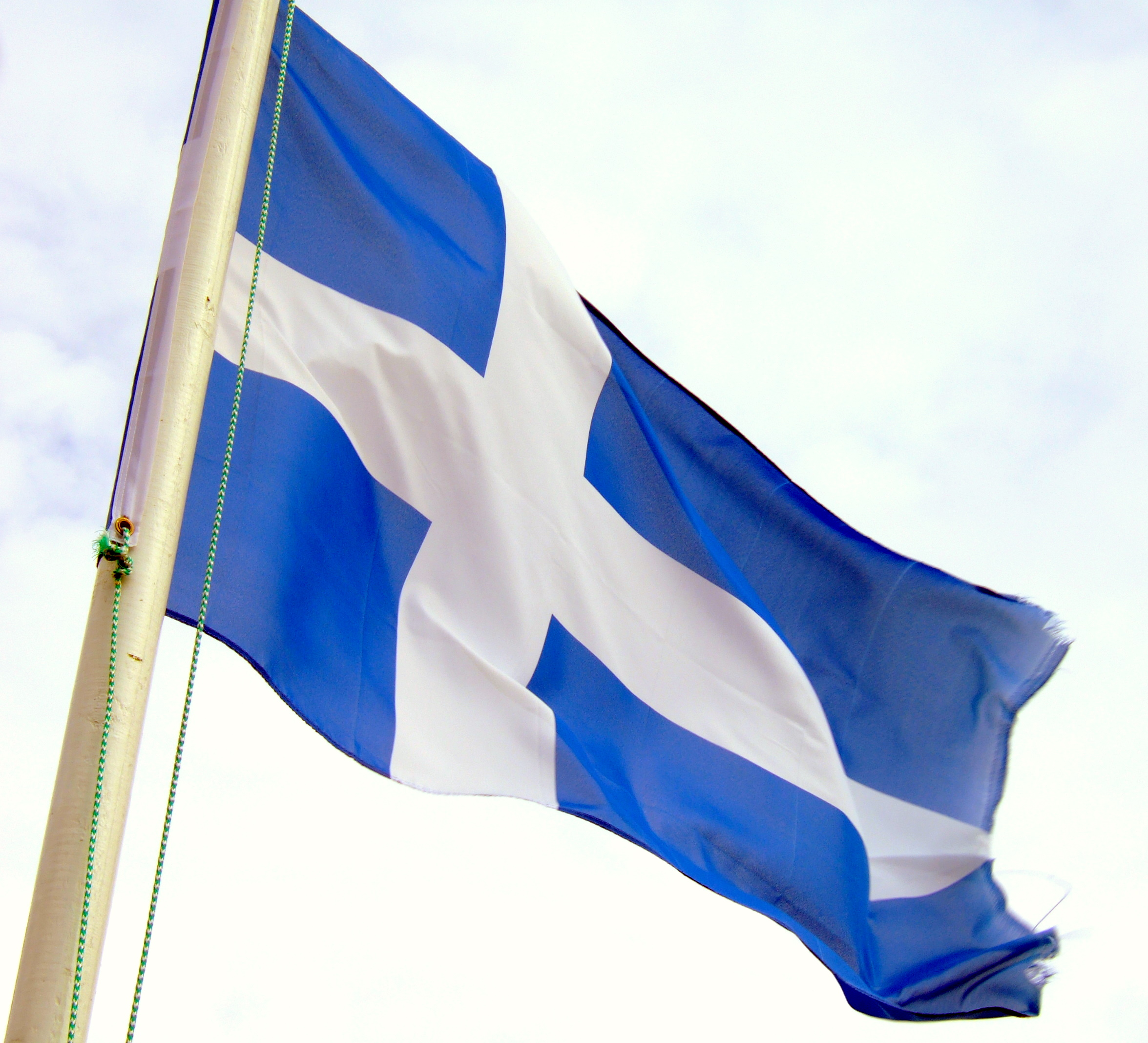
Photograph of the flag flying in Unst

All independent Nordic countries have adopted flags with the cross on it in the modern period, and while the Nordic cross is named for its use in the national flags of the Nordic nations, the term is used universally by vexillologists, in reference not only to the flags of the Nordic countries but to other flags with similar designs. The cross design represents Christianity, and was first seen in the Dannebrog, the national flag of Denmark in the first half of the 13th century.

The islands of Shetland came to be under Scottish control as a dowry for a wedding paid by Christian I. They continued to have a very Scandinavian culture, though. Banners of the arms of the local council authorities of Lerwick and Shetland were probably flown as flags around the island prior to the current one, which was designed in 1969 by students Roy Grønneberg and Bill Adams, designed to show the intersection between Scandinavian (by using the Nordic Cross) and British (by using the colours of the Scottish Saltire) cultures present on the island.

Maurice Mullay, who worked at Shetland's tourist office in 1985, visited Sweden, who were inspired by the flag. Swedish ships then began flying the flag on visits to the island. Although still unofficial at this time, it was flown as the flag of Shetland at the 1985 Island Games in the Isle of Man. In 2005 the Lord Lyon officially granted the flag to the council. The flag was flown by Shetland at the 2005 Island Games. Although at this time there was a rival flag that was similar but with a red square in the intersection of the cross, to make the ties to the Union Jack clearer, which was favoured by some residents. However, its use declined following the adoption of the official flag.

== Use ==
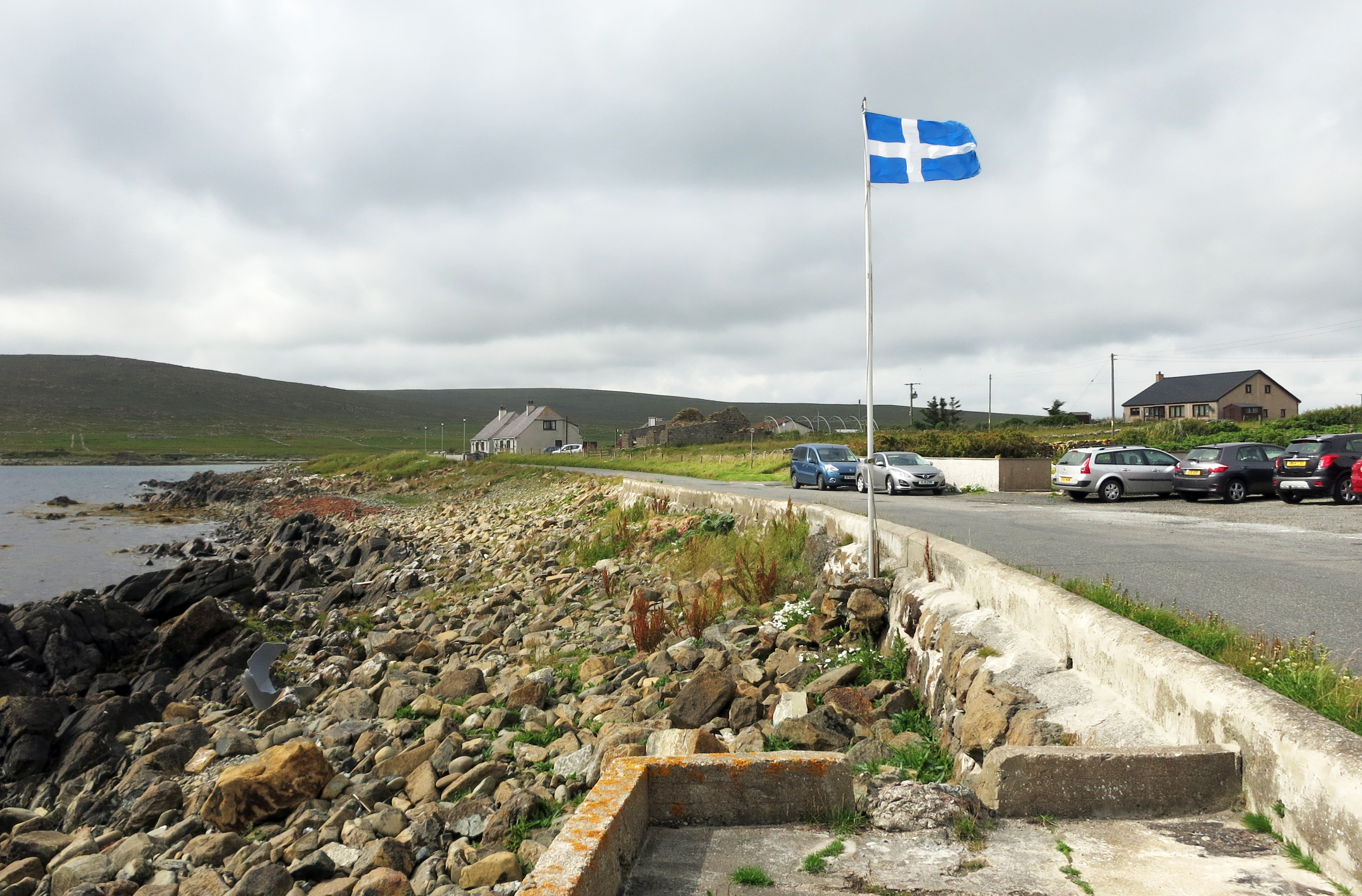
Shetland Flag flying in Haroldswick

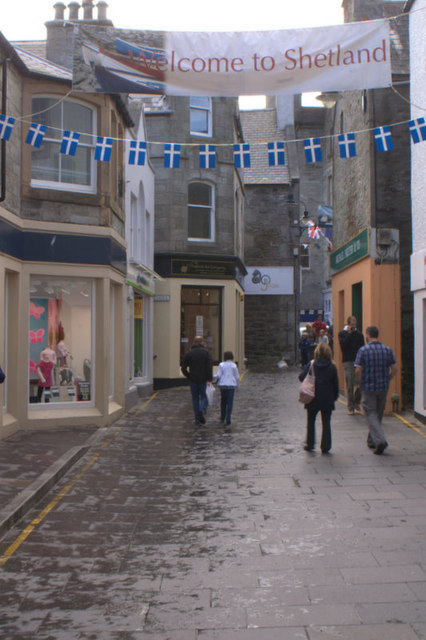
Bunting of the flag on Commercial Street in Lerwick.

== See also ==
- Flag of Orkney
- Flag of Scotland
- List of Scottish flags
- Nordic Cross Flag
