= Flag of Sutherland =

(since 2018)

Sutherland
- Proportion: 3:5
- Adopted: 14 December 2018
- Design: Argent, a cross in Scandinavian form surmounted by a saltire sable charged at the centre point with an eight-pointed star or
- Designed by: Joseph Morrow, Lord Lyon King of Arms

The Sutherland flag is the flag of the Scottish county of Sutherland. It was revealed on 14 December 2018 as the winner of a competition in which over 3,000 people from the county voted.

The overlaid Saltire and Nordic crosses denote Sutherland's unique history on the mainland where the extent of Viking control met Scotland. The golden sun that is formed where the arms of the crosses meet symbolise the sun raised high in the south for the origin of the county's name South Land as well as the sunrises seen on the east coast and sunsets on Sutherland's west coast. The black recalls the peat of the Flow Country and dark skies and together with the white recall the central colours of the former Sutherland Council arms.

== History ==
A competition was established by the local community in conjunction with the Flag Institute, and a flag was announced as the winner in the Northern Times newspaper in January 2018. The design was selected by a judging panel. The county's Lord Lieutenancy, however, froze the flag's registration with the Court of the Lord Lyon in March 2018 in light of opposition to the flag's design and the nature of the competition. The Sutherland Flag Committee announced in October 2018 that a public vote would be held to choose a flag. The shortlist of designs chosen by the judging panel included the originally announced design.

=== Original design ===
The original design announced by the Lord Lieutenancy in January 2018 features a swooping eagle, seen face on, against a vertical bicoloured red and yellow background, with the eagle counterchanged yellow and red. The bicolour of red and yellow represents the Atlantic Ocean and North Sea, which border the county on its west and east coasts respectively. At the hoist are three stars or mullets. These, plus the red and yellow colour combination, are taken from the arms borne by Hugh de Moray, Earl of Sutherland.

=== Reception ===
After a county newspaper, The Northern Times, published the final design, some Sutherland residents expressed disapproval, mainly through social media. Complaints focused on the colours, said to evoke communism, and that the eagle was crudely drawn and not the best choice to represent the region. It was suggested that the Scottish wildcat, a symbol associated with Sutherland, would have made a more appropriate choice. A spokesman for the flag selection committee countered that the "eagle featured prominently on a considerable number of the entries", that the wildcat is more associated with Caithness, and an eagle is more unifying as being prominent across the county.

The Court of the Lord Lyon started off the process of formally recognising the flag in early February 2018. A petition was put forth by one Sutherland resident to redesign the flag. The Vice Lord Lieutenant of Sutherland and chairman of the Flag Selection Committee asserted though that feedback, outside of social media, and especially from schools and young people from across Sutherland continues to indicate very strong support for the design. Due to the opposition towards the design, the office of the Lord Lyon halted the process of registering the flag, stating: "I understand that the petitioners (the Lord Lieutenancy) are considering the matter and, until we hear from them, no further procedures will take place in our office."

== Public vote ==
In October 2018, the Sutherland Flag Committee announced that a public vote would be held to choose the Sutherland flag. The shortlist of designs, selected by the judging panel, included the design originally announced as the flag, although it was ultimately not chosen by the public. The winning design was announced in December 2018.

Shortlisted designs put forward for the public vote
Option A
(original proposal)

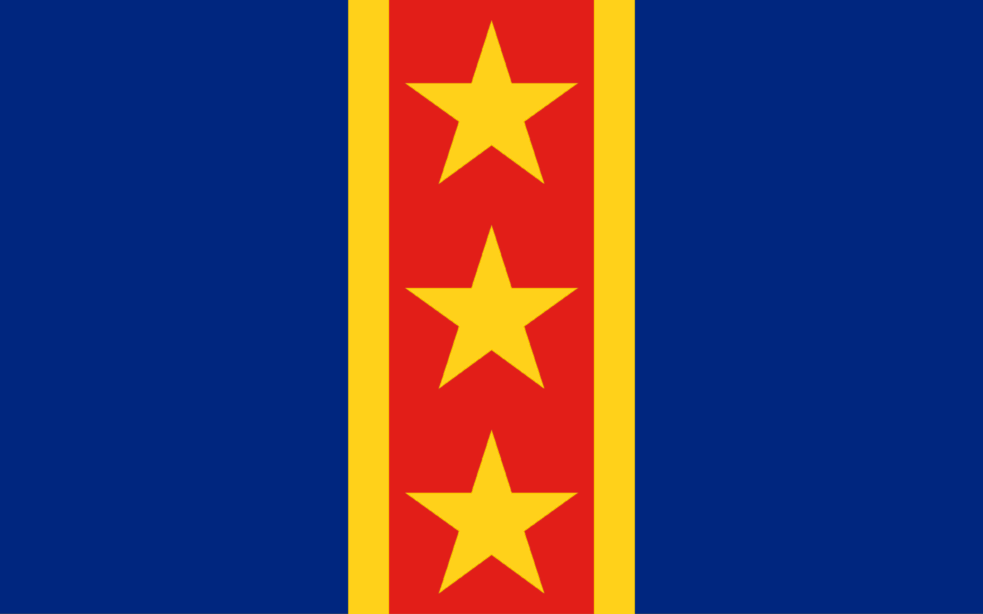
Option B

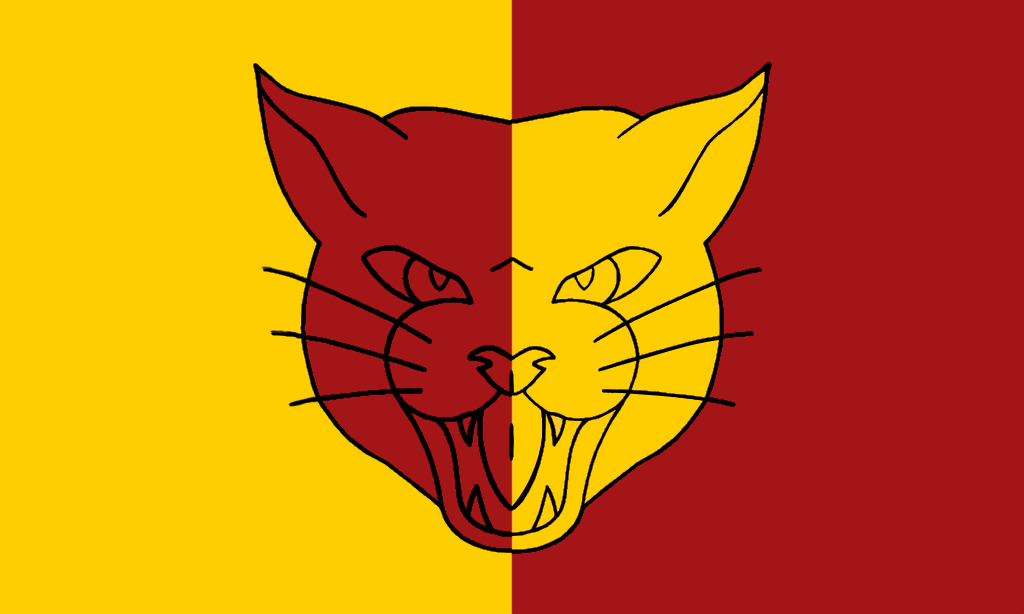
Option C

Option D
(winning design)

== See also ==
- List of Scottish flags
- List of British flags
