= Flag of Orkney =

(since 2007)

Orkney
- Use: Civil flag
- Proportion: 8:11
- Adopted: 2007
- Design: A yellow-fimbriated blue Nordic cross on a red field
- Designed by: Duncan Tullock

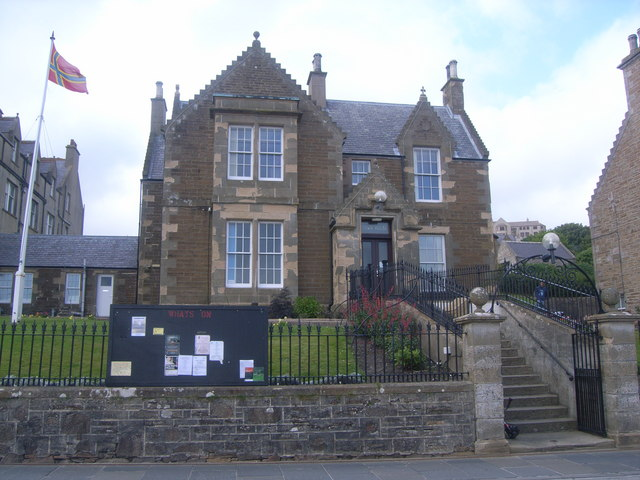
Photograph of the flag flying in Stromness

The Flag of Orkney was the winner of a public flag consultation in February and March 2007. In the flag consultation the people of Orkney were asked for their preferred design from a short list of 5, all of which had been approved by the Court of the Lord Lyon. The chosen design was that of Duncan Tullock of Birsay, which polled 53% of the 200 votes cast by the public.

== Design ==
The colours red and yellow are from the Scottish and Norwegian royal coats of arms, which both use yellow and red, with a lion rampant. The flag symbolises the islands' Scottish and Norwegian heritage. The blue is taken from the flag of Scotland and also represents the sea and the maritime heritage of the islands.

=== Colours ===
Scheme	Red	Yellow	Blue
Pantone (paper)	485 C	109 C	300 C
HEX	#DA291C	#f7d417	#005eb8
CMYK	0, 81, 87, 15	0, 14, 91, 3	100, 49, 0, 28
RGB	217, 41, 28	247, 213, 22	0, 94, 184

== History ==
=== 1995 flag ===
Former flag of Orkney, adopted in 1995

A flag bearing a red Nordic cross on a yellow field was adopted in 1995. In 2001, the flag of Orkney, the traditional flag of St Magnus, was declined official recognition by the Lord Lyon, the heraldic authority of Scotland, due to similarity with other national flags; most notably, the flag of Ulster, as well as the flag of the Kalmar Union. Despite its association with Magnus, there is no historical connection between him and the design. The flag was never made official by any government body. A local citizen, Robert Foden of Kirkwall questioned both Lyon's decision, and more broadly, his authority on such matters in The Orcadian. Mr Foden stated that the flag of the Kalmar union was designed in the 14th century and would've flown as an official banner in Orkney (as Orkney was part of the Union), until its secession to Scotland in 1468. Furthermore, the flag was flown in Orkney even after the dissolution of the Kalmar Union in 1512, instead of the Scottish flag. This argument did not hold sway with the council, however.

=== 2007 competition ===
In 2007 the council of Orkney decided to have a competition to design a new flag, put to public vote, that would be officially adopted to represent the islands. Twelve designs were whittled down from over 100 submissions, which were further whittled down following a discussion between the council and the Lord Lyon to five. The finalists were the following flags:

Design 1

Design 2 (winner)

Design 3

Design 4

Design 5

The second flag, designed by local postman Duncan Tullock, won with a majority of 53% of the votes, and was registered with the Flag Institute following official adoption. The flag is flown across Orkney and used as the emblem of various local sports teams.

== See also ==
- Flag of Shetland
- Nordic Cross Flag
- Royal Standard of Scotland
- Royal Standard of Norway
- Flag of Norway
- List of Scottish flags
- Emblems of the Kalmar Union
