= Flag of Tiree =

Tiree
- Sun of Barley
- Proportion: 3:5
- Adopted: 8 September 2018
- Designed by: Donald Cameron

The Tiree flag is the flag of the island of Tiree in the Inner Hebrides, Scotland. Designed by Donald Cameron, it was selected by a community vote and adopted on 8 September 2018. The flag has twelve ears of barley on a green field arranged in a circular pattern representing the sun. The design, which references the crest of the Tiree Association, represents a traditional name for the island, Tìr an Eòrna 'The Land of Barley', and its reputation as 'the sunshine isle'.

== History ==
In 2017, the Tiree Community Council proposed adopting a flag for the island. Following local support for the idea, a design competition was held from 2 April to 1 May 2018. Four finalists were selected from 261 entries. A community vote was set up at the 2018 Agricultural Show, with postal and online votes also accepted. 1,598 votes were cast, 56% of which were for Donald Cameron's design.

== Poem ==
Professor Donald E. Meek composed a poem in commemoration of the flag:

BRATACH AN EILEIN SEO

Bratach an eilein seo,
togaibh gu h-àrd i;
togaibh gu faramach,
togaibh gu làidir.

Bratach an eilein seo
togaibh gu càirdeil,
togaibh gu carthannach,
togaibh gu bàidheil.

Bratach an eilein seo,
togaibh gu fàilteach,
togaibh gu snasail i,
togaibh ‘s gach àite.

Bratach an eilein seo,
togaibh gu gràdhach,
togaibh gu h-aighearach,
togaibh gu dàn i.

Bratach an eilein seo,
Tiriodh nan tràighean,
Tiriodh nam machraichean –
togaibh an-dràsd’ i.

Translation:
THE FLAG OF THIS ISLAND

The flag of this island
hoist it up prominently,
hoist it up crackingly,
hoist it up strongly.

The flag of this island,
hoist it in friendship,
hoist it with kindness,
hoist it with empathy.

The flag of this island,
hoist it in welcome,
hoist it up elegantly,
hoist it up everywhere.

The flag of this island,
hoist with affection,
hoist it up happily,
hoist it up fearlessly.

The flag of this island,
Tiree of sandy shores,
Tiree of the machairs –
hoist it immediately.
