= Flag of Scotland =

Scotland
- St Andrew's Cross; The Saltire
- Use: National flag
- Proportion: Mass-produced versions tend towards 1:2 or 2:3 (3:5 shown)
- Adopted: 1542 (Standardised in 2003)
- Design: A blue (Pantone 300 recommended) field on which a white saltire extends to the corners of the flag. In Blazon, Azure, a saltire Argent.

The flag of Scotland (Scottish Gaelic: bratach na h-Alba; Scots: Banner o Scotland, also known as St Andrew's Cross or the Saltire) is the national flag of Scotland, which consists of a white saltire over a blue field. The Saltire, rather than the Royal Standard of Scotland, is the correct flag for all private individuals and corporate bodies to fly. It is also, where possible, flown from Scottish Government buildings every day from 8:00 am until sunset, with certain exceptions.

Use of the flag is first recorded with the illustration of a heraldic flag in Sir David Lyndsay of the Mount's Register of Scottish Arms, c. 1542. It is possible that this is based on a precedent of the late 15th century, the use of a white saltire in the canton of a blue flag reputedly made by Queen Margaret, wife of James III (1451–1488).

== Design ==
The heraldic term for an X-shaped cross is a 'saltire', from the old French word saultoir or salteur (itself derived from the Latin saltatorium), a word for both a type of stile constructed from two cross pieces and a type of cross-shaped stirrup-cord. In heraldic language, the Scottish flag may be blazoned azure, a saltire argent. The tincture of the Saltire can appear as either silver (argent) or white. However, the term azure does not refer to a particular shade of blue.

Throughout the history of fabric production natural dyes have been used to apply a form of colour, with dyes from plants, including indigo and woad, having dozens of compounds whose proportions may vary according to soil type and climate; therefore giving rise to variations in shade. In the case of the Saltire, variations in shades of blue have resulted in the background of the flag ranging from sky blue to navy blue. When incorporated as part of the Union Flag during the 17th century, the dark blue applied to Union Flags destined for maritime use was possibly selected on the basis of the durability of darker dyes, with this dark blue shade eventually becoming standard on Union Flags both at sea and on land. Some flag manufacturers selected the same navy blue colour trend of the Union Flag for the Saltire itself, leading to a variety of shades of blue being depicted on the flag of Scotland.

These variations in shade eventually led to calls to standardise the colour of Scotland's national flag, and in 2003 a committee of the Scottish Parliament met to examine a petition that the Scottish Executive adopt the Pantone 300 colour as a standard (this blue is of a lighter shade than the Pantone 280 of the Union Flag). Having taken advice from a number of sources, including the office of the Lord Lyon King of Arms, the committee recommended that the optimum shade of blue for the Saltire be Pantone 300. Recent versions of the Saltire have therefore largely converged on this official recommendation (Pantone 300 is #005EB8 as a web colour).

Scheme	Blue	White
Pantone	300 C	White
Web colour	#005EB8	#FFFFFF
RGB	0, 94, 184	255, 255, 255
CMYK	72-35-0-28	0-0-0-0

The flag proportions are not fixed but 3:5 is most commonly used, as with other flags of the countries of the United Kingdom (flag manufacturers themselves may adopt alternative ratios, including 1:2 or 2:3). Lord Lyon King of Arms states that 4:5 is suitable. The ratio of the width of the bars of the saltire in relation to the width of the field is specified in heraldry in relation to shield width rather than flag width. However, this ratio, though not rigid, is specified as one-third to one-fifth of the width of the field.

Saltire with sky blue field

Saltire with navy blue field

== History ==
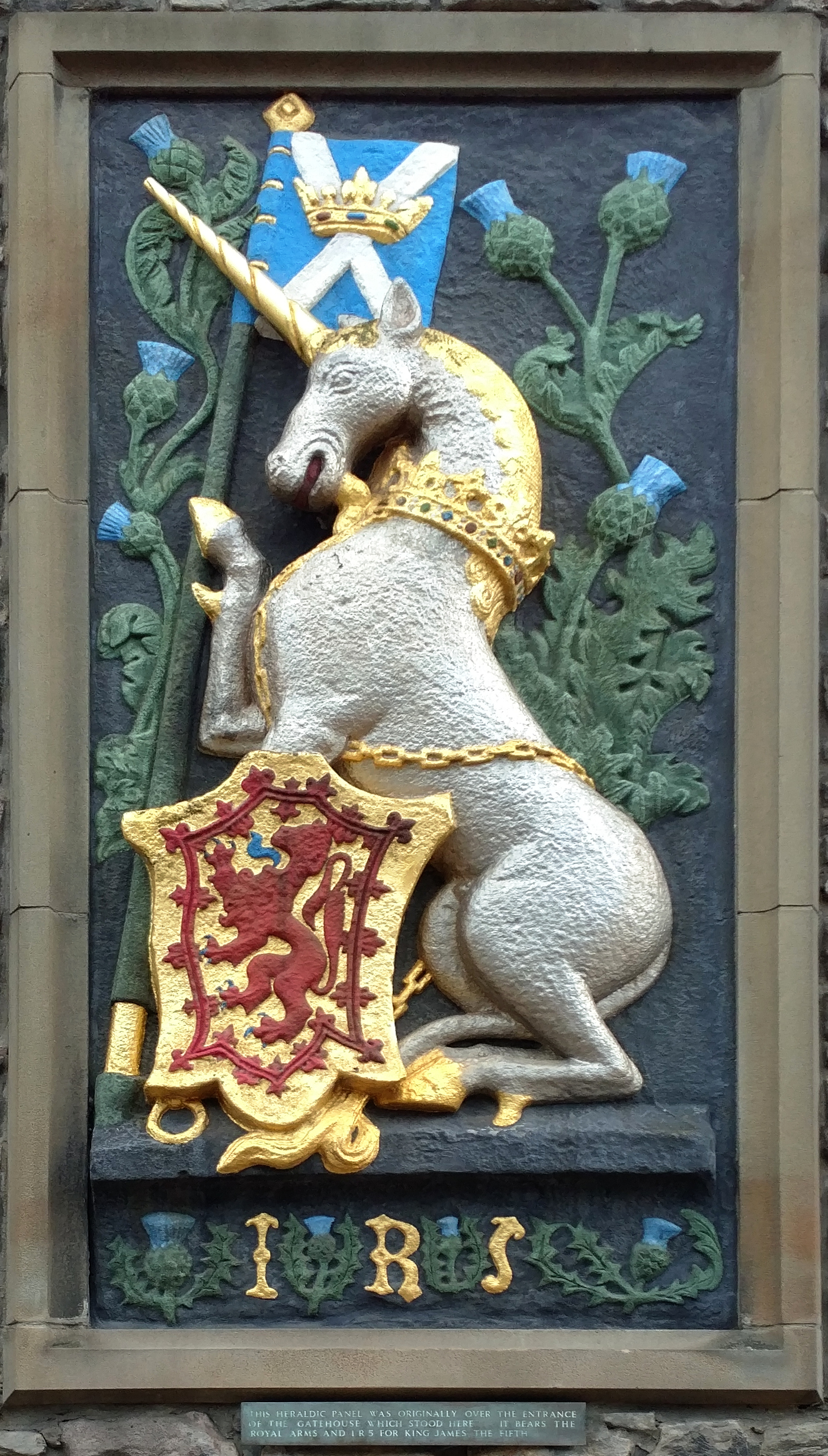
Arms of James V (1513–42)

According to legend, the use of the Saltire as the flag of Scotland originated on the eve of the Battle of Athelstaneford in 832. The 1320 Declaration of Arbroath cites Scotland's conversion to Christianity by St. Andrew, "the first to be an Apostle". Depiction of the saint being crucified on a decussate cross was seen on seals in Scotland from 1180 onwards and was used on a seal of the Guardians of Scotland, dated 1286. Bishop William de Lamberton (r. 1297–1328) also used the crucified figure of the saint in his seal.

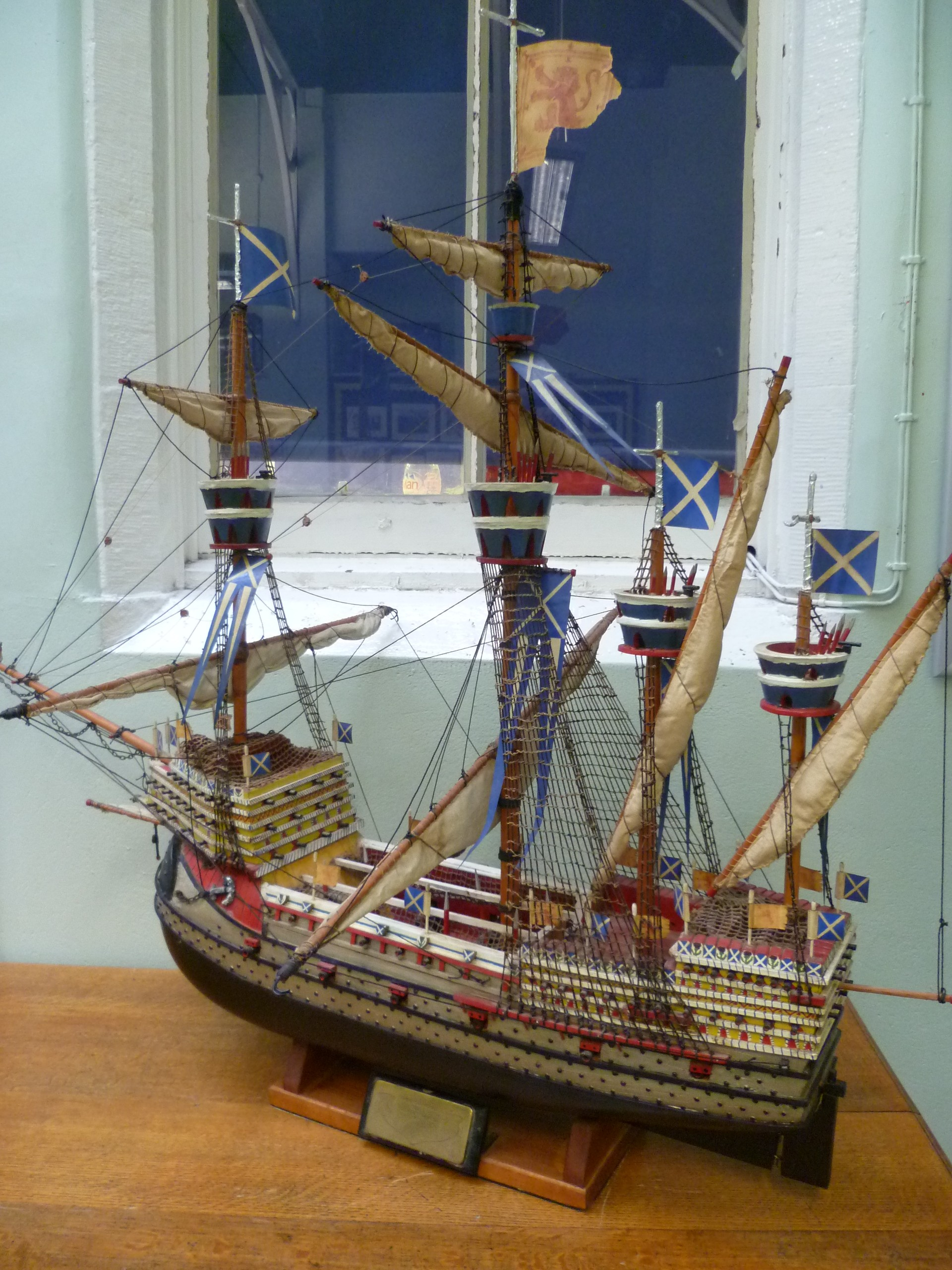
Model of the Great Michael

The saltire (decussate cross, diagonal cross) was used as a field sign in the medieval period without any connection to Saint Andrew. The connection between the field sign and the legendary mode of crucifixion of the saint may originate in Scotland, in the late 14th century. The Parliament of Scotland decreed in 1385 that every Scottish and French soldier (fighting against the English under Richard II) "shall have a sign before and behind, namely a white St. Andrew's Cross".

James Douglas, 2nd Earl of Douglas at the Battle of Otterburn (1388) reportedly used a pennon with a saltire at the hoist. Similarly, white saltire was shown in the canton of the "Blue Blanket of the Trades of Edinburgh", reputedly made by Queen Margaret, wife of James III (1451–1488). This is the flag of the Incorporated Trades of Edinburgh, and the focal point of the Riding of the Marches ceremony held in the city each year.

Use of the white "Sanct Androis cors" on blue as a naval flag is recorded for 1507, for the carrack Great Michael. As a heraldic flag, the white saltire on a blue field is first shown in 1542, in the armorial of David Lyndsay. Here, the royal arms are supported by two unicorns, each holding the saltire banner.

== Protocol ==
=== Use by the Scottish Government ===
Scottish Government logo

The Scottish Government has ruled that the Saltire should, where possible, fly on all its buildings every day from 8am until sunset. An exception is made for United Kingdom "national days", when on buildings where only one flagpole is present the Saltire shall be lowered and replaced with the Union Flag. Such flag days are standard throughout the United Kingdom, with the exception of Merchant Navy Day (3 September) which is a specific flag day in Scotland during which the Red Ensign of the Merchant Navy may be flown on land in place of either the Saltire or Union Flag.

A further Scottish distinction from the UK flag days is that on Saint Andrew's Day (30 November) the Union Flag will only be flown where a building has more than one flagpole; the Saltire will not be lowered to make way for the Union Flag where a single flagpole is present. If there are two or more flagpoles present, the Saltire may be flown in addition to the Union Flag but not in a superior position. This distinction arose after Members of the Scottish Parliament complained that Scotland was the only country in the world where the potential existed for the citizens of a country to be unable to fly their national flag on their country's national day. In recent years, embassies of the United Kingdom have also flown the Saltire to mark St Andrew's Day. Many bodies of the Scottish Government use the flag as a design basis for their logo. For example, Safer Scotland's emblem depicts a lighthouse shining beams in a saltire shape onto a blue sky. Other Scottish bodies, both private and public, have also used the saltire in similar ways.

=== Use by military institutions on land ===
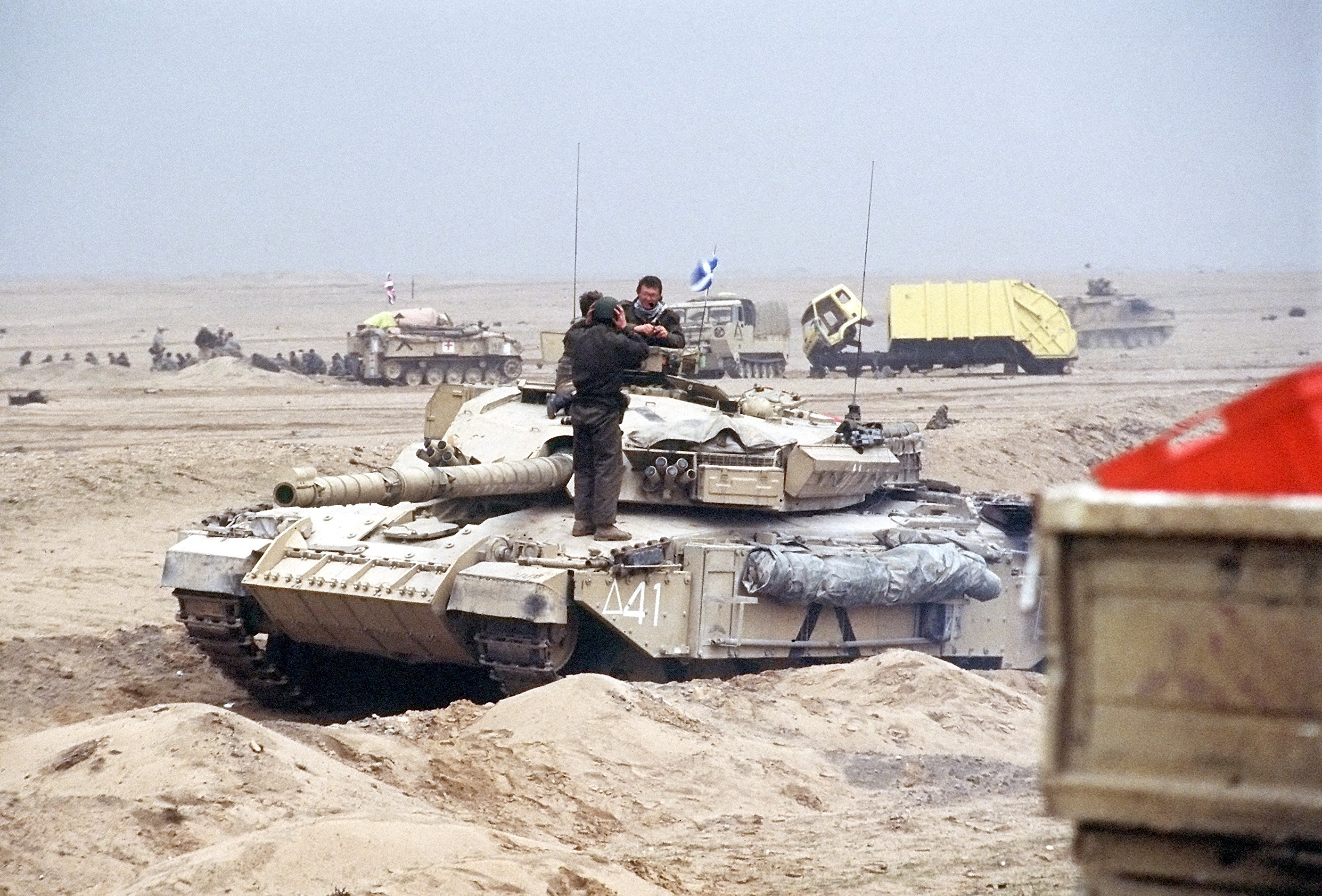
Challenger 1 tank of the Royal Scots Dragoon Guards flying a Saltire from the whip antenna

The seven British Army Infantry battalions of the Scottish Division, plus the Scots Guards and Royal Scots Dragoon Guards regiments, use the Saltire in a variety of forms. Combat and transport vehicles of these Army units may be adorned with a small, (130x80mm approx.), representation of the Saltire; such decals being displayed on the front and/or rear of the vehicle (on tanks these may also be displayed on the vehicle turret). In Iraq, during both Operation Granby and the subsequent Operation Telic, the Saltire was seen to be flown from the communications whip antenna of vehicles belonging to these units. Funerals, conducted with full military honours, of casualties of these operations in Iraq, plus those killed in operations in Afghanistan, have also been seen to include the Saltire being draped over the coffin of the deceased on such occasions.

In the battle for "hearts and minds" in Iraq, the Saltire was again used by the British Army as a means of distinguishing troops belonging to Scottish regiments from other coalition forces, in the hope of fostering better relations with the civilian population in the area south west of Baghdad. Leaflets were distributed to Iraqi civilians, by members of the Black Watch, depicting troops and vehicles set against a backdrop of the Saltire.

Immediately prior to, and following, the merger in March 2006 of Scotland's historic infantry regiments to form a single Royal Regiment of Scotland, a multi-million-pound advertising campaign was launched in Scotland in an attempt to attract recruits to join the reorganised and simultaneously rebranded "Scottish Infantry". The recruitment campaign employed the Saltire in the form of a logo; the words "Scottish Infantry. Forward As One." being placed next to a stylised image of the Saltire. For the duration of the campaign, this logo was used in conjunction with the traditional Army recruiting logo; the words "Army. Be The Best." being placed beneath a stylised representation of the Union Flag. Despite this multi-media campaign having had mixed results in terms of overall success, the Saltire continues to appear on a variety of Army recruiting media used in Scotland.

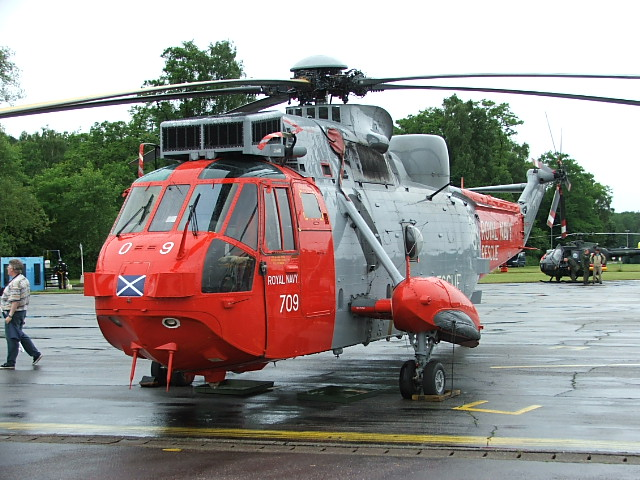
Royal Navy Sea King Mk5 of HMS Gannet

Other uses of the Saltire by the Army include the cap badge design of the Royal Regiment of Scotland, which consists of a (silver) Saltire, surmounted by a (gilt) lion rampant and ensigned with a representation of the Crown of Scotland (this same design, save for the Crown, is used on both the Regimental flag and tactical recognition flash of the Royal Regiment of Scotland). The badge of the No. 679 (The Duke of Connaught's) Squadron Army Air Corps bears a Saltire between two wreaths ensigned 'Scottish Horse', an honour they received in 1971 which originated through their links with the Royal Artillery. The Officer Training Corps units attached to universities in Edinburgh and Glasgow, plus the Tayforth University OTC, all feature the Saltire in their cap badge designs.

The Fleet Air Arm of the Royal Navy adorned three of their aircraft with the Saltire. Specifically, the Westland Sea King Mk5 aircraft of HMS Gannet, operating in the Search and Rescue (SAR) role from Royal Naval Air Station Prestwick, Ayrshire, displayed a Saltire decal on the nose of each aircraft.

Although not represented in the form of a flag, the No. 602 (City of Glasgow) Squadron of the Royal Auxiliary Air Force uses the Saltire surmounted by a lion rampant as the device shown on the squadron crest. The station crest of the former RAF Leuchars, Fife, also showed the Saltire, in this case surmounted by a sword. The crest of the former RAF East Fortune, East Lothian, also showed a sword surmounting the Saltire, however, unlike Leuchars, this sword was shown inverted and the station crest of the former RAF Turnhouse, Edinburgh, showed a Saltire surmounted by an eagle's head. The East of Scotland Universities Air Squadron crest features a Saltire surmounted by an open book; the book itself being supported by red lions rampant.

=== General use ===
In Scotland, the Saltire can be flown at any time by any individual, company, local authority, hospital or school without obtaining express consent. Many local authorities in Scotland fly the Saltire from Council Buildings. However, in 2007 Angus Council approved a proposal to replace the Saltire on Council Buildings with a new Angus flag, based on the council's coat of arms. This move led to public outcry across Scotland with more than 7,000 people signing a petition opposing the council's move, leading to a compromise whereby the Angus flag would not replace but be flown alongside the Saltire on council buildings.

In the United Kingdom, owners of vehicles registered in Great Britain have the option of displaying the Saltire on the vehicle registration plate, in conjunction with the letters "SCO" or alternatively the word "Scotland". In 1999, the Royal Mail issued a series of pictorial stamps for Scotland, with the '2nd' value stamp depicting the Flag of Scotland. In Northern Ireland, sections of the Protestant community routinely employ the Saltire as a means of demonstrating and celebrating their Ulster-Scots heritage.

Royal Scots Navy red ensign

Use of the Saltire at sea as a Jack or courtesy flag has been observed, including as a Jack on the Scottish Government's Marine Patrol Vessel (MPV) Jura. The ferry operator Caledonian MacBrayne routinely flies the Saltire as a Jack on vessels which have a bow staff, including when such vessels are underway. This practice has also been observed on the Paddle Steamer Waverley when operating in and around the Firth of Clyde. The practice of maritime vessels adopting the Saltire, for use as a jack or courtesy flag, may lead to possible confusion in that the Saltire closely resembles the maritime signal flag M, "MIKE", which is used to indicate "My vessel is stopped; making no way." For the benefit of Scottish seafarers wishing to display a Scottish flag other than the Saltire, thereby avoiding confusion and a possible fine, a campaign was launched in November 2007 seeking official recognition for the historic Scottish Red Ensign. Despite having last been used officially by the pre-Union Royal Scots Navy and merchant marine fleets in the 18th century, the flag continues to be produced by flag manufacturers and its unofficial use by private citizens on water has been observed.

== Incorporation into the Union Flag ==
The Saltire is one of the key components of the Union Flag which, since its creation in 1606, has appeared in various forms following the Flag of Scotland and Flag of England first being merged to mark the Union of the Crowns, an event occurred in 1603 when James VI, King of Scots, acceded to the thrones of both England and Ireland upon the death of Elizabeth I of England. The proclamation by King James, made on 12 April 1606, which led to the creation of the Union Flag states:

By the King: Whereas, some differences hath arisen between Our subjects of South and North Britaine travelling by Seas, about the bearing of their Flagges: For the avoiding of all contentions hereafter. We have, with the advice of our Council, ordered: That from henceforth all our Subjects of this Isle and Kingdome of Great Britaine, and all our members thereof, shall beare in their main-toppe the Red Crosse, commonly called St. George's Crosse, and the White Crosse, commonly called St. Andrew's Crosse, joyned together according to the forme made by our heralds, and sent by Us to our Admerall to be published to our Subjects: and in their fore-toppe our Subjects of South Britaine shall weare the Red Crosse onely as they were wont, and our Subjects of North Britaine in their fore-toppe the White Crosse onely as they were accustomed. – 1606.

— Proclamation of James VI, King of Scots: Orders in Council – 12 April 1606.

However, in objecting strongly to the form and pattern of Union Flag designed by the College of Arms and approved by King James, whereby the cross of Saint George surmounted that of Saint Andrew, regarded in Scotland as a slight upon the Scottish nation, a great number of shipmasters and ship-owners in Scotland took up the matter with John Erskine, 19th Earl of Mar, and encouraged him to send a letter of complaint, dated 7 August 1606, to James VI, via the Privy Council of Scotland, stating:

Most sacred Soverayne. A greate nomber of the maisteris and awnaris of the schippis of this your Majesteis kingdome hes verie havelie compleint to your Majesteis Counsell that the form and patrone of the flaggis of schippis, send doun heir and commandit to be ressavit and used be the subjectis of boith kingdomes, is very prejudiciall to the fredome and dignitie of this Estate and will gif occasioun of reprotche to this natioun quhairevir the said flage sal happin to be worne beyond sea becaus, as your sacred majestie may persave, the Scottis Croce, callit Sanctandrois Croce is twyse divydit, and the Inglishe Croce, callit Sanct George, haldin haill and drawne through the Scottis Croce, whiche is thairby obscurit and no takin nor merk to be seen of the Scottis Armes. This will breid some heit and miscontentment betwix your Majesteis subjectis, and it is to be ferit that some inconvenientis sall fall out betwix thame, for oure seyfairing men cannot be inducit to ressave that flag as it is set doun. They haif drawne two new drauchtis and patronis as most indifferent for boith kingdomes which they present to the Counsell, and craved our approbatioun of the same; bot we haif reserved that to you Majesteis princelie determination.

— Letter from the Privy Council of Scotland to James VI, King of Scots – 7 August 1606.

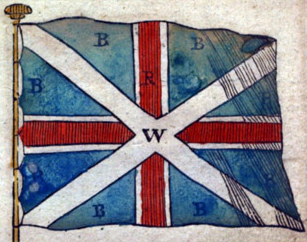
Flag depicted in The Present State of the Universe (1704)

Despite the drawings described in this letter as showing drafts of the two new patterns, together with any royal response to the complaint which may have accompanied them, having been lost, (possibly in the 1834 Burning of Parliament), other evidence exists, at least on paper, of a Scottish variant whereby the Scottish cross appears uppermost. Whilst, in the absence of evidence to the contrary, this design is considered by most vexillologists to have been unofficial, there is reason to believe that such flags were employed during the 17th century for use on Scottish vessels at sea. This flag's design is also described in the 1704 edition of The Present State of the Universe by John Beaumont, Junior, which contains as an appendix The Ensigns, Colours or Flags of the Ships at Sea: Belonging to The several Princes and States in the World.

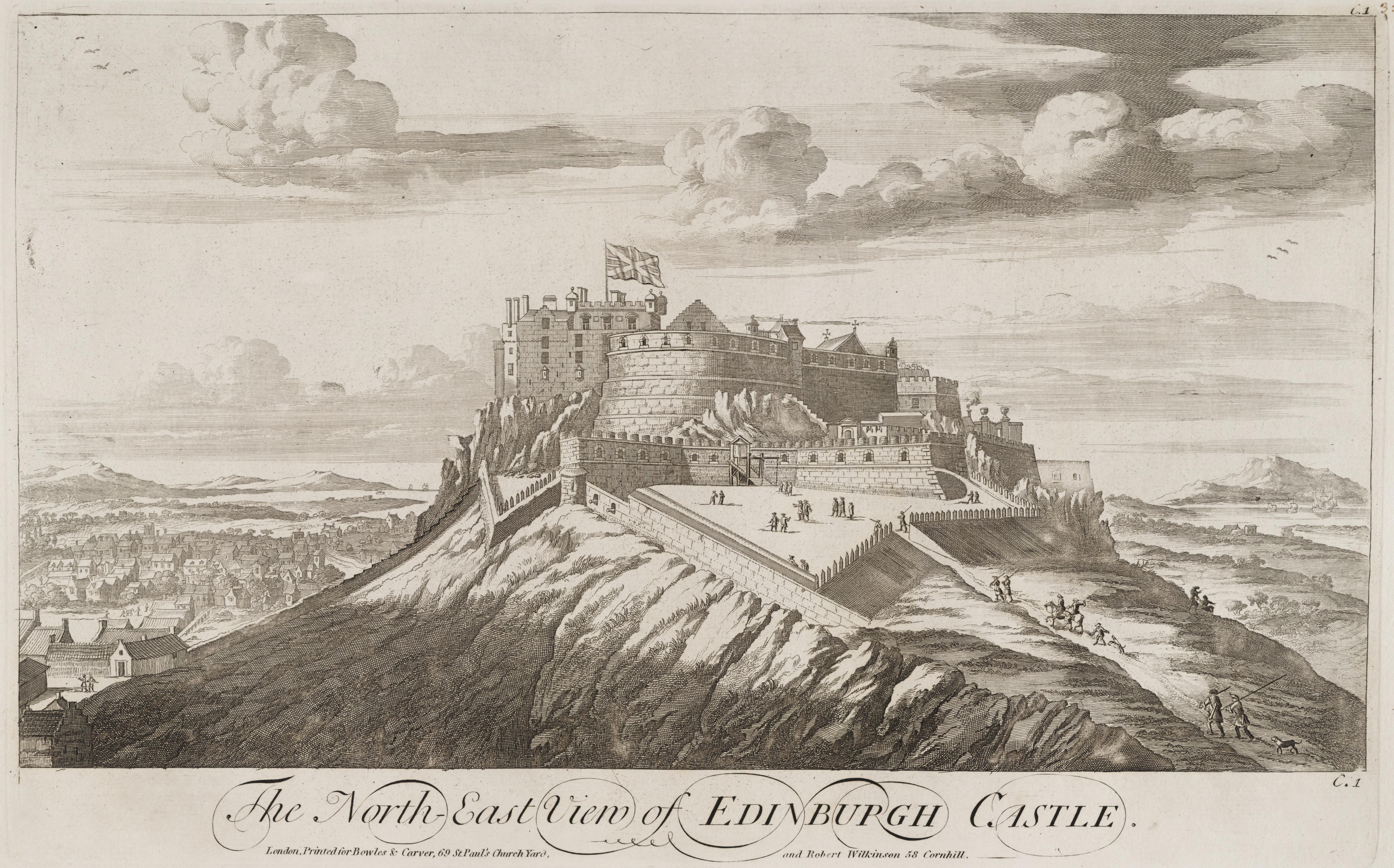
Slezer's Edinburgh Castle c. 1693 with Scottish Union Flag above the Royal apartments

On land, evidence suggesting use of this flag appears in the depiction of Edinburgh Castle by John Slezer, in his series of engravings entitled Theatrum Scotiae, c. 1693. Appearing in later editions of Theatrum Scotiae, the North East View of Edinburgh Castle engraving depicts the Scotch (to use the appropriate adjective of that period) version of the Union Flag flying from the Castle Clock Tower.

A reduced view of this engraving, with the flag similarly detailed, also appears on the Plan of Edenburgh, Exactly Done. However, on the engraving entitled North Prospect of the City of Edenburgh the detail of the flag, when compared to the aforementioned engravings, appears indistinct and lacks any element resembling a saltire. The reduced version of the North Prospect ..., as shown on the Plan of Edenburgh, Exactly Done, does however display the undivided arm of a saltire and is thereby suggestive of the Scottish variant.

"Scots union flag as said to be used by the Scots."

On 17 April 1707, just two weeks prior to the Acts of Union coming into effect, Sir Henry St George, Garter King of Arms, presented several designs to Queen Anne and her Privy Council for consideration as the flag of the soon to be unified Kingdom of Great Britain. At the request of the Scots representatives, the designs for consideration included that version of Union Flag showing the Cross of Saint Andrew uppermost; identified as being the "Scots union flagg as said to be used by the Scots". However, Queen Anne and her Privy Council approved Sir Henry's original effort (pattern "one") showing the Cross of Saint George uppermost.

From 1801, in order to symbolise the union of the Kingdom of Great Britain with the Kingdom of Ireland a new design, which included the St Patrick's Cross, was adopted for the flag of the United Kingdom of Great Britain and Ireland. A manuscript compiled from 1785 by William Fox, and in possession of the Flag Research Center, includes a full plate showing "the scoth [sic] union" flag with the addition of the cross of St. Patrick. This could imply that there was still some insistence on a Scottish variant after 1801.

Despite its unofficial and historic status the Scottish Union Flag continues to be produced by flag manufacturers, and its unofficial use by private citizens on land has been observed. In 2006 historian David R. Ross called for Scotland to once again adopt this design in order to "reflect separate national identities across the UK". However, the 1801 design of the Union Flag remains the official flag of the entire United Kingdom of Great Britain and Northern Ireland.

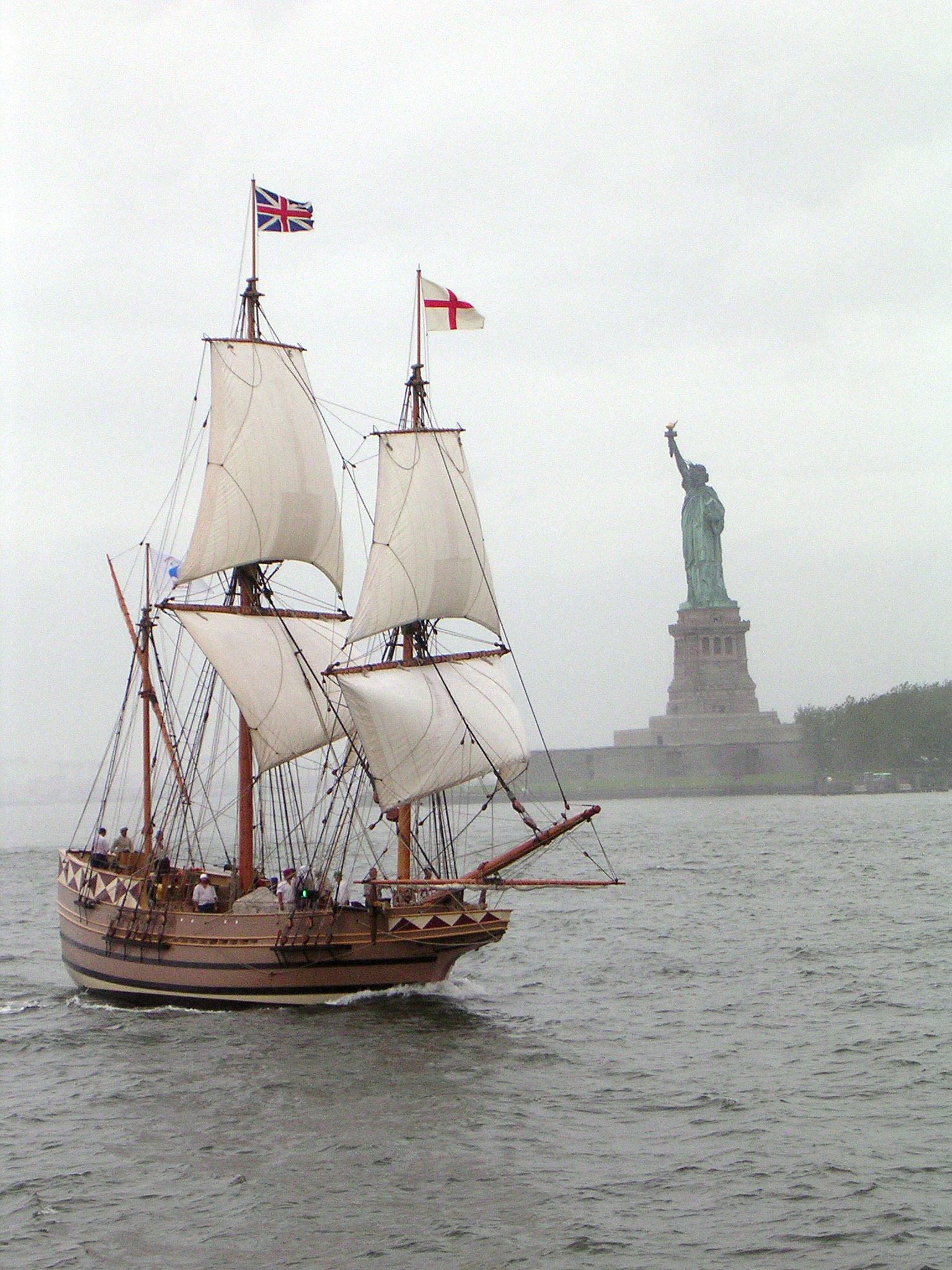
Replica of 17th century English ship Godspeed, with conjoined Union flag in her “main-toppe” and "Red Crosse" of "South Britaine" in her “fore-toppe”.

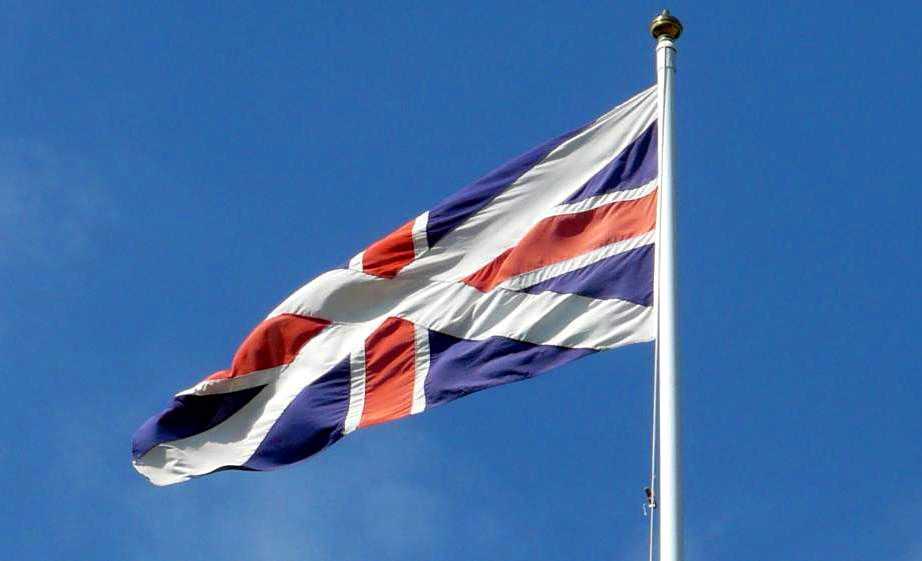
Scottish Union Flag. An unofficial variant used in the Kingdom of Scotland during the 17th century, following the Union of the Crowns in 1603.

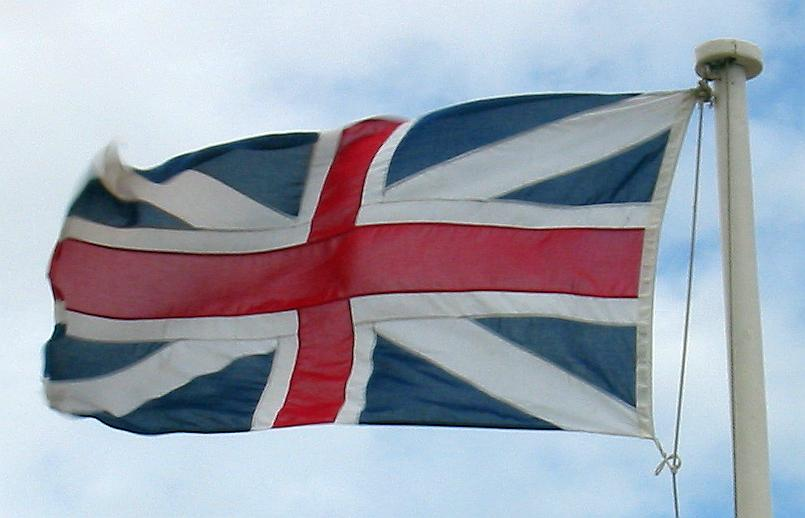
Union Flag used in the Kingdom of England from 1606 and, following the Acts of Union, the flag of the Kingdom of Great Britain from 1707 to 1800.

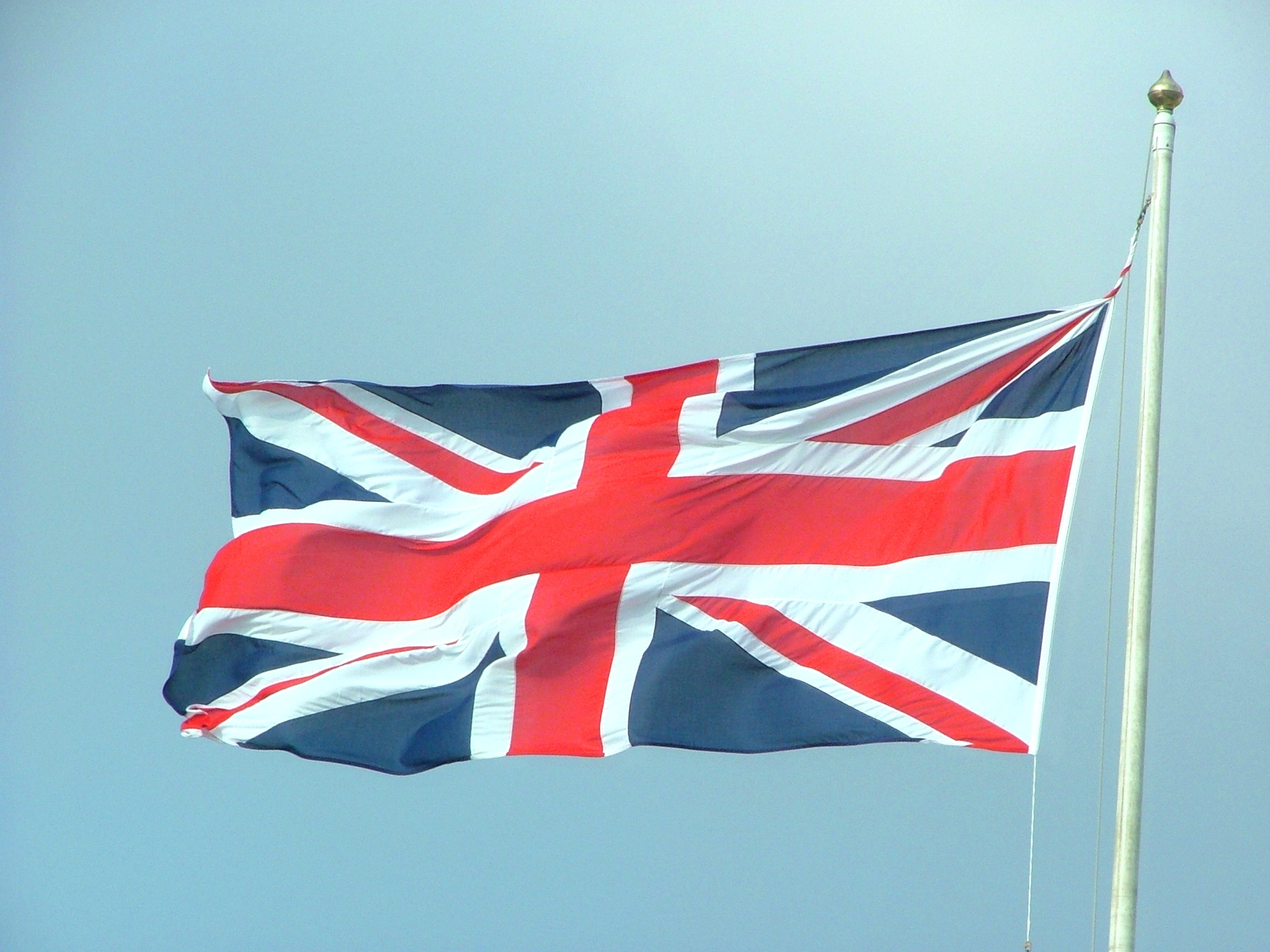
Union Flag since 1801, including the Cross of Saint Patrick, following the Act of Union between the Kingdom of Great Britain and Kingdom of Ireland.

Component flags of the Flag of the United Kingdom: Saint George's Cross, Saltire of St Andrew and Saint Patrick's Saltire.

== Related flags ==
The flag of the Church of Scotland is the flag of Scotland defaced with the burning bush.

Several flags outside of the United Kingdom are based on the Scottish saltire. In Canada, an inverse representation of the flag (i.e. a blue saltire on a white field), combined with the shield from the royal arms of the Kingdom of Scotland, forms the modern flag of the province of Nova Scotia. Nova Scotia (Latin for "New Scotland") was the first colonial venture of the Kingdom of Scotland in the Americas. By contrast, the saltire logo of St. Andrew's First Aid is red on white rather than white on blue, in alteration of the Red Cross. Also, the Colombian department of the Archipelago of San Andrés, Providencia and Santa Catalina uses a pale-blue version because the name of principal island (San Andrés, Saint Andrew), though also by the first settlers from Scottish origin.

The Dutch municipality of Sint-Oedenrode, named after the Scottish princess Saint Oda, uses a version of the flag of Scotland, defaced with a gold castle having on both sides a battlement.

Flag of the Church of Scotland

Flag of Stirling

Flag of the University of Edinburgh

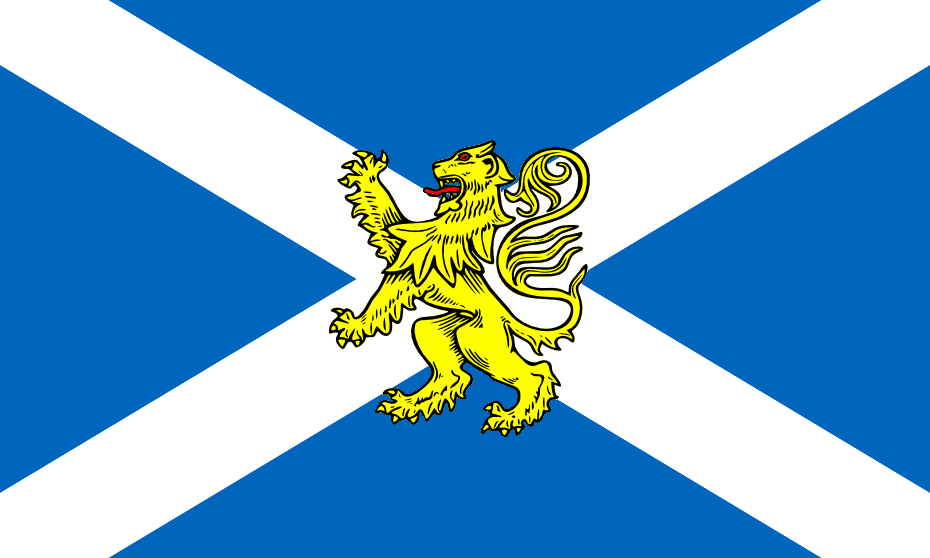
Regimental flag of the Royal Regiment of Scotland

Flag of the Scottish National Antarctic Expedition (1902–1904)

Sledge flag brought by James Wordie on the Imperial Trans-Antarctic Expedition (1914–1917)

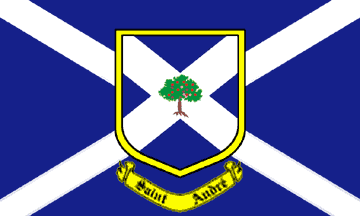
Flag of Saint Andrew, Guernsey

Flag of the Scottish Australian Heritage Council, Australia

Flag of Scotland Island, New South Wales, Australia

Provincial flag of Nova Scotia, Canada

Flag of Sint-Oedenrode, Netherlands

Flag of the Archipelago of San Andrés, Providencia and Santa Catalina department in Colombia.

Flag of Tenerife, Canary Islands, Spain.

== Royal Standard of Scotland ==
Royal Standard of Scotland

The Royal Standard of Scotland, also known as the Banner of the King of Scots or more commonly the Lion Rampant of Scotland, is the Scottish Royal Banner of Arms. Used historically by the King of Scots, the Royal Standard of Scotland differs from Scotland's national flag, the Saltire, in that its correct use is restricted by an Act of the Parliament of Scotland to only a few Great Officers of State who officially represent The Sovereign in Scotland. However, a 1934 Royal Warrant for George V's silver jubilee which authorised waving of hand-held versions continues to be relied upon by fans at sports events and other public occasions. It is also used in an official capacity at Royal residences in Scotland when the Sovereign is not present.

== In Unicode ==
Twemoji typeface Flag of Scotland, (as per X)

In 2017, the Unicode Consortium approved emoji support for the flag of Scotland, alongside the flags of England and Wales, in Unicode version 10.0 and Emoji version 5.0. This was following a proposal from Jeremy Burge of Emojipedia and Owen Williams of BBC Wales in March 2016,

The flag is implemented using the regional indicator symbol sequence GB-SCT, so 🏴󠁧󠁢󠁳󠁣󠁴󠁿 requires a total of 7 code points: U+1F3F4 🏴 WAVING BLACK FLAG U+E0067 TAG LATIN SMALL LETTER G U+E0062 TAG LATIN SMALL LETTER B U+E0073 TAG LATIN SMALL LETTER S U+E0063 TAG LATIN SMALL LETTER C U+E0074 TAG LATIN SMALL LETTER T U+E007F CANCEL TAG. Prior to this update, The Daily Telegraph reported that users had "been able to send emojis of the Union Flag, but not of the individual nations".

== Gallery ==
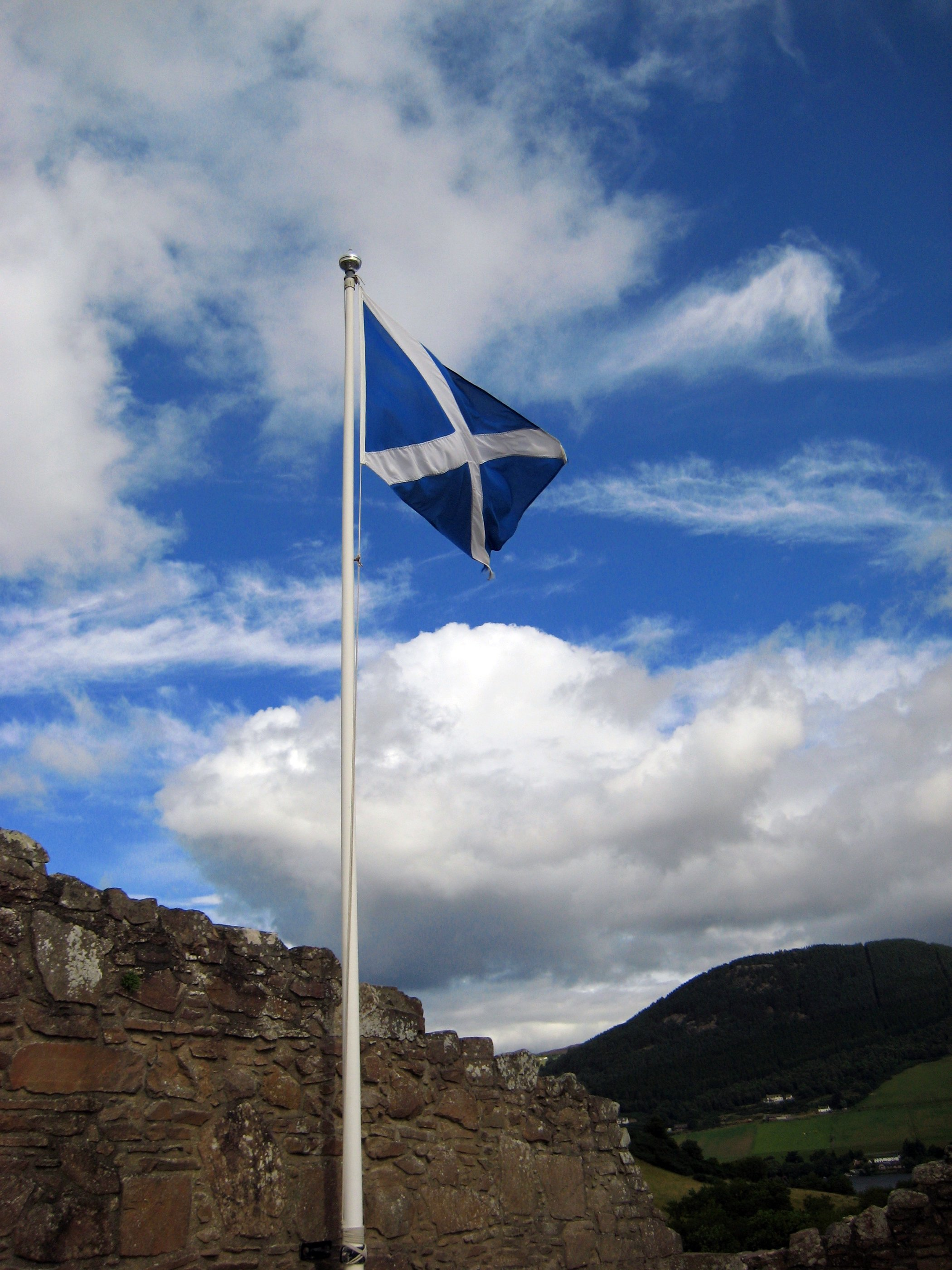
The Saltire, the national flag of Scotland: a white (argent) saltire on a blue (azure) field.

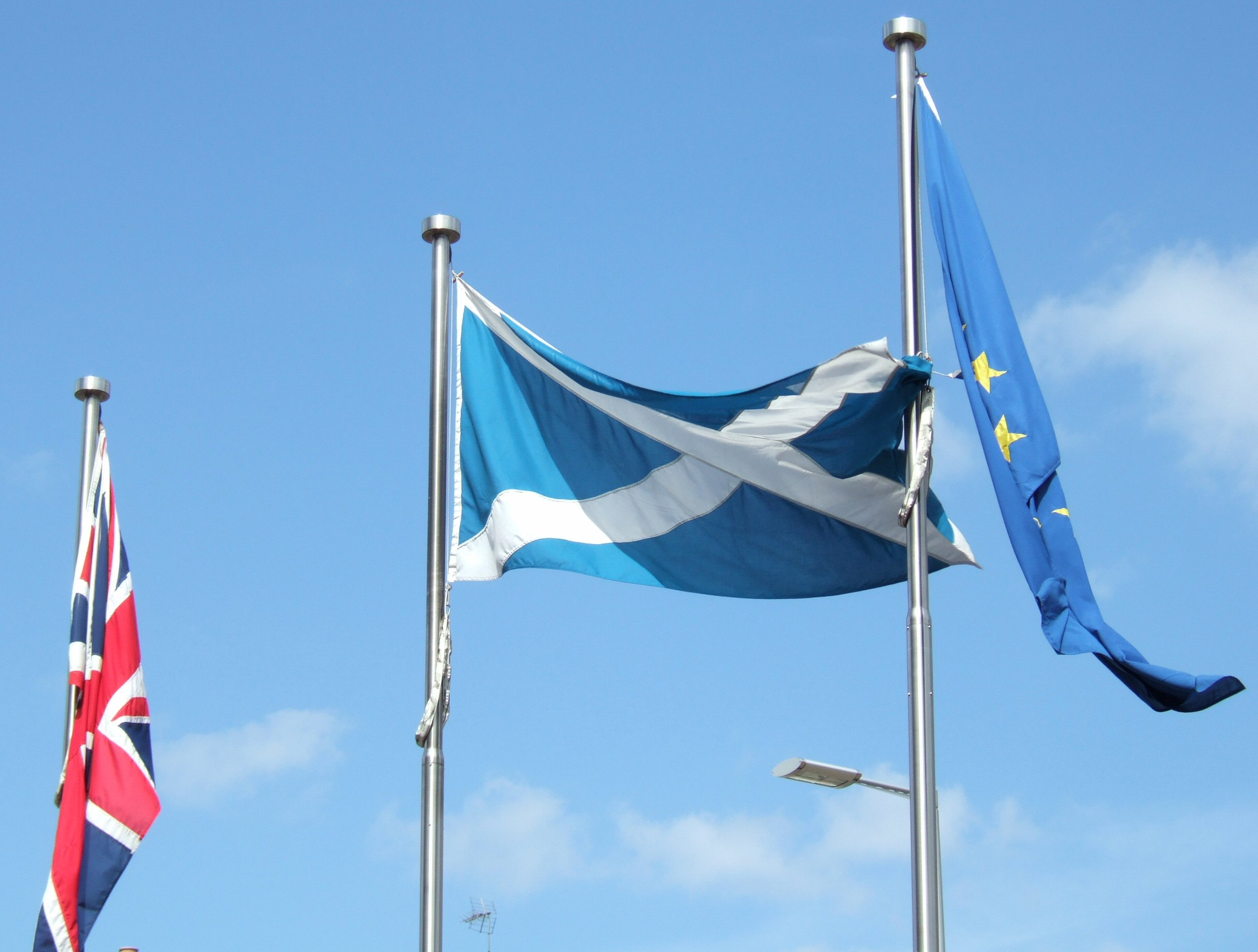
The Flag of the United Kingdom, Flag of Scotland and Flag of Europe at the Scottish Parliament Building.

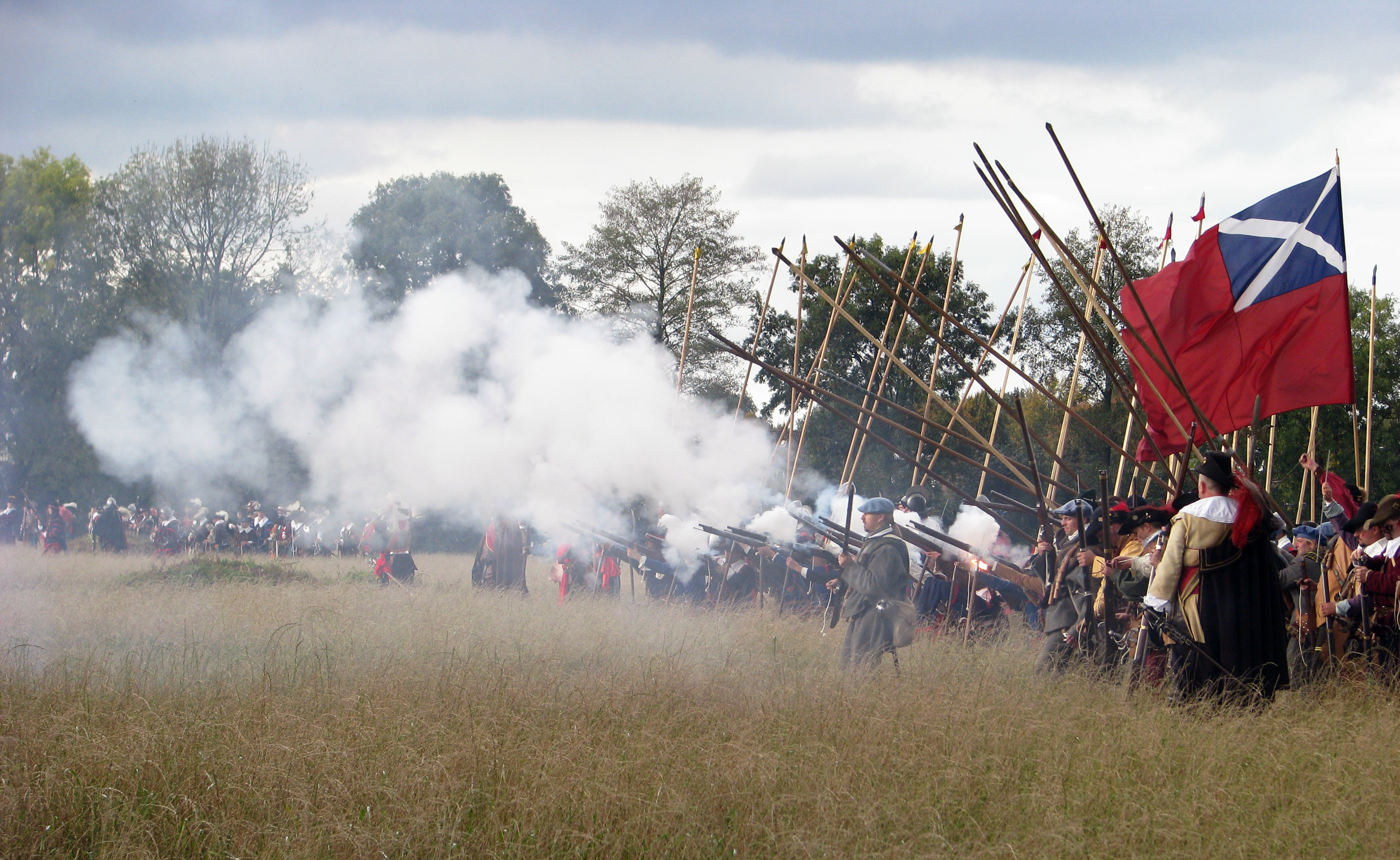
The Scottish Red Ensign at a historical reenactment of the Battle for Grolle.

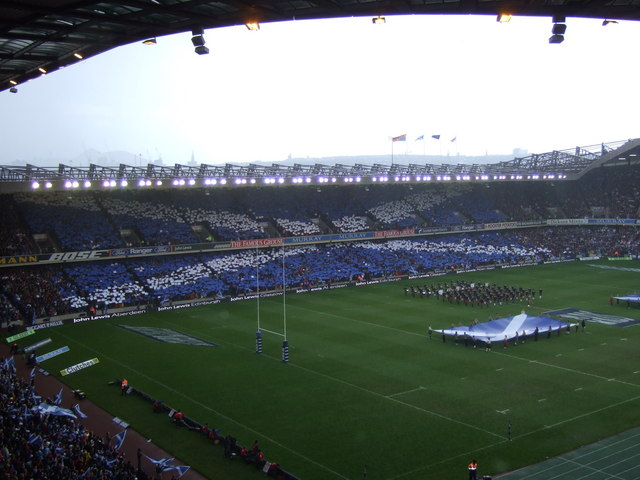
A variety of Saltires at Murrayfield Stadium; the national stadium of Rugby Union in Scotland.

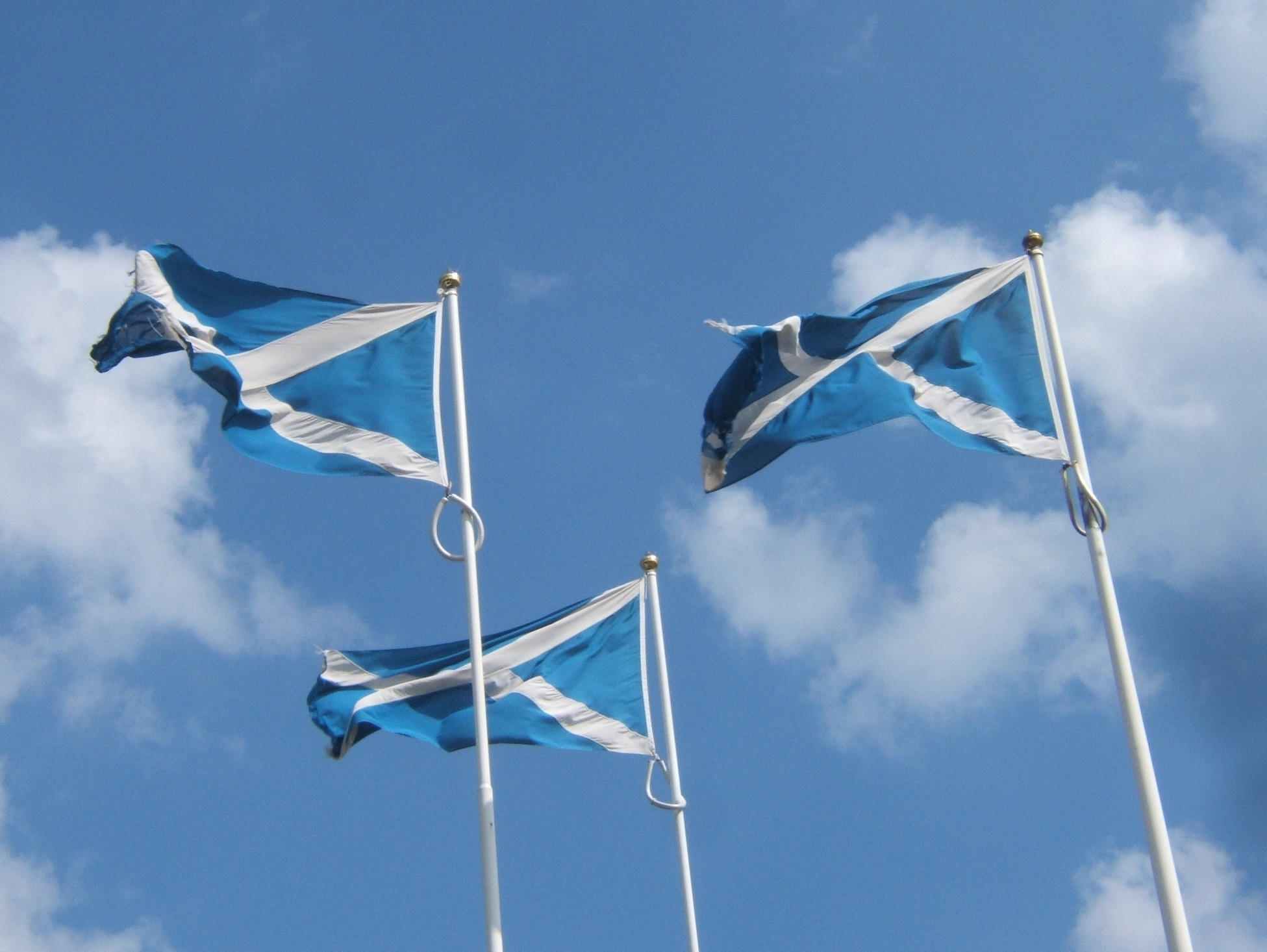
Three flags of Scotland marking the Anglo-Scottish Border.

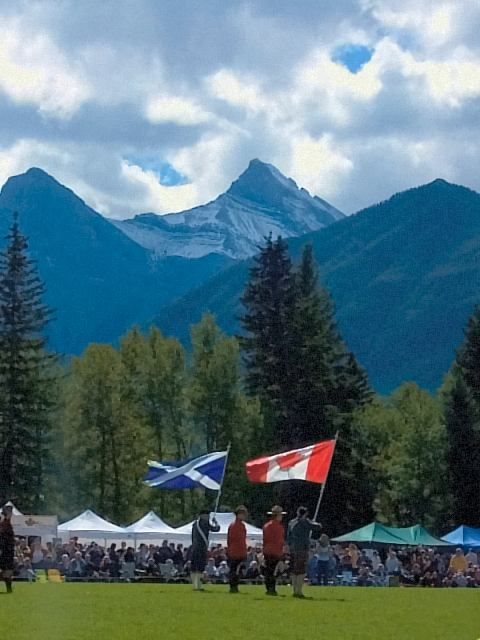
The flag of Scotland and flag of Canada at the Canmore Highland Games.

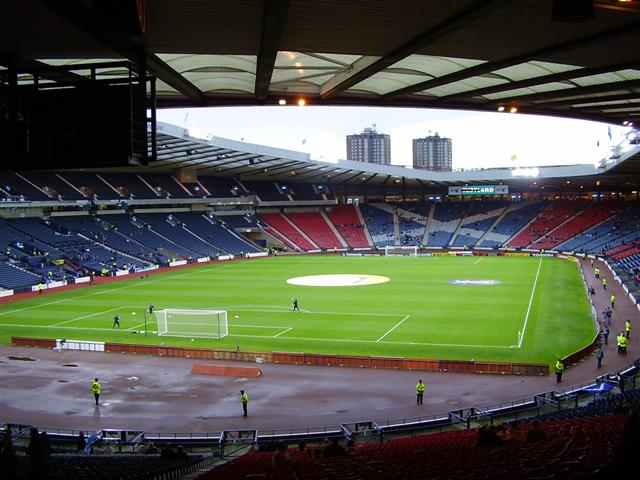
The flag of Scotland seating design at Hampden Park Stadium; the national stadium of Football in Scotland.

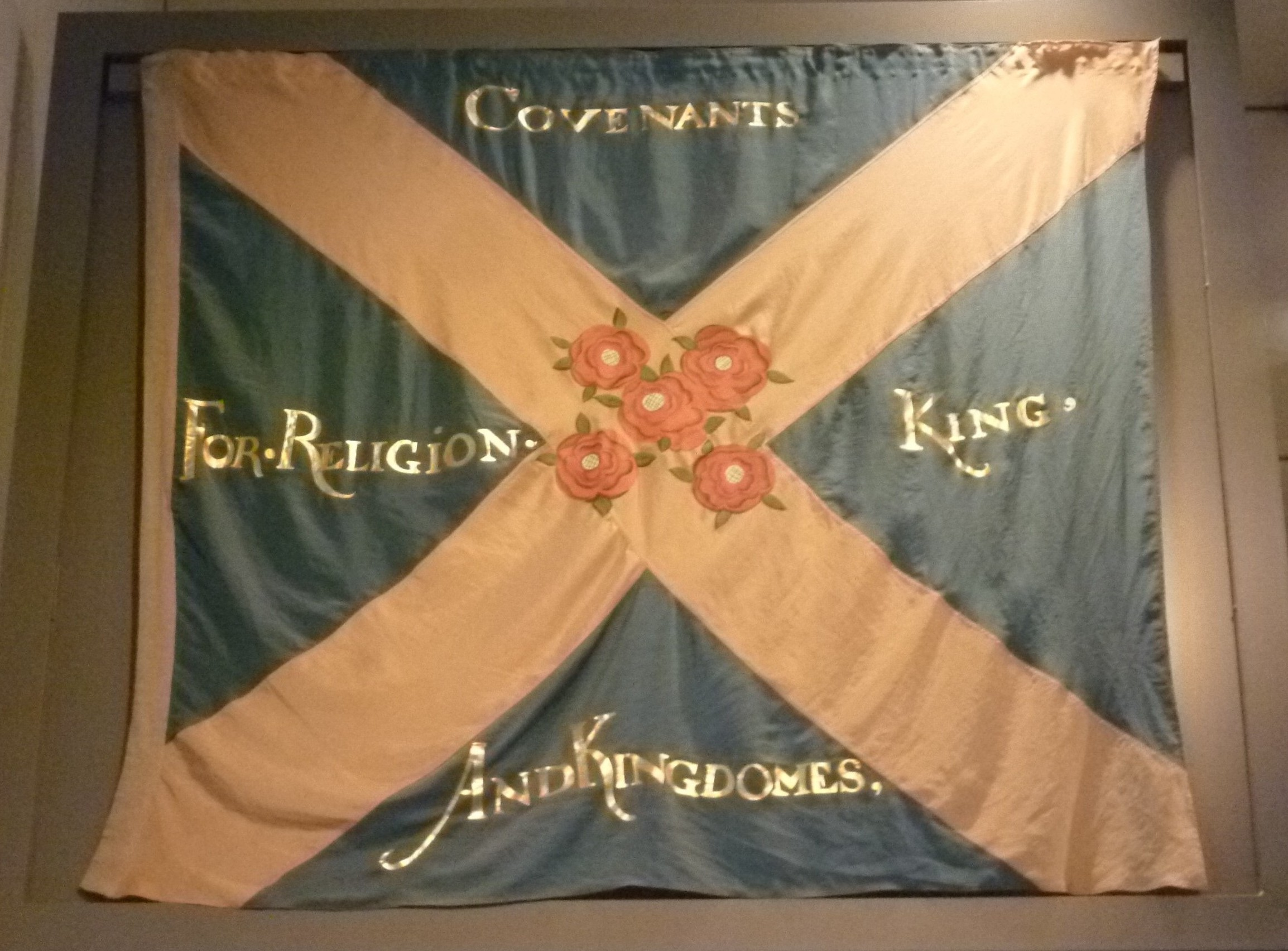
A replica 17th-century Covenanters' flag.

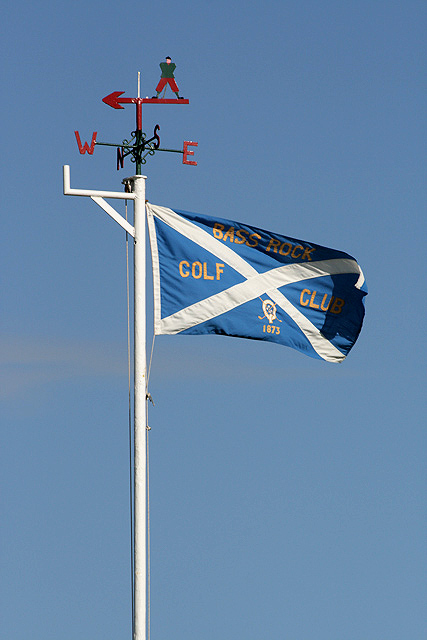
A defaced Saltire belonging to the Bass Rock golf club, North Berwick.

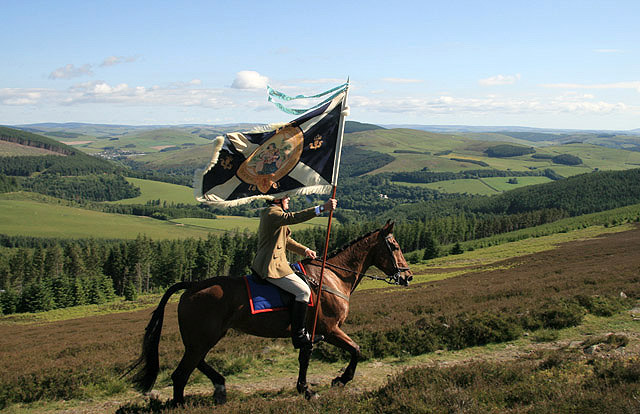
The defaced Saltire of the Royal Burgh of Selkirk leading the Common Riding.

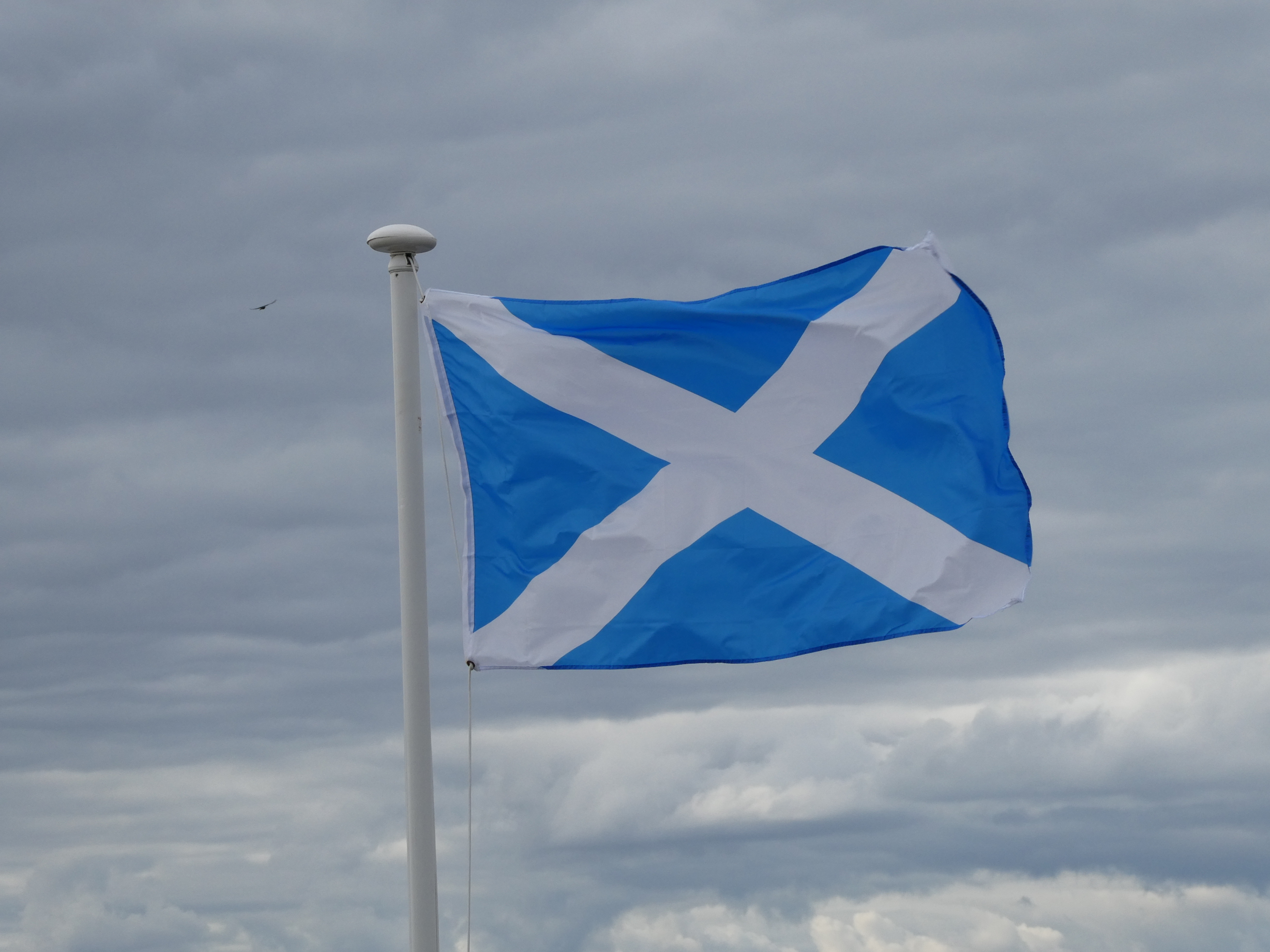
The flag of Scotland (3:5 proportion)

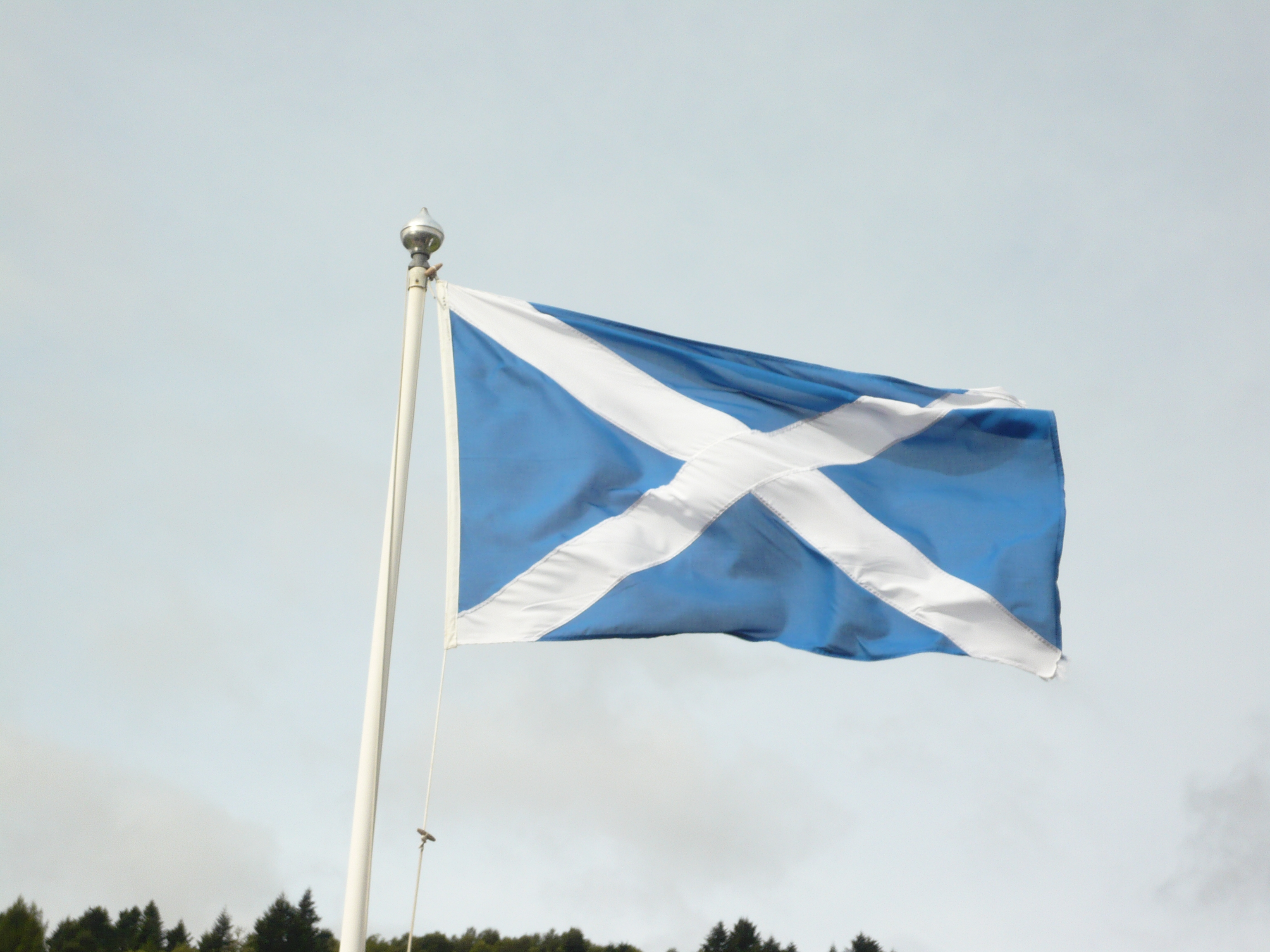
The flag of Scotland (2:3 proportion)

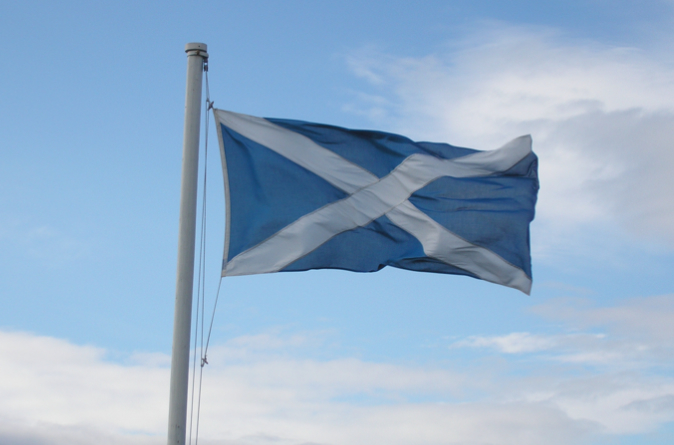
The flag of Scotland (1:2 proportion)

== See also ==
- List of Scottish flags
- Royal coat of arms of Scotland
- Bearer of the National Flag of Scotland
- List of British flags
- Flags of Europe
- Flag of Quebec
- Flag of Tenerife
