= Đorđe Andrejević Kun =

Yugoslav painter (1904–1964)

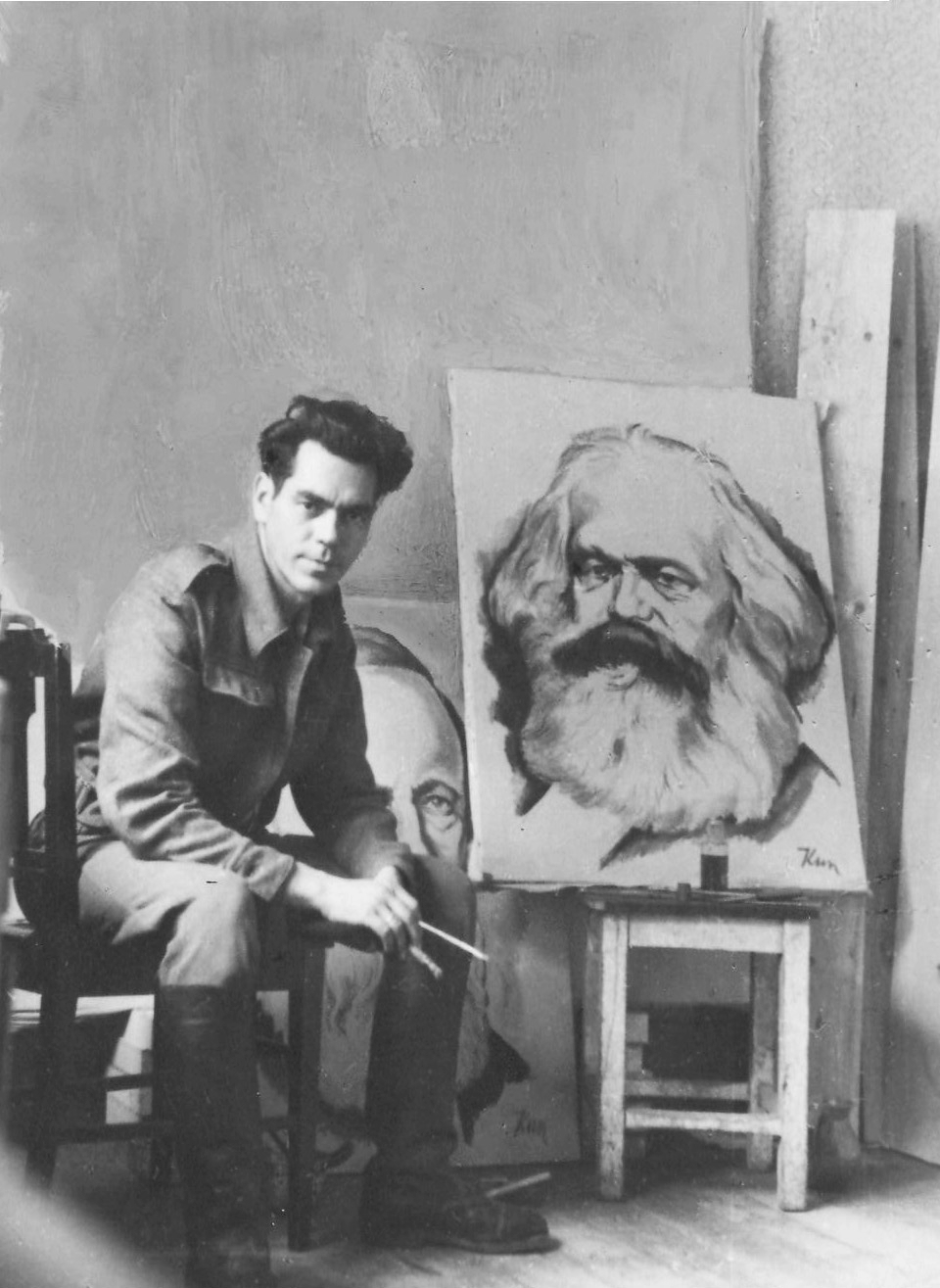
- Born: 31 March 1904; Breslau, Kingdom of Prussia
- Died: 17 January 1964 (aged 59); Belgrade, SR Serbia, Yugoslavia
- Education: Belgrade Academy of Art
- Known for: Painting, Graphic arts
- Notable work: Coat of arms of Belgrade (1931); Emblem of Yugoslavia (1943); Partisans(Partizani) (1945); Emblem of SR Serbia (1947)
- Spouse: Nada Andrejević Kun (m. 1931)
- Children: Mira Kun (b. 1935)
- Awards: Yugoslav Federation Prize for Graphics (1946); Yugoslav Federation Prize for Painting (1949)
- Elected: Serbian Academy of Sciences and Arts

Personal details
- Party: League of Communists of Yugoslavia (1939 — 1964)

Military service
- Branch/service: International Brigades; Yugoslav Partisans
- Battles/wars: Spanish Civil War; National Liberation War in Yugoslavia
- Awards: Order of the People's Hero; Order of Brotherhood and Unity; Order of Labour; Order of Bravery; Commemorative Medal of the Partisans of 1941

Đorđe Andrejević Kun (Serbian Cyrillic: Ђорђе Андрејевић Кун; 31 March 1904 – 17 January 1964) was a Serbian and Yugoslav painter and graphic artist, a participant in the Spanish Civil War and the National Liberation War in Yugoslavia and a member of the Serbian Academy of Sciences and Arts. He is known for his paintings, graphic designs and woodcuts. He designed the coat of arms of Belgrade, the emblem of the Socialist Federal Republic of Yugoslavia, the emblem of the Socialist Republic of Serbia and several Yugoslav orders and medals.

== Biography ==
=== Early life ===
Kun was born on 31 March 1904 in Wrocław, Kingdom of Prussia (now Wroclaw, Poland), to Veljko Andrejević Kun and his wife Gertruda as the fourth of five children. Veljko was a graphic artist who moved to Germany in 1892 where he studied engraving. Đorde started displaying artistic talent at an early age. The Andrejević family moved to Belgrade in 1914, where Veljko opened a printing house in Balkanska Street. After completing primary school, Đorđe completed four grades of high school and, in accordance to his father's wishes, learned the printing trade.

=== Studies and early works ===
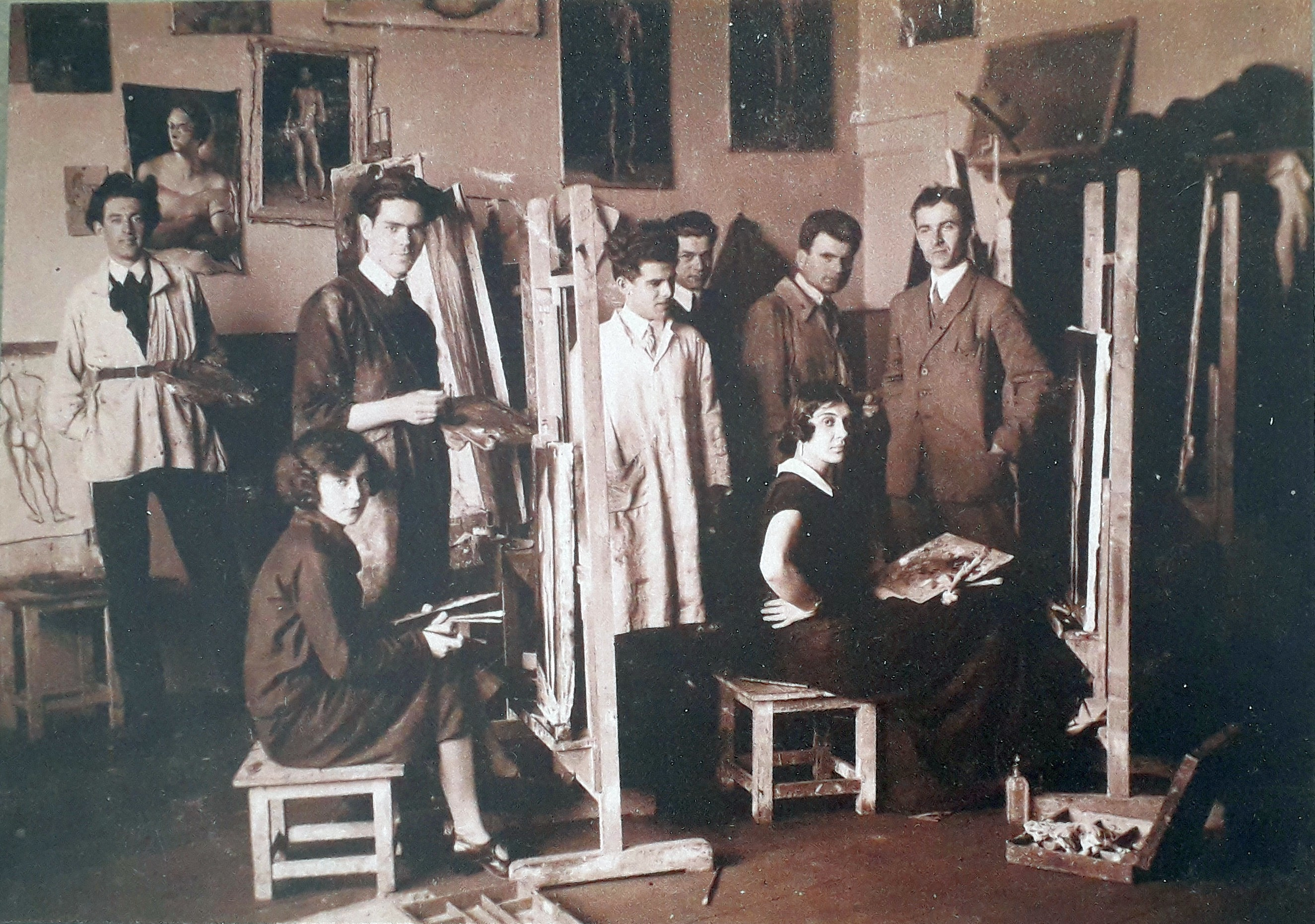
Kun (second from left) at the Royal Art School in Belgrade, 1921–1925

Between 1921 and 1925, Kun studied painting at the Royal Art School in Belgrade, where he was taught by painters Petar Dobrović, Ljuba Ivanović and Milan Milovanović. Among his classmates were Stanislav Staša Beložanski, Anton Huter, Momčilo Moma Stevnović, Stanka Lučev and others. Milovanović and Ivanović in particular influenced Kun's artistic development, which is why later in his artistic career he wavered between form and color and between painting and graphics, while Dobrović had an influence on his social involvement.

Thanks to a Belgrade benefactor, merchant lijia Rankic, he received a scholarship to study painting in Italy. For two full years, between 1925 and 1927, he stayed in Rome, Florence, Milan and Venice, where he studied, painted and visited museums and galleries. During his training in Italy, he painted copies of Renaissance and Baroque paintings, namely those of Michelangelo, Tītian, Veronese, and Tintoretto, which he sent to his benefactor. After Italy, he continued his third year of studies in Paris, where he studied contemporary artists Cézanne, Modigliani and the Bulgarian painter Gilles Paskin. During this period Kun started selling his first paintings, which are kept in private collections.

After returning to Belgrade in 1929, Kun took part in the autumn exhibition of Belgrade artists. This was one of his first public appearances. Critics praised Kun's skillful composition, but criticized his use of dark, earthy colors. During the next two years, he participated in spring and autumn exhibitions at the Cvijeta Zuzorić Art Pavilion in Kalemegdan, where the audience could see about a dozen of his compositions, portraits, still life paintings, self-portraits and landscapes. In February 1931, he had his first solo exhibition at the Art Pavilion, dominated by two themes — still life and self-portraits.

In September of the same year, he participated in an anonymous competition to design the coat of arms of Belgrade, in which 56 artists from all over Yugoslavia took part. The competition ended in November, and Kun's work under the title Crvena trojka (Red Triptych) was awarded the first prize of five thousand dinars. His design became the official coat of arms of Belgrade, which is still used today. The same year Kun married Nada Ratković, an art history student at the Faculty of Philosophy in Belgrade, whom he met in 1925. During her studies, Nada was a member of a Marxist Club and, due to her communist activities, was arrested and brought before the State Court, but was released due to lack of evidence. Đorđe and Nada first lived in Čubura, and in 1935, after their daughter Mira was born, they moved to Kun's studio in the attic of the Vojislav llić Elementary School in Vračar, where they lived until 1937.

=== Social artistry ===
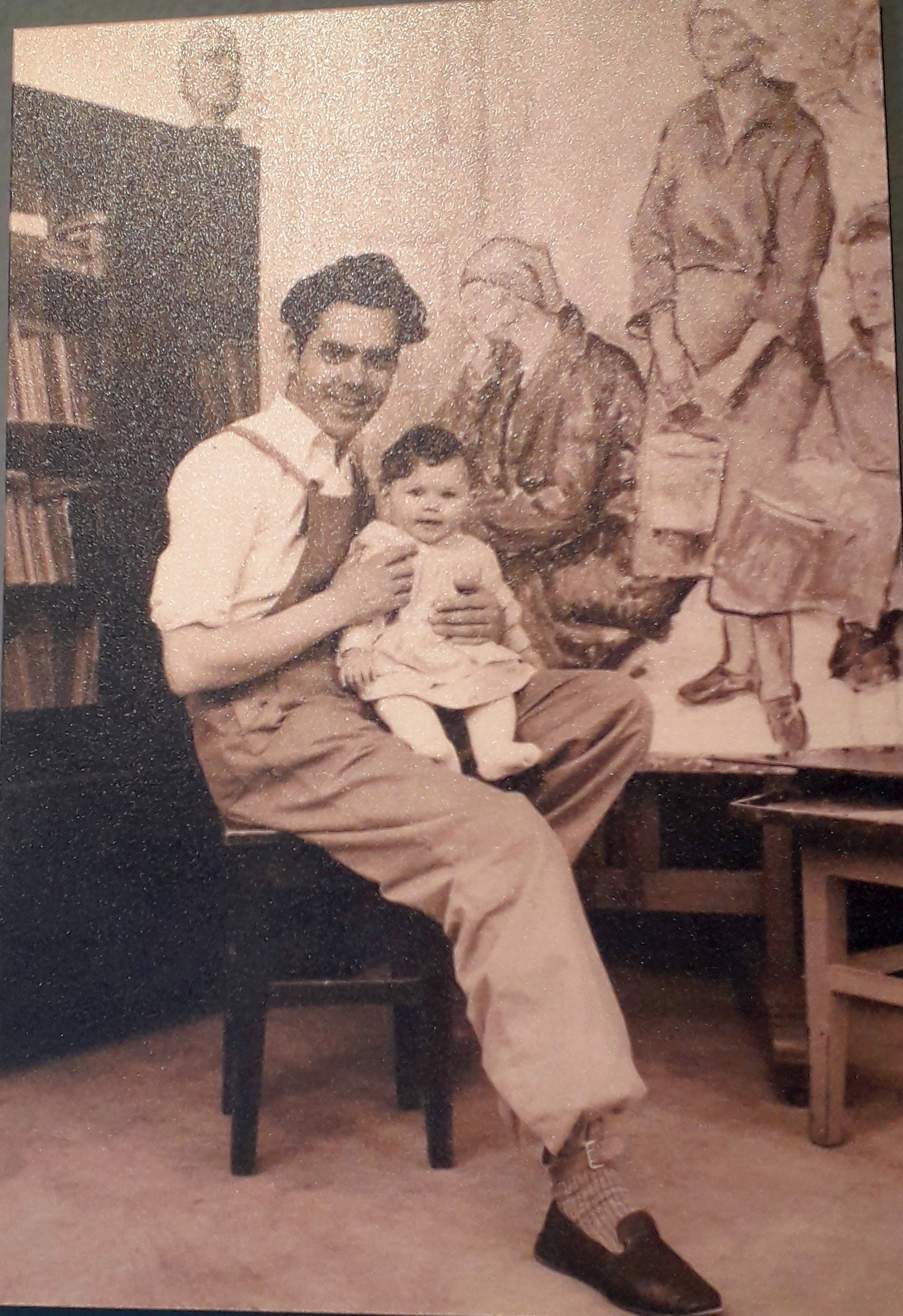
Kun with his daughter Mira in his studio, 1936

While an apprentice in his father workshop, Đorde liked to socialise with the workers, and he subsequently joined the Association of Graphic Workers. In 1923 he painted a poster for the International Workers' Day celebration, which was printed and put up around the city and in streetcars. Kun's interest in left-wing ideas and communism most likely arose during his stay in Paris, where he received books on Lenin and the Soviet Union from friends. Through his wife Nada he began to associate with communists and members of the then illegal Communist Party of Yugoslavia (KPJ). Left-wing ideas did not affect his artistic expression prior to 1934. The conference of the International Association of Revolutionary Writers, held in 1930 in Kharkiv, and the First Congress of Soviet Writers, held in August 1934 in Moscow, defined the concept of socialist realism, an artistic style with the aim of spreading communist and socialist ideas, which highly influenced Kun's artistic output from that point onwards.

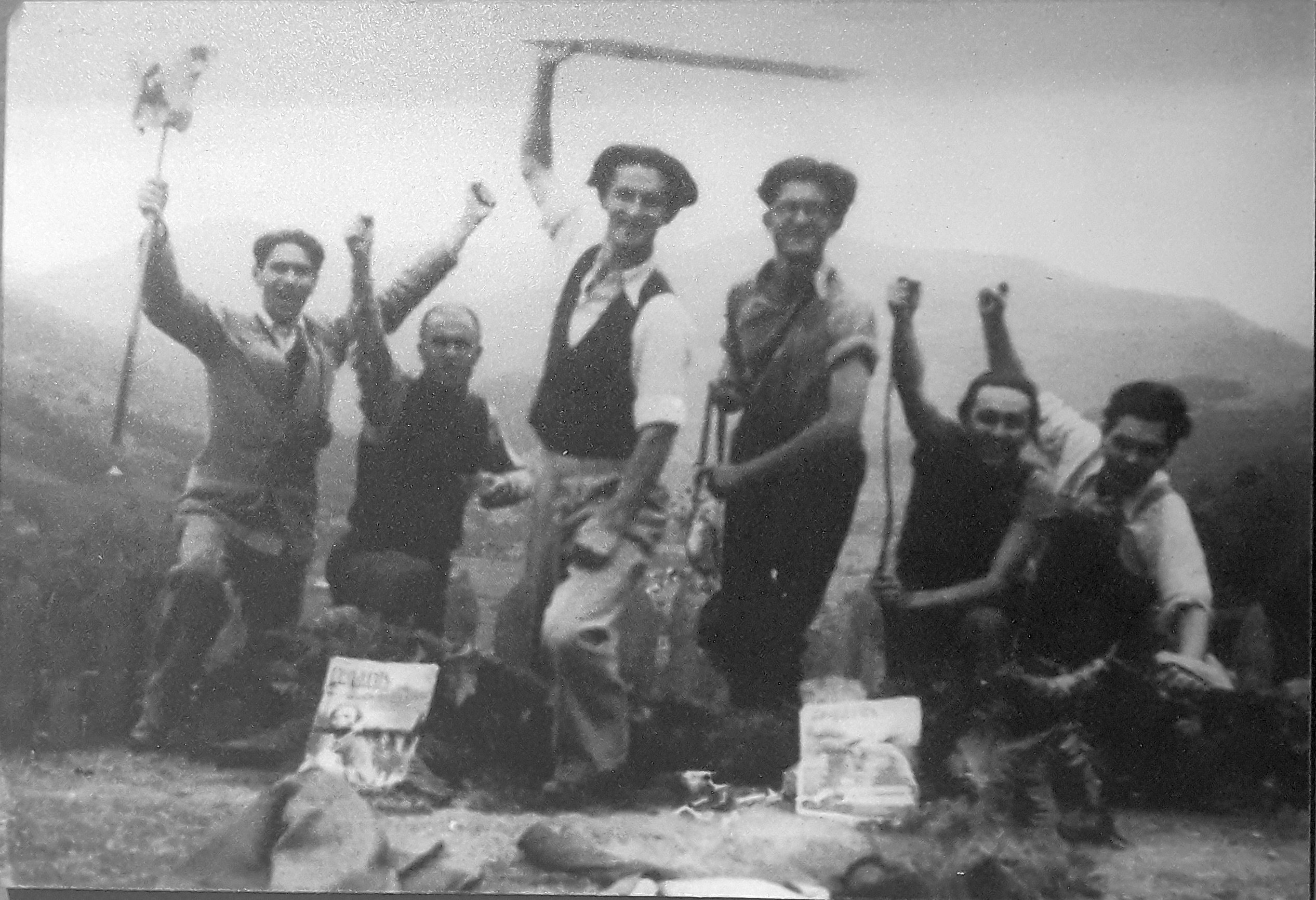
Kun (furthest right) with Vojkan Jeremić, Petar Stambolić, Milenko Kušić, Fikret and Radojica Živanović Noe in Ivanjica, 1936

From 1931 to 1934, Kun was a member of the art association Oblik, one of the most significant art groups in interwar Yugoslavia, whose members included painters Branko Popović, Petar Dobrović, Jovan Bijelić, Sava Šumanović, Veljko Stanojević, Milo Milunović and Marino Tartalja. As a member of Oblik, Kun exhibited his works until 1934, when, together with a group of like-minded leftist artists, he founded the art group Život, whose members were painters Mirko Kujačić, Dragan Beraković, Đurđe Teodorović, Radojica Živanović Noe, as well as sculptors Vladeta Piperski and Stevan Bodnarov. They defined their art as "combative realism" and were against I'art pour l'art, accepting socialist realism as their artistic direction. They maintained ties with the Zagreb group Zemlja, which was banned in 1935. A group of artists, led by Bodnarov, Beraković, Kujačić and Kun, submitted a Resolution on the financial situation of artists, demanding certain concessions for renting the exhibition space of the Kalemegdan Art Pavilion and changing the selection criteria of works for their exhibitions. Their demands were rejected and they subsequently boycotted the 1936 autumn exhibition, and later that year held a boycott exhibition at the Technical Faculty in Belgrade.

Kun aimed to depict the daily life of workers in his art as a way to fight against class injustice. He returned to making graphics which he deemed the most suitable medium. In the summer of 1934, together with his wife, he traveled to Bor with the aim of making a "collection of graphics depicting miners". The mine in Bor, then owned by a French company, was not fenced off and Kun could freely visit the mining facilities; the open pit and the smelter, as well as workshops. While collecting material for his work, he was caught by a mining supervisor who reported him to the police. At the police hearing, he was warned not to visit the mine without a permit and was ordered to leave the city. He took refuge in Zaječar, and then illegally returned to Bor. He spent a month collecting material, taking photographs and drawing sketches of the mine and its workers.

After returning to Belgrade, he created a set of graphics titled Blood-soaked Gold (Krvavo zlato) with the aim of displaying the lives of Yugoslav miners and workers. Although the collection was finished, he was unable to find a printer in Belgrade who would print his work. He printed 10 copies of the collection in his studio in 1936. With the help of architecture student Voja Midić, he reached printer Jovan Luks from Stari Bečej, who agreed to print the collection. In January 1937, the first 250 copies were printed, and soon after, a second edition of 1,000 copies was published, which the writer Jovan Popović wrote the foreword for. The map of graphics depicting the difficult daily life of miners and arduous work, as well as the dissolute life of profiteers, was banned by the Belgrade City Administration in February 1937.

Blood-soaked Gold (Krvavo zlato), woodcut set (1937)

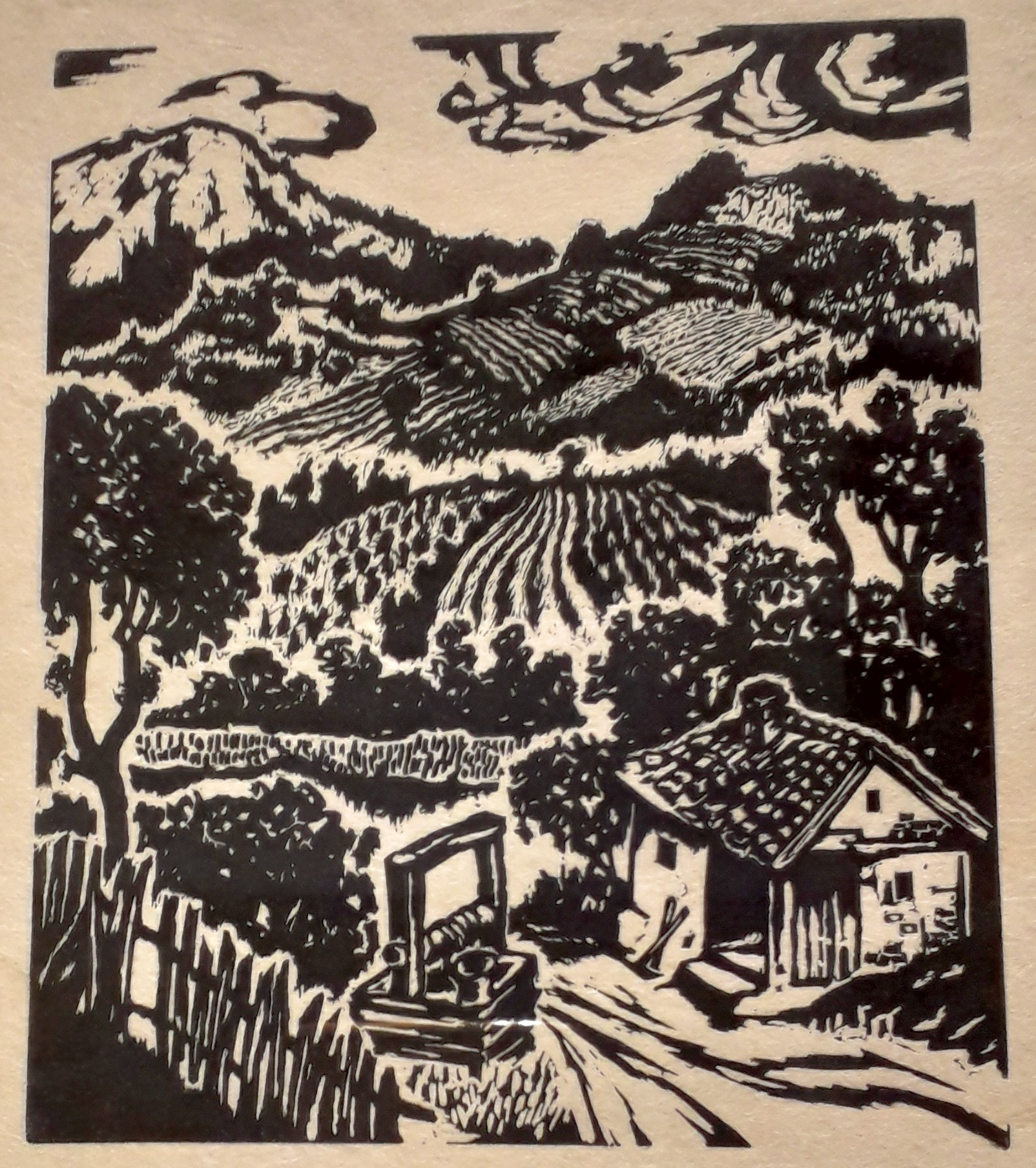

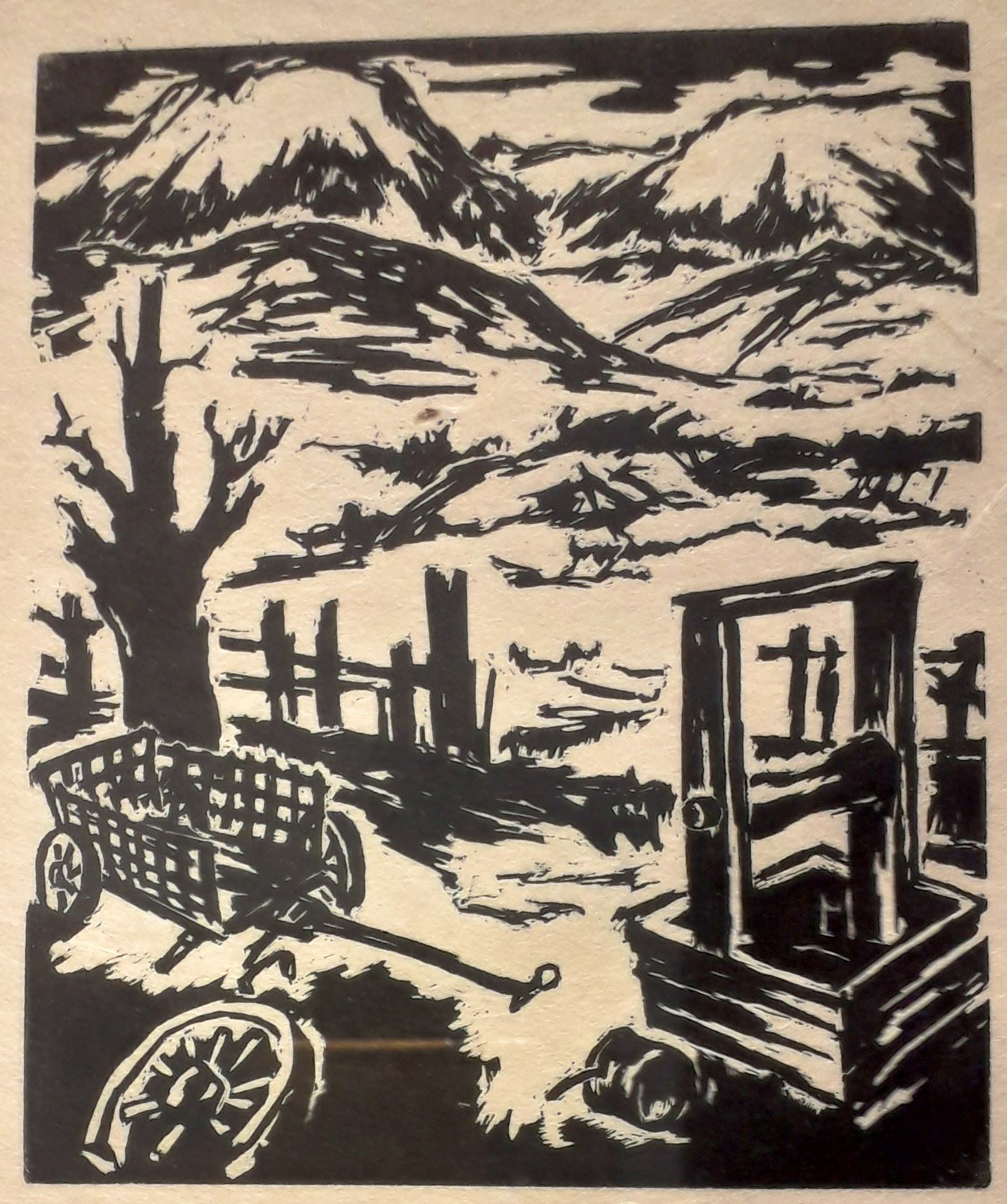

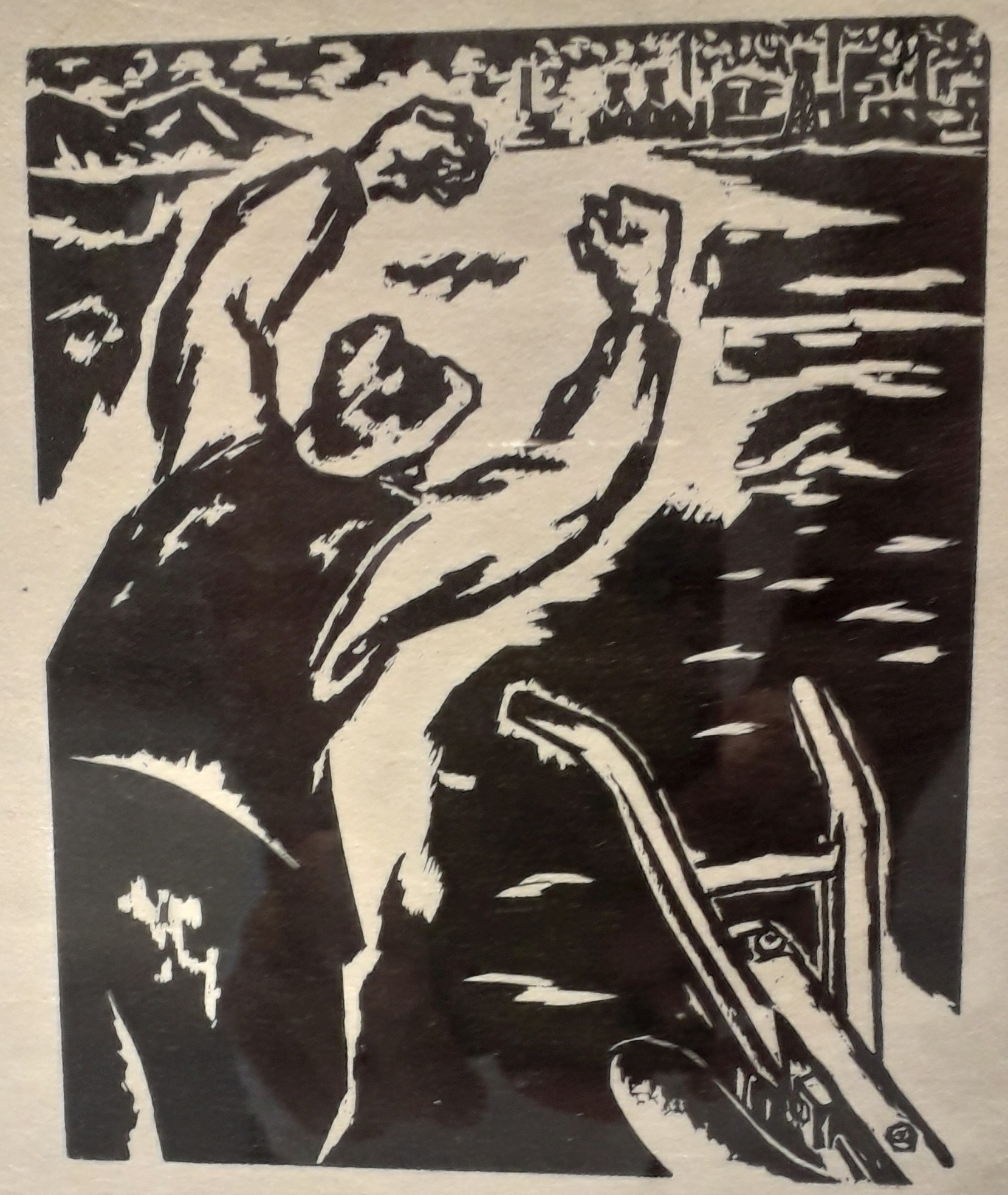

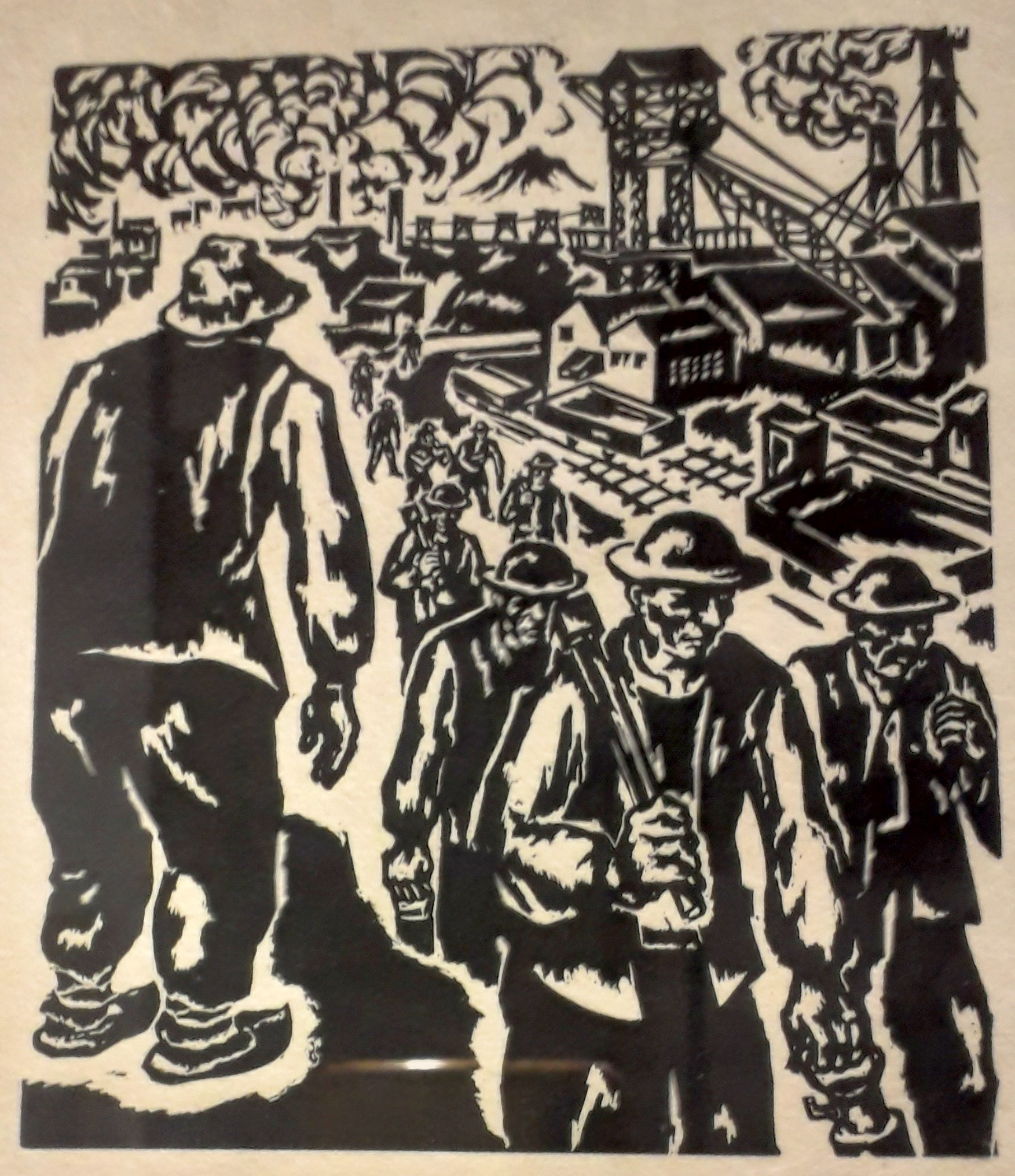

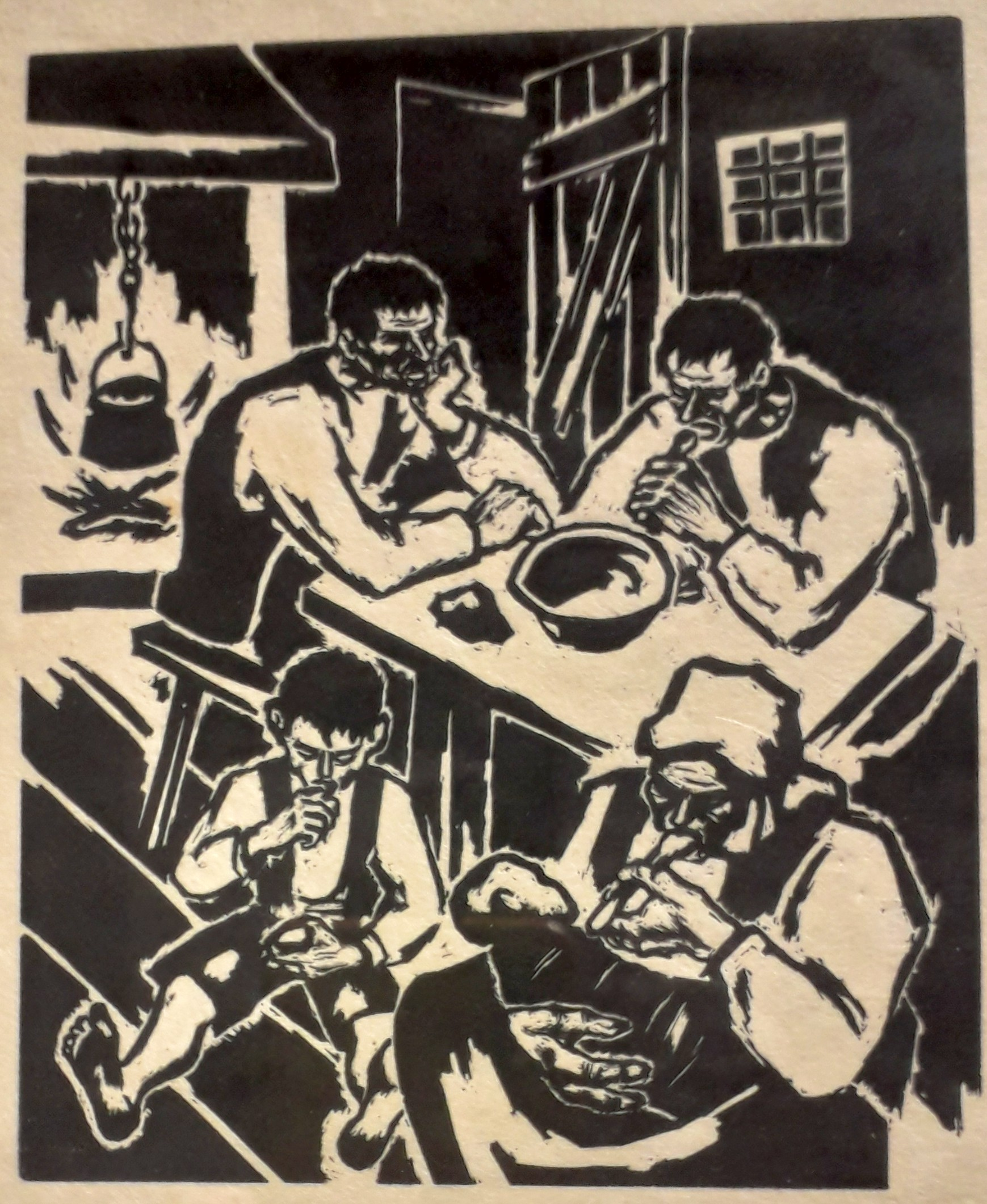

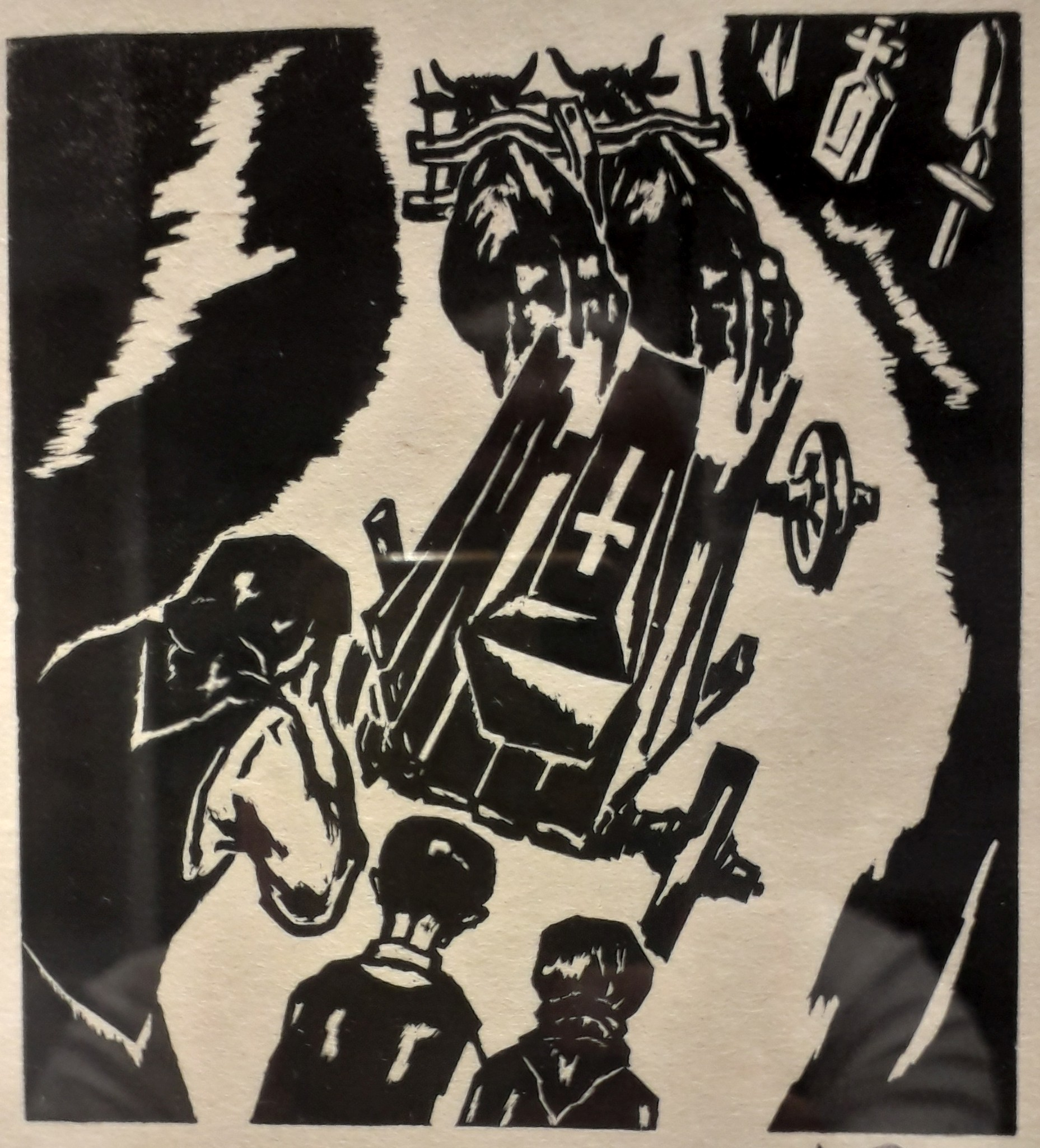

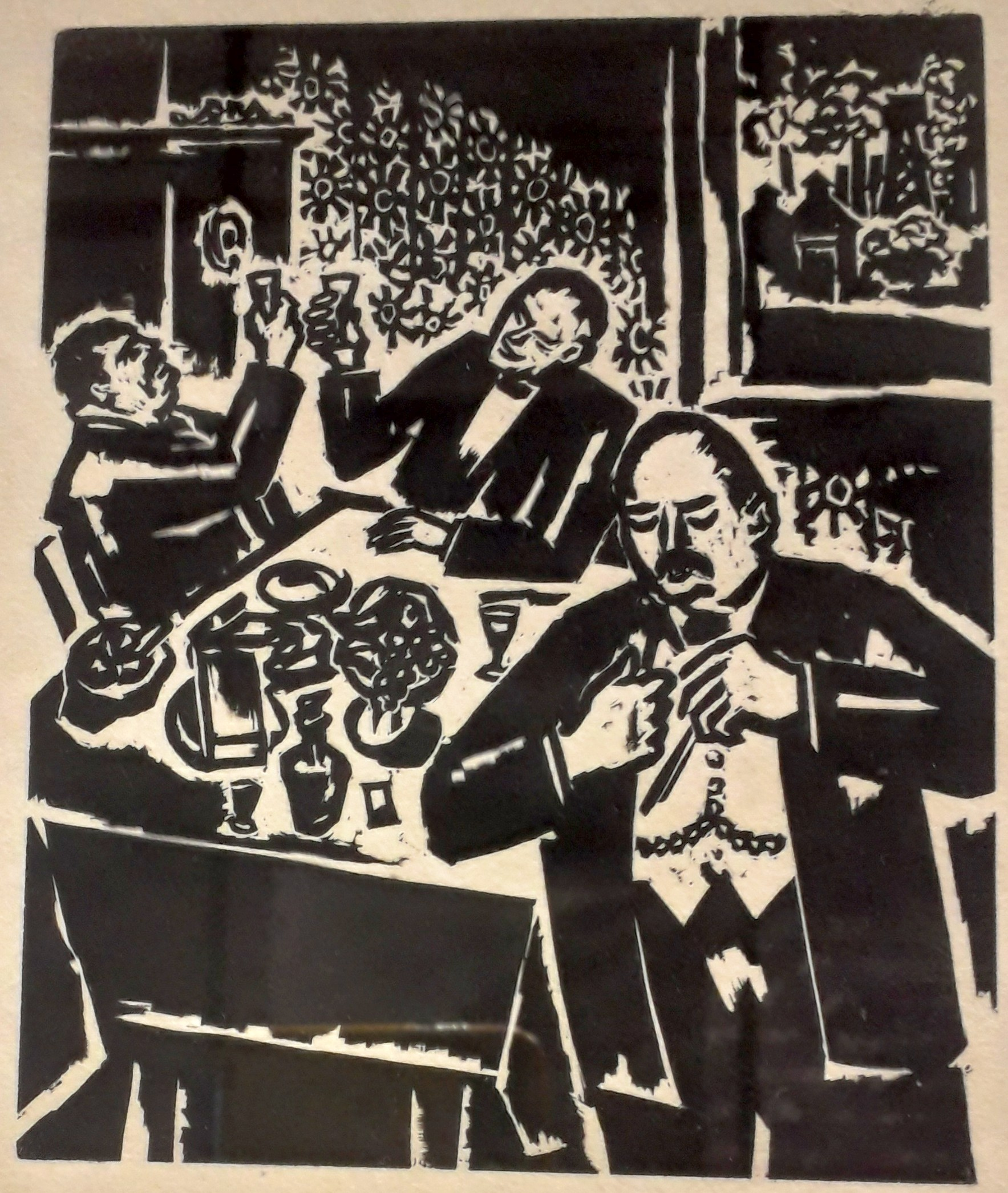

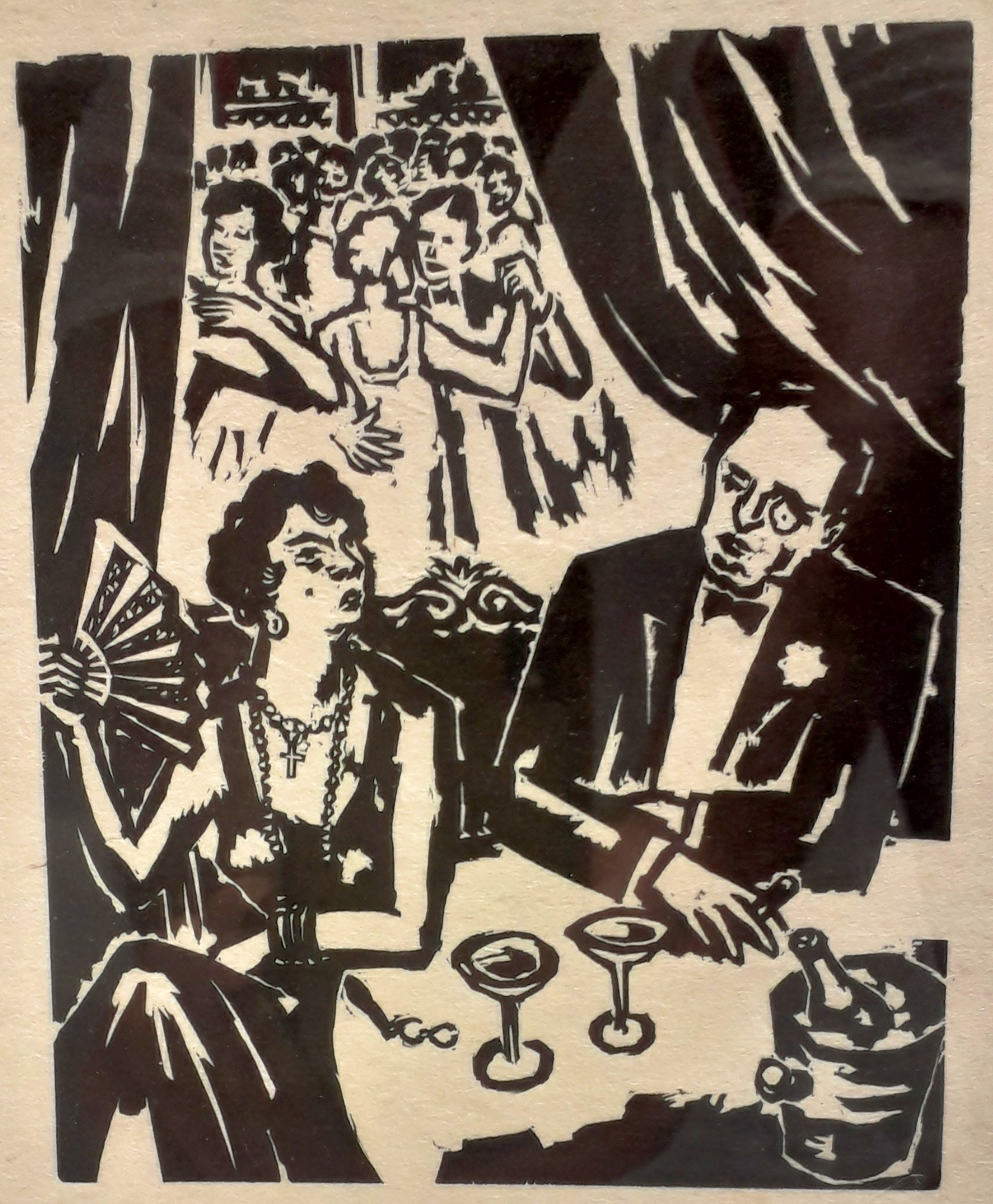

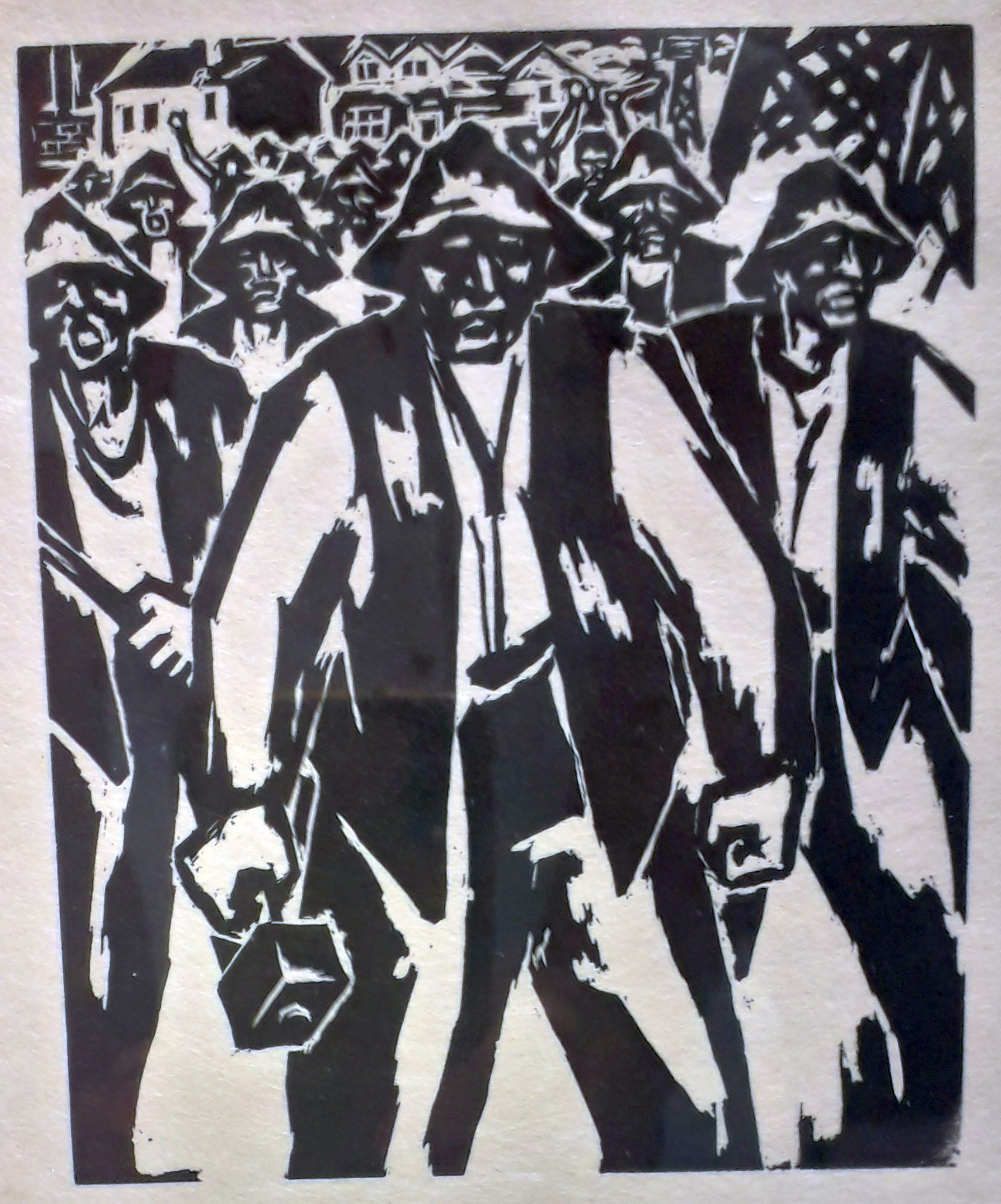

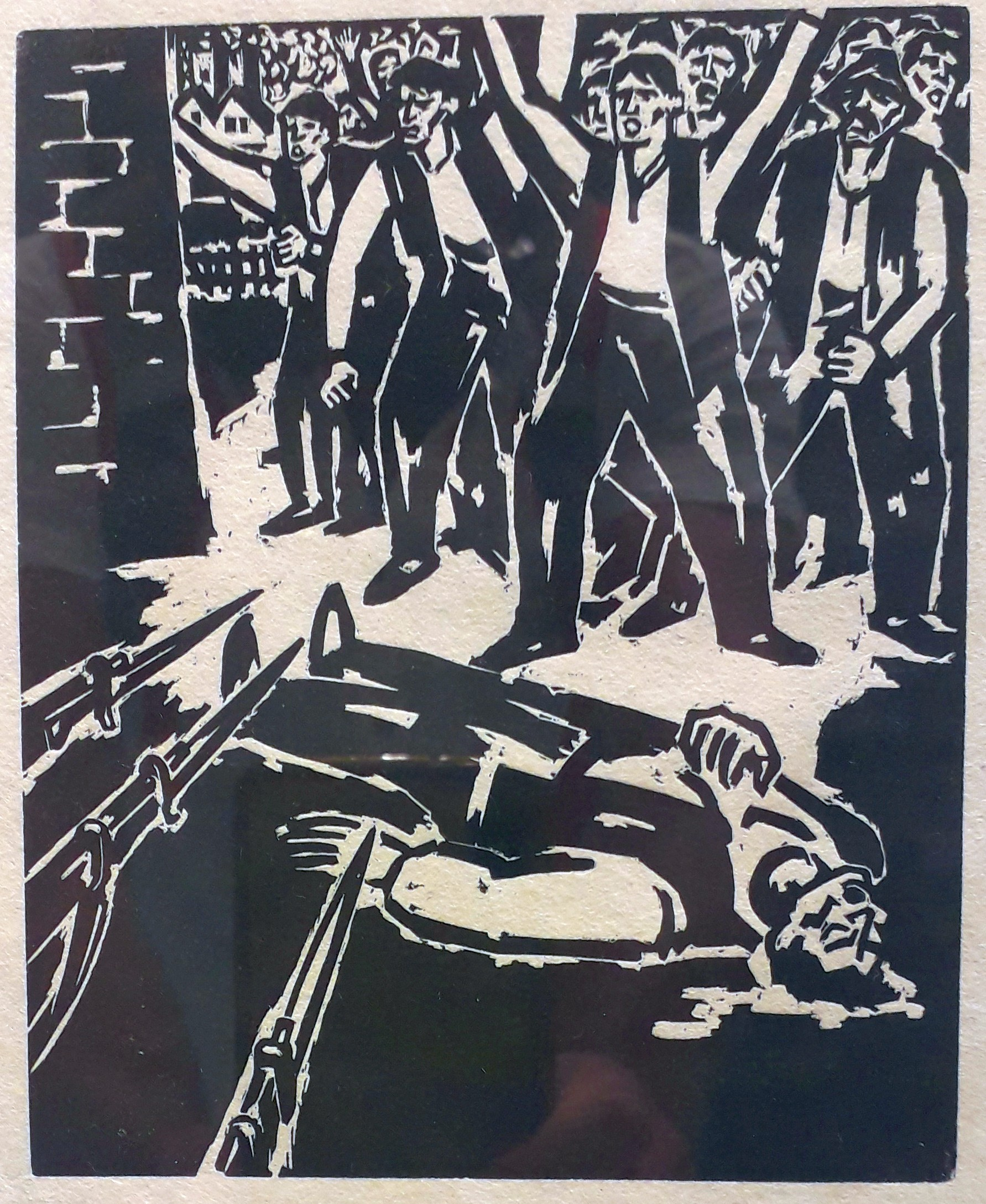

=== Involvement in the Spanish Civil War ===
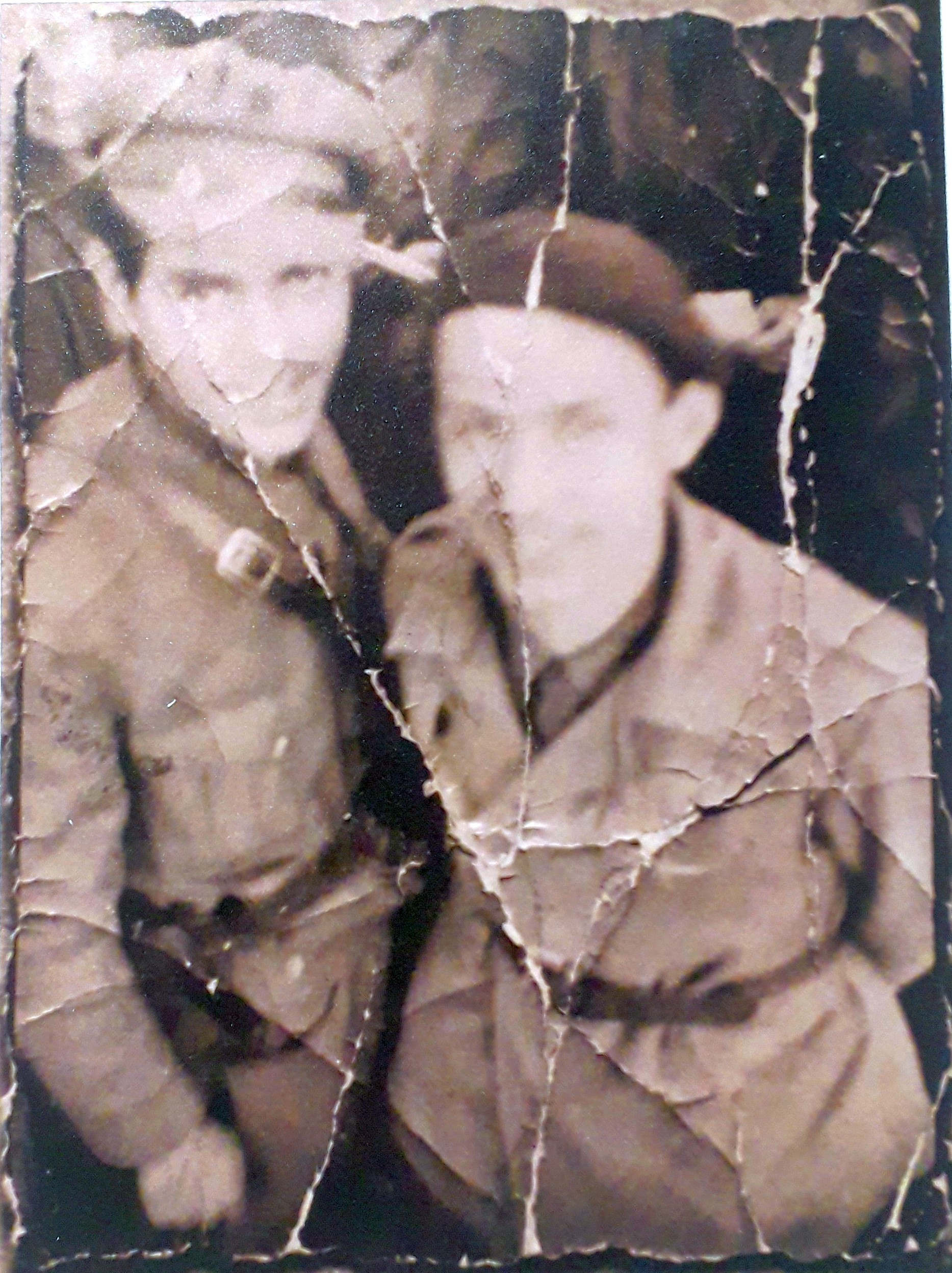
Kun (left) with another volunteer in Spain, 1937

In 1936, international anti-fascist forces started joining Spanish Republicans in the fight against Francisco Franco's nationalist forces during the Spanish Civil War. In November of the same year, the Communist Party of Yugoslavia sent an invitation to all Yugoslav communists and anti-fascists to join the fight. between May and June 1937. students at the University of Belgrade organized a week of solidarity with the Spanish people, during which money was collected for the aid of volunteers leaving for Spain. For the event, Kun painted the character of little Anita from Dušan Matić's poem Number 4-21-35 (Broj 4-21-35), which the student youth wore on their lapels. Kun himself decided to go to Spain. As the authorities of the Kingdom of Yugoslavia prevented Yugoslav volunteers from leaving, Kun was first refused a passport by the police, but managed to request a joint passport with his wife Nada, in order to go to Paris where the World's fair was being held at the time. With the help of a lawyer working for the police, he received a passport and traveled with his wife to Paris in July 1937. In Paris, Kun had meetings with Bora Baruh who worked in the Committee helping Yugoslav volunteers reach Spain, as well as volunteers Radivoj Uvalić, Rodoljub Čolaković and others. He stayed in Baruh's studio, where Ljubica Sokić also painted at the time.

After waiting for two months Kun set off for southern France with smaller group, from where they crossed illegally into Spain. Immediately after his arrival, he underwent military training, during which he was chosen as the commander of Yugoslav volunteers. After completing the training, they were assigned to the International Battalion Đuro Đaković and sent to the front in Albacete. During his stay on the front line, in addition to participating in battle, he made drawings with motifs from the war. Later, at the insistence of Božidar Maslarić and Rodoljub Čolaković, he was transferred to the battalion headquarters. Later, as a cultural worker, he was transferred to the Headquarters of the 129th International Brigade. In Spain, he collaborated with Croatian journalist and writer August Cesarec and made seven drawings to illustrate his manuscript, published in Toronto in 1938 under the title Spanish Encounters (Španjolski susreti), a book of encounters with people and cities. In May 1938, by order of the KPJ, he was transferred from the front in Teruel to Barcelona, where he was informed that he had to return to Paris. In Barcelona, he had a meeting with Kosta Nađ. As he had no documents, he had to cross the border illegally.

In Paris, Kun stayed with Baruh again before returning to Yugoslavia in 1938. As he had a passport with which he traveled to the World's fair, he returned to the country legally. All of his drawings were left in Paris and later sent to Yugoslavia by mail. He lived with his family in the house of his father-in-law Mihajlo Ratković at Kotež Neimar where he painted, collecting money for the publication of his graphics from Spain. At the end of 1938, he managed to find a printer who printed the collection titled For Freedom (Za slobodu) in January 1939, which contained 12 graphics depicting the Spanish Civil War. Immediately after the set was first printed, Kun was arrested together with the printer. He spent a month in the Glavnjača prison, run by the Belgrade City Administration. As the police were unable to find proof of his stay in Spain, he was released. During the arrest, the police confiscated and destroyed almost all copies of For Freedom. A preserved copy was used to print new editions in March 1946 for the Congress of Spanish Fighters of Yugoslavia. In addition to this collection, Kun also made two paintings depicting the war — Execution (Streljanje) from 1939 shows a group of captured patriots standing in front of fascist soldiers on the execution ground, while No pasaran, which was completed in 1948, shows a woman standing with a rifle, with an inscription behind her reading "No pasaran" (It will not pass).

For Freedom (Za slobodu), graphics from the Spanish Civil War (1938)

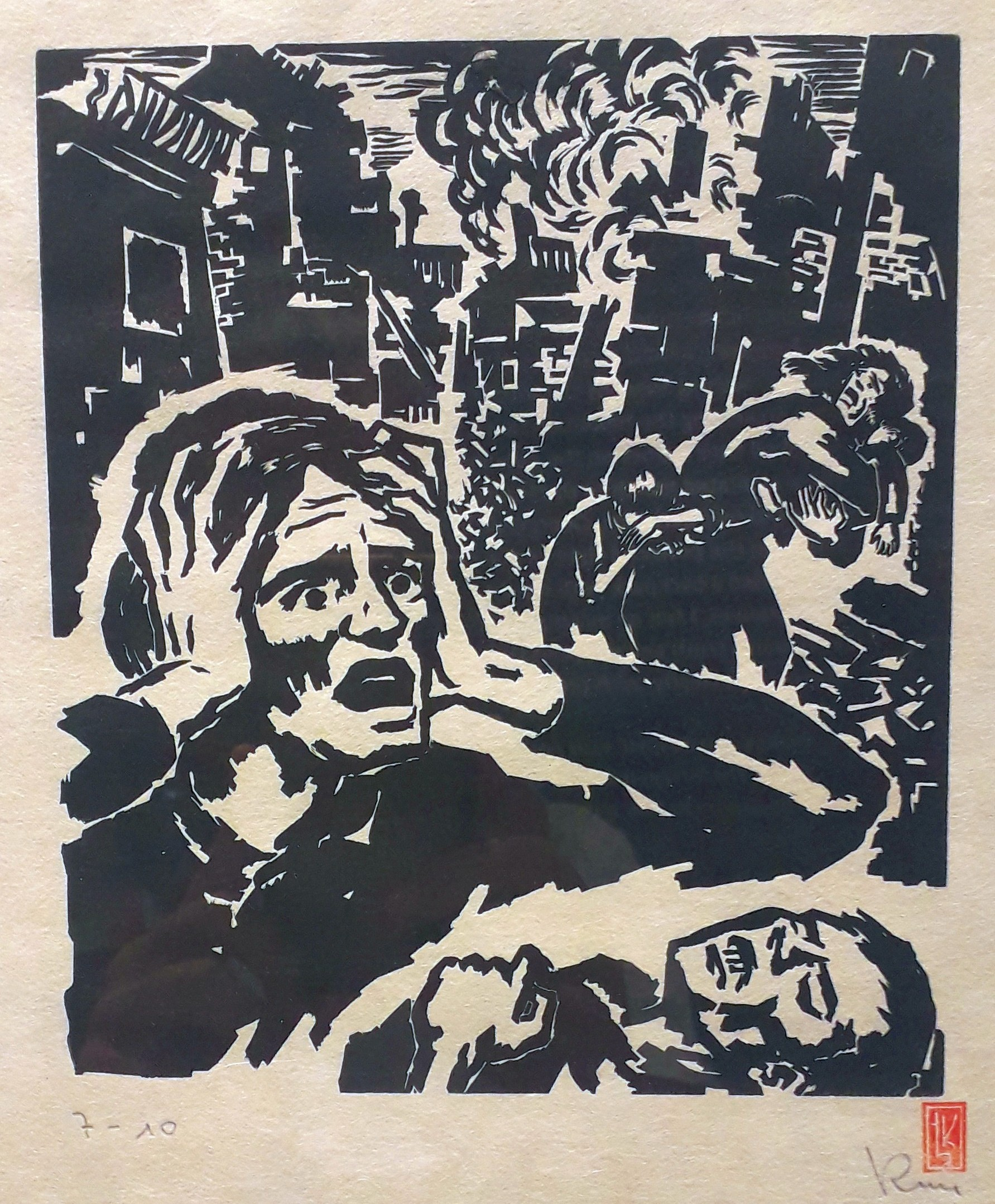

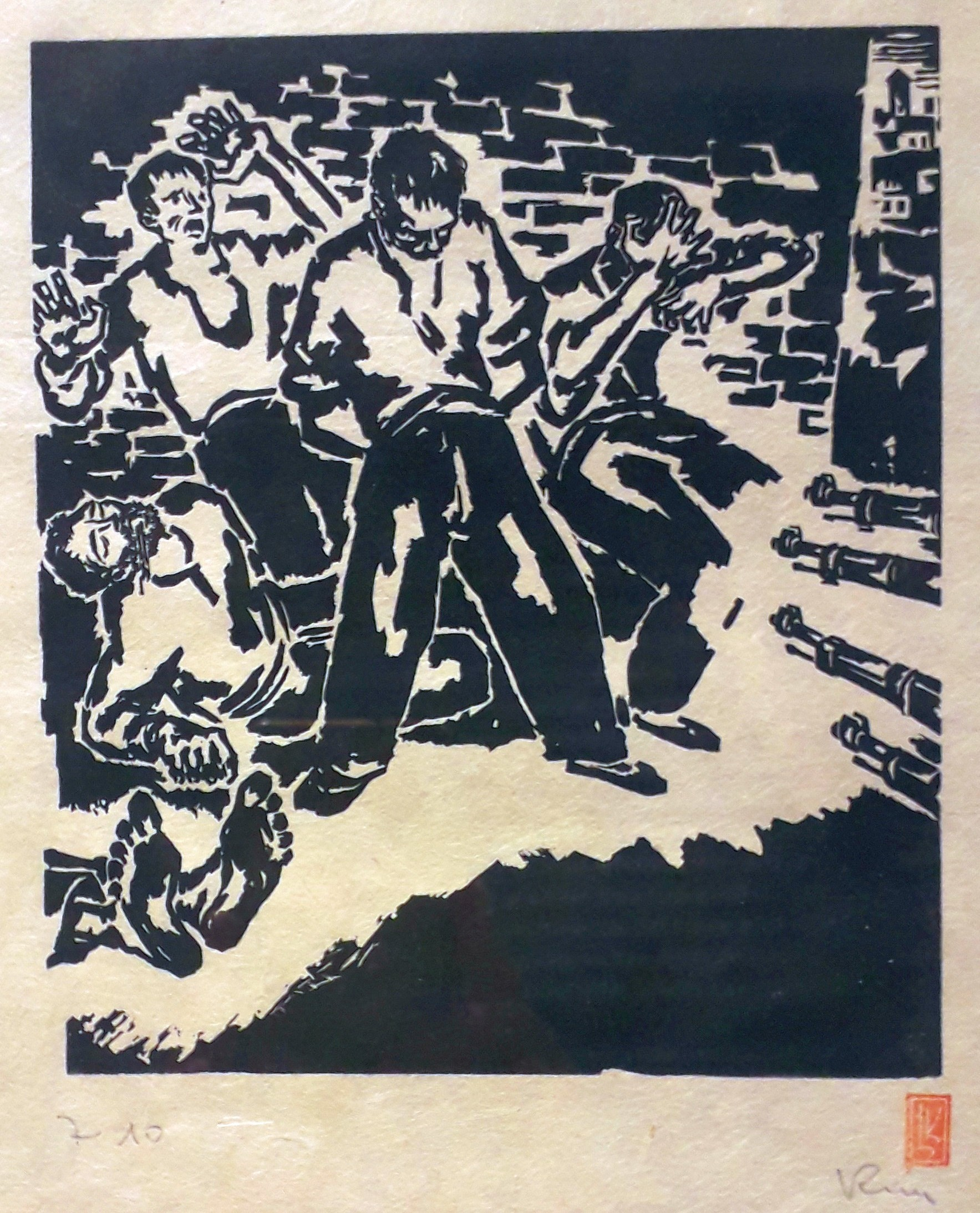

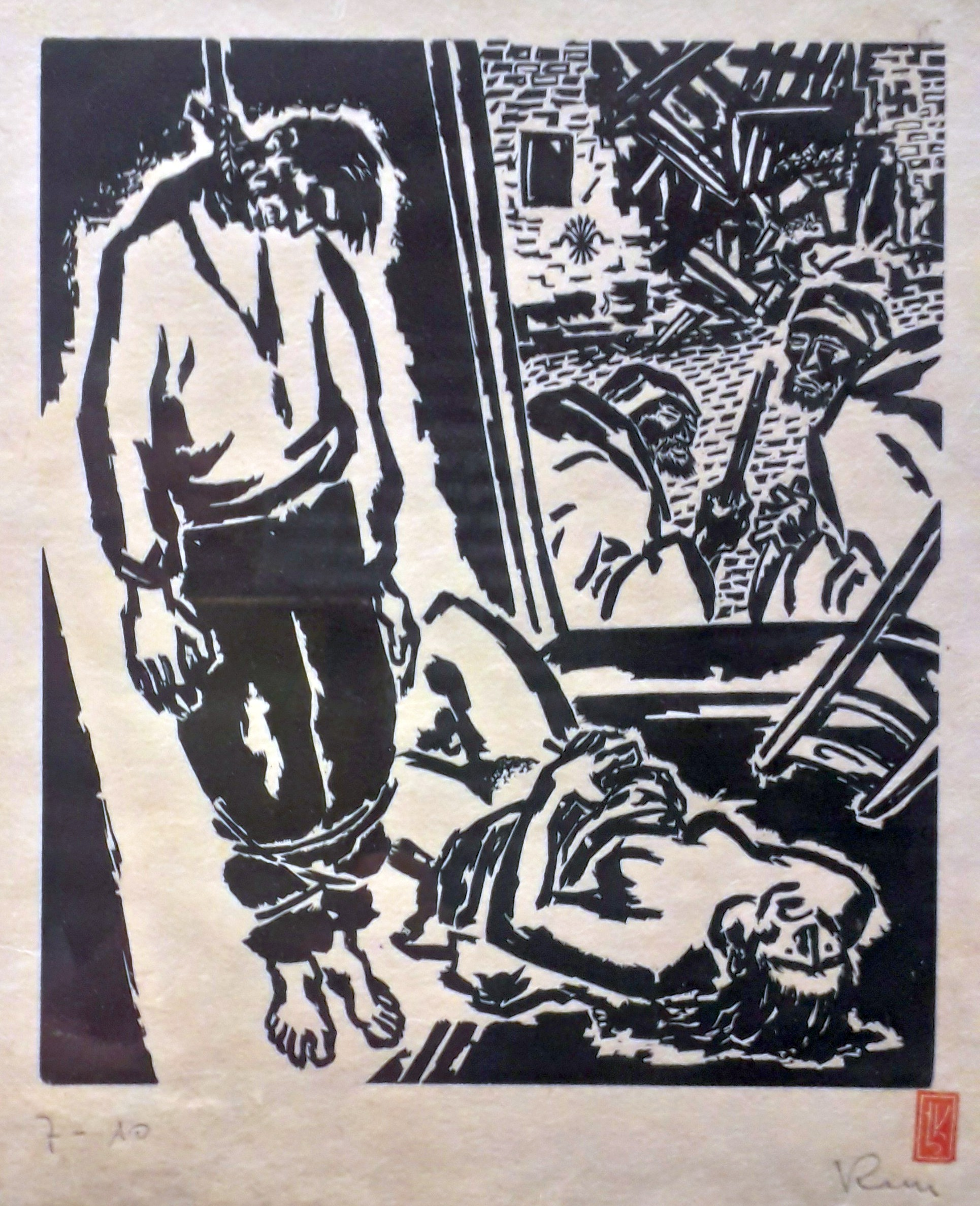

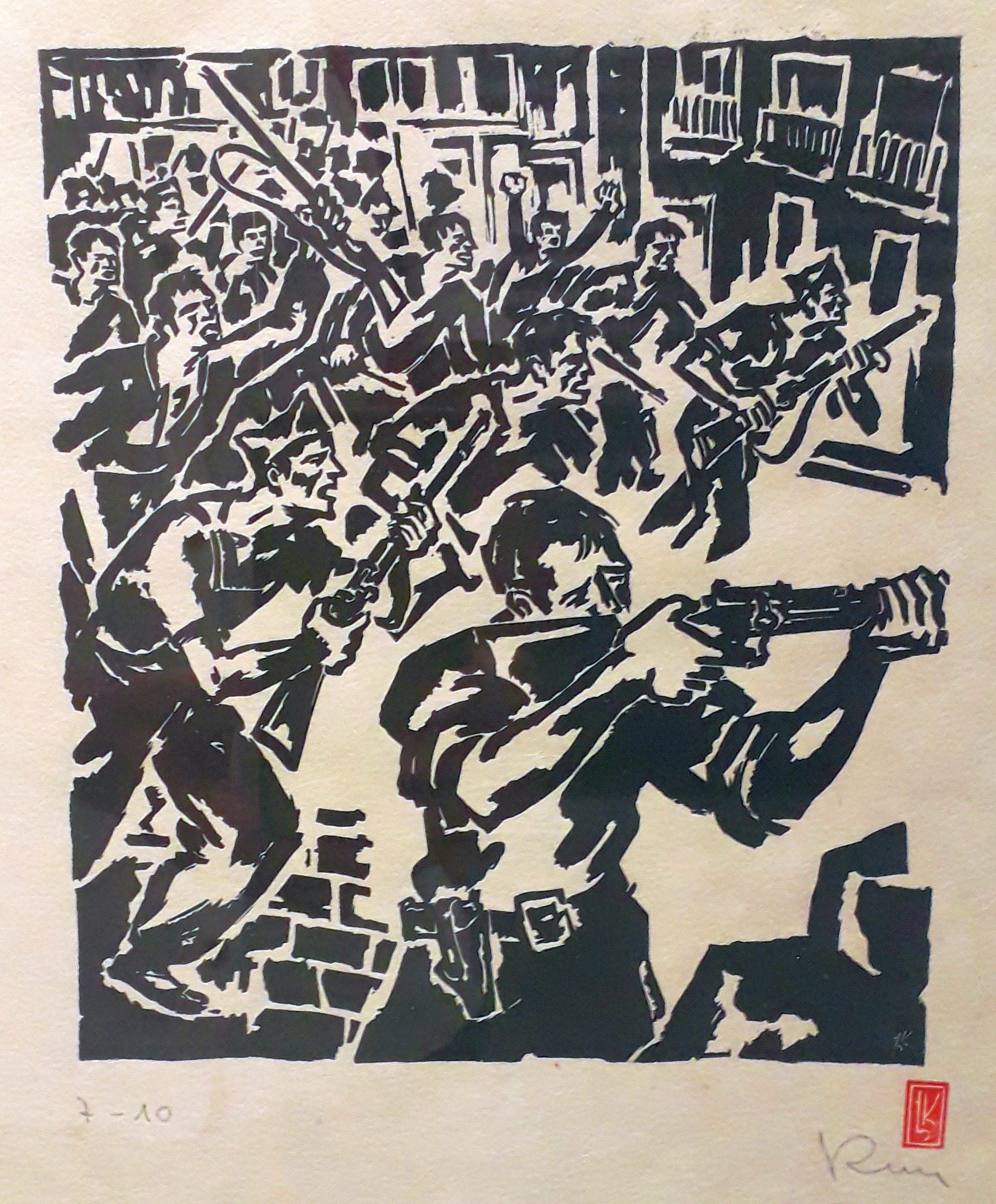

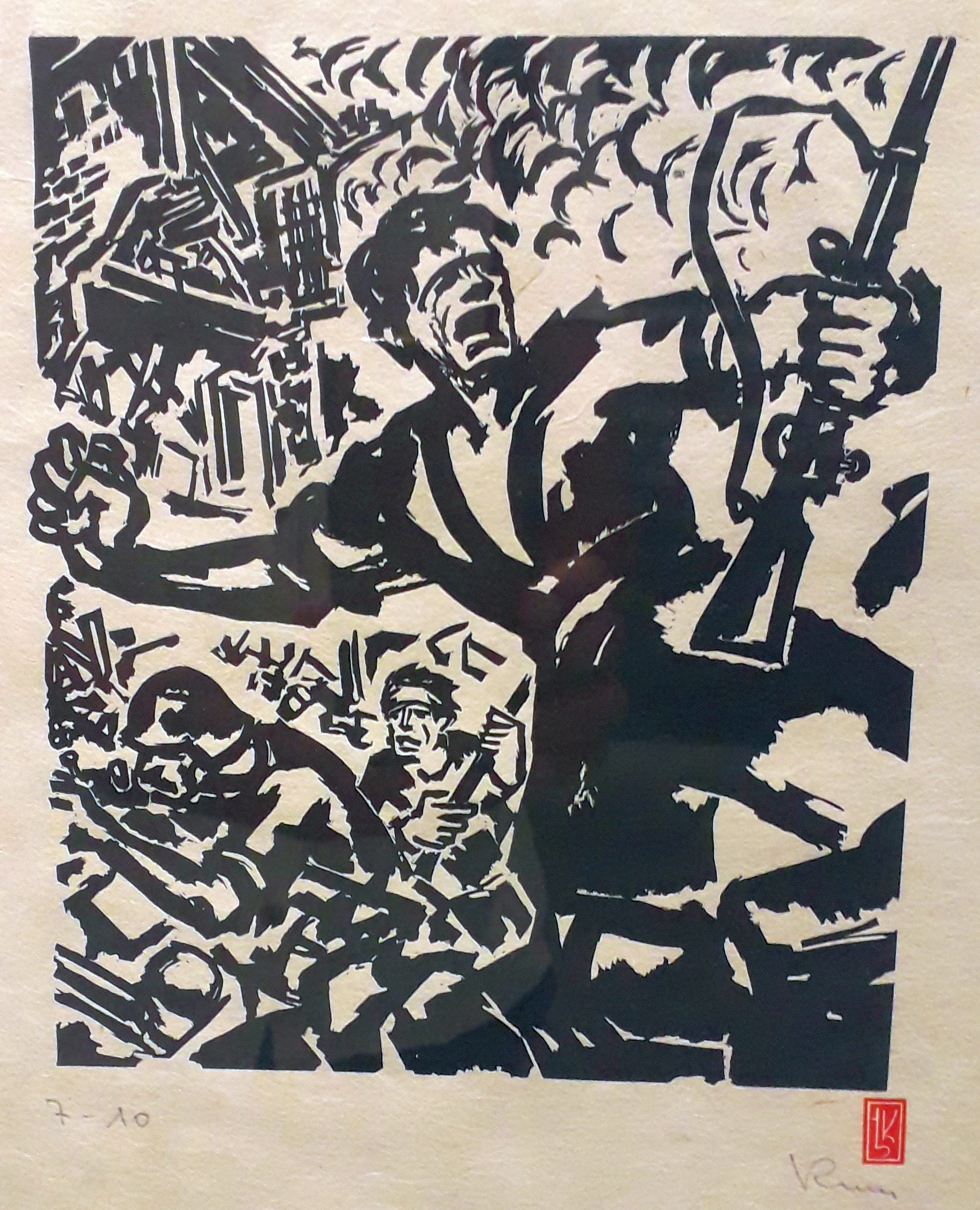

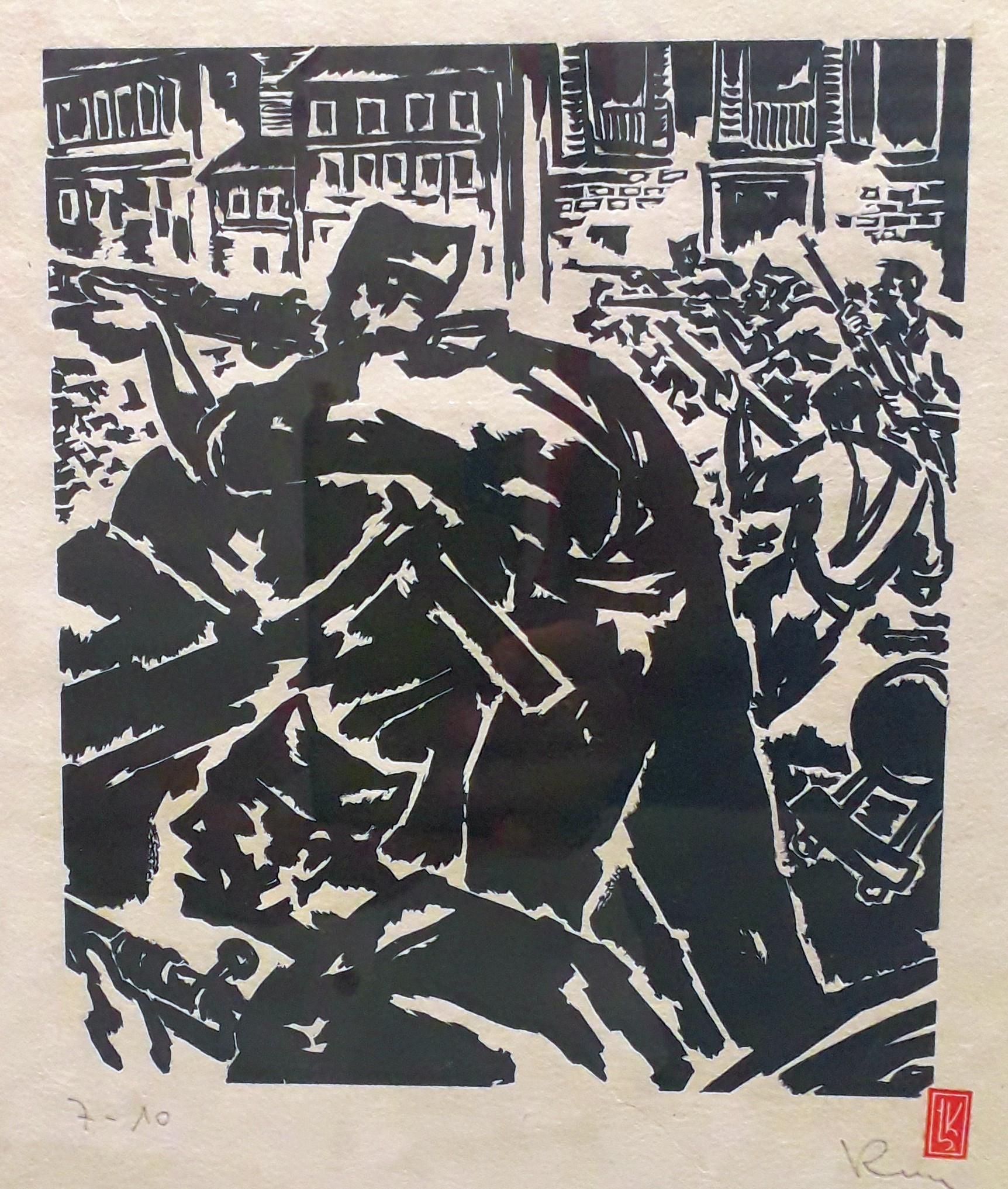

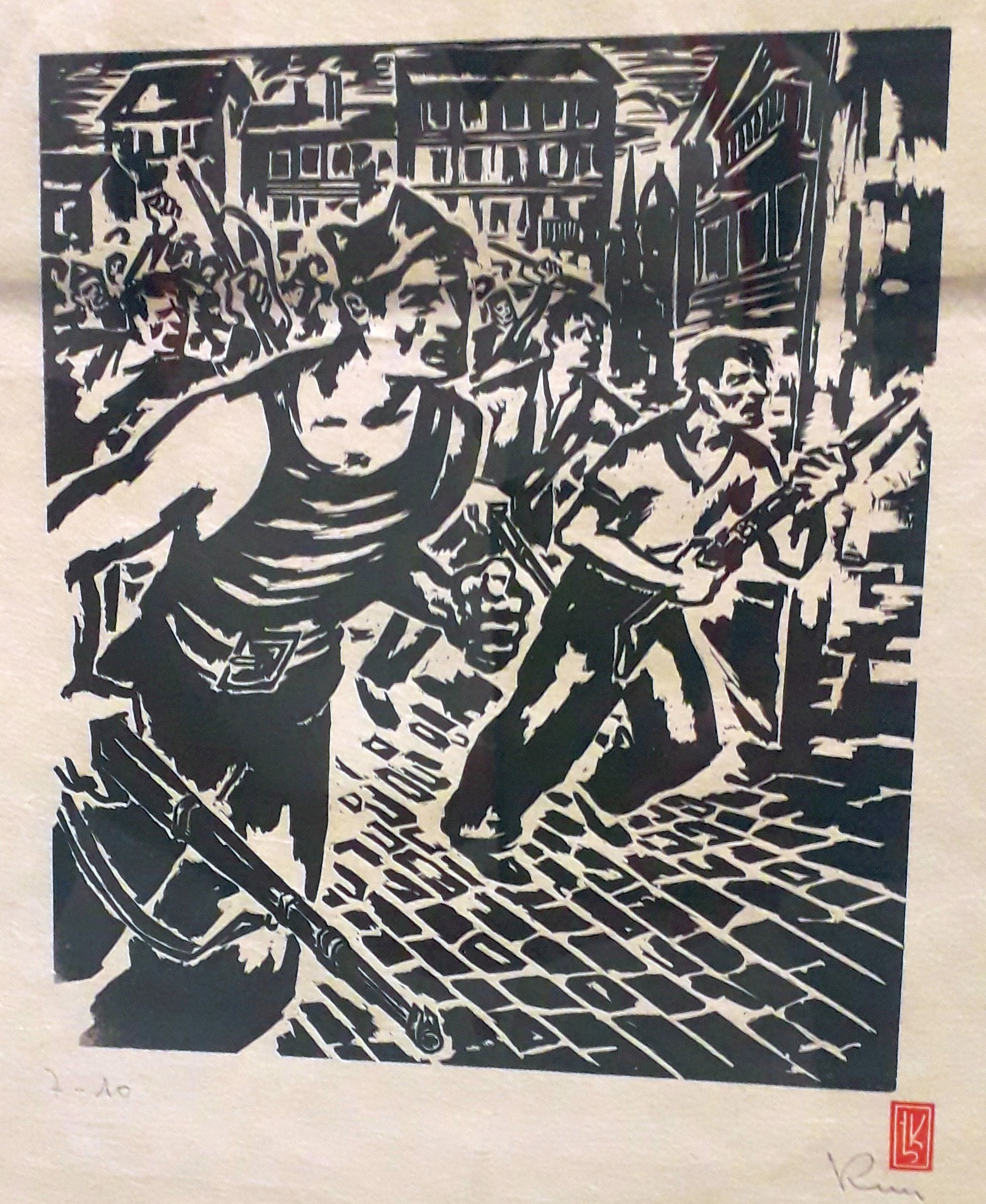

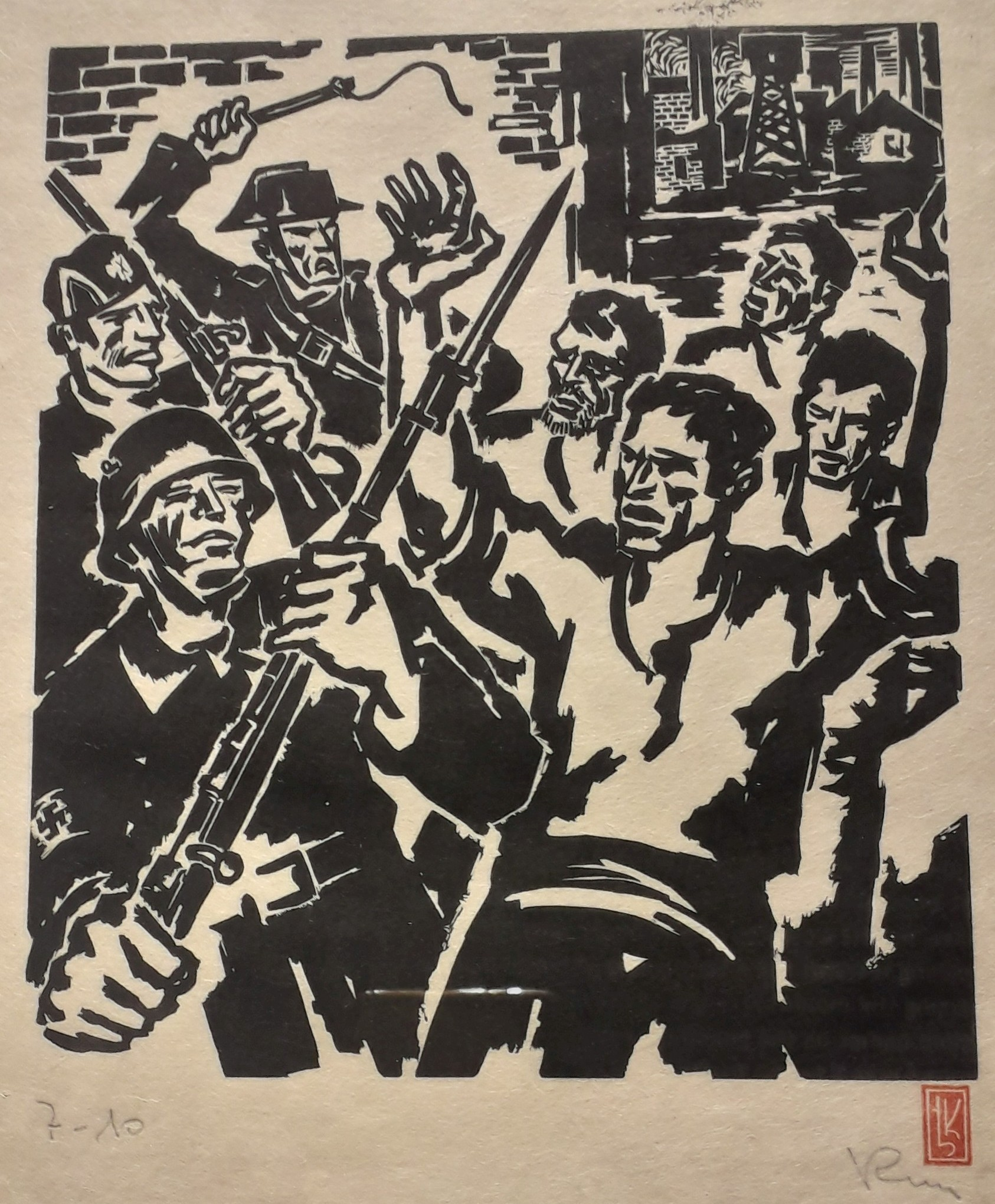

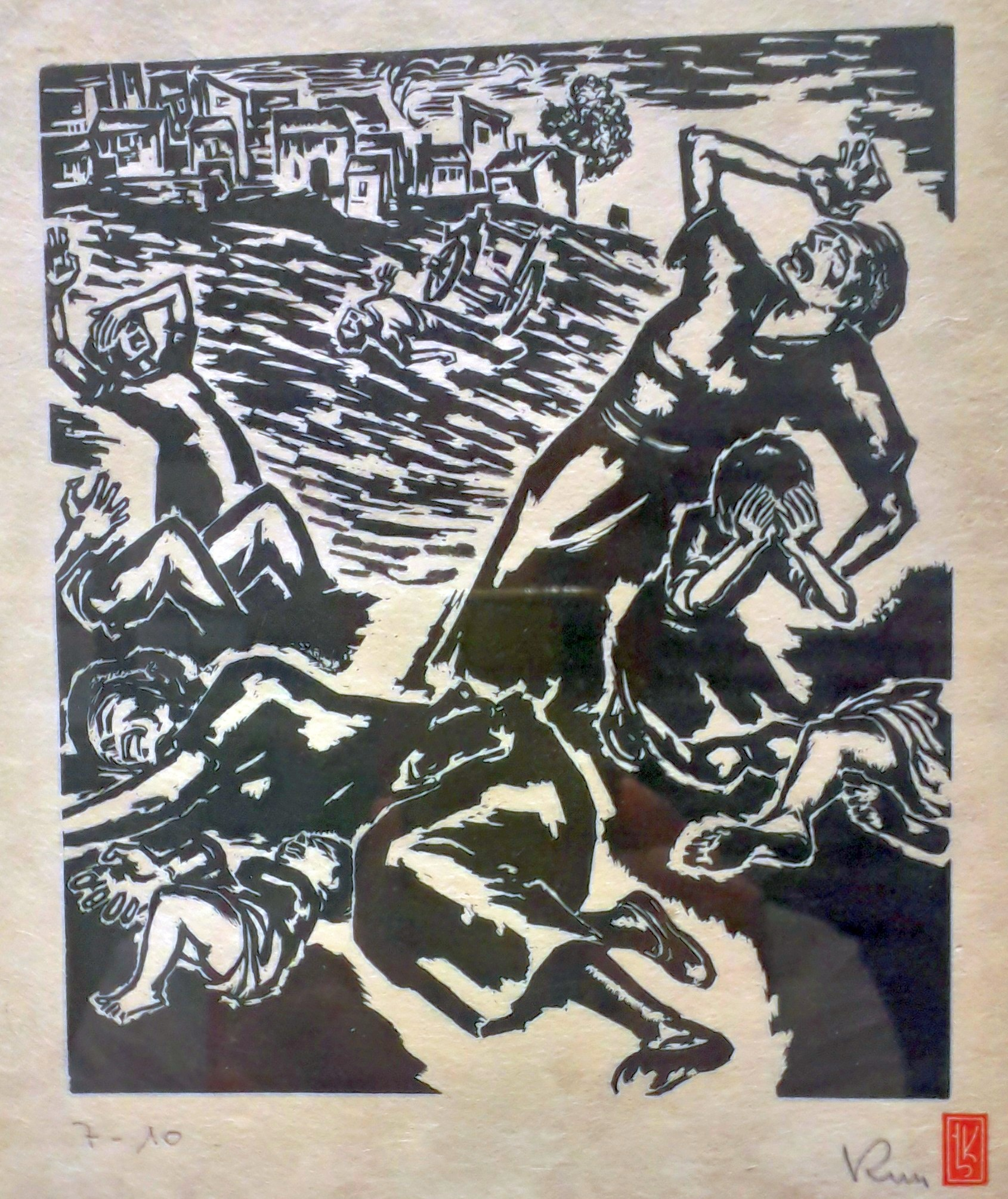

=== Revolutionary activities ===
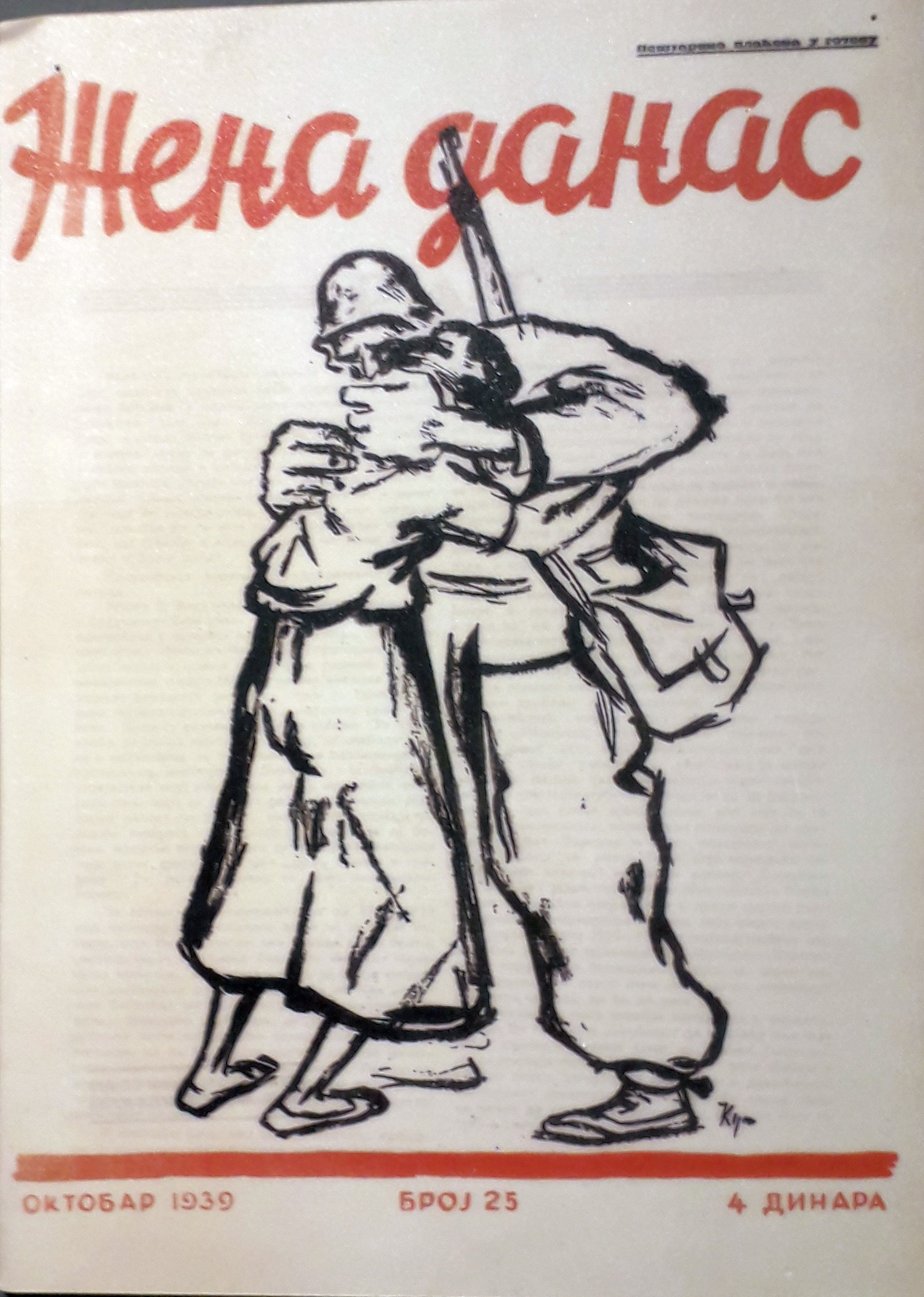
Kun's artwork for the feminist magazine Žena danas, 1939

Kun's political activity was well known to the police, who registered him as a communist. After the start of the Second World War in September 1939 and during increased political unrest in the country, which culminated in large demonstrations in Belgrade on 14 December 1939, the Cvetković-Maček government established concentration camps for political opponents. On the basis of the Decree, by which the Viceroyalty authorized the government to change existing laws and regulations instead of the dissolved National Assembly, as well as pass new ones. Police forces were given the authority to forcibly move persons that "disturb national peace" or change their place of residence under the supervision of the authorities. Shortly after the adoption of the law, between December 1939 and January 1940, a group of 25 prominent communists were arrested in Belgrade. Among those arrested were Moša Pijade, Ivan Milutinović, Ivo Lola Ribar, Bora Baruh, Blagoje Nešković and Kun. After spending some time in the prison of the Belgrade City Administration, those arrested were taken to the concentration camp in Bileća on 18 January 1940. Upon arrival at the camp, the prisoners, who were mostly members of the Communist Party of Yugoslavia, formed a party committee headed by Pijade, Milutinović and Todor Vujasinović. During his stay in the camp, Kun was told by Pijade that he had been accepted as a member of the KPJ. Although Kun was admitted to the KPJ in 1940, his activities started in 1939, according to Pijade. Baruh, Pijade and Kun made various pencil drawings depicting prison life while in the camp.

After the formation of the camp in Bileća, the Communist Party of Yugoslavia led a fierce public campaign for its abolition. Under pressure from the public and several prominent figures, the authorities of the Kingdom of Yugoslavia gradually released prisoners from the camp, which was officially abolished on 25 November 1940. After returning to Belgrade, Kun and his family settled again with his father-in-law Mihajlo Ratković, where he built his studio in the basement of the house. Moša Pijade visited the home frequently, and for a time they painted together in Kun's studio and exhibited together at the Thirteenth Autumn Exhibition at the Art Pavilion in Kalemegdan. The same year Kun used his prison sketches for his painting Waiting (Čekanje). In the fall of 1940, Svetozar Vukmanović, who was in charge of the technical department of the KPJ Central Committee, agreed with party activists Branko and Danica Maksimović to build a special shelter within a house on Banjički venac where an illegal printing press would be stored and used to print leaflets and other party propaganda material. Construction of the house began in early 1941, but the bombing of Belgrade and the beginning of the occupation of Yugoslavia in April 1941 briefly interrupted the work. In the fallowing months, the Belgrade City Administration police gathered all prominent Belgrade communists under the pretext of "military exercises" and send them to Smederevska Palanka to a military camp. The KPJ managed to expose the plan and communists on the list, including Kun, went into hiding.

=== World War II in Yugoslavia ===
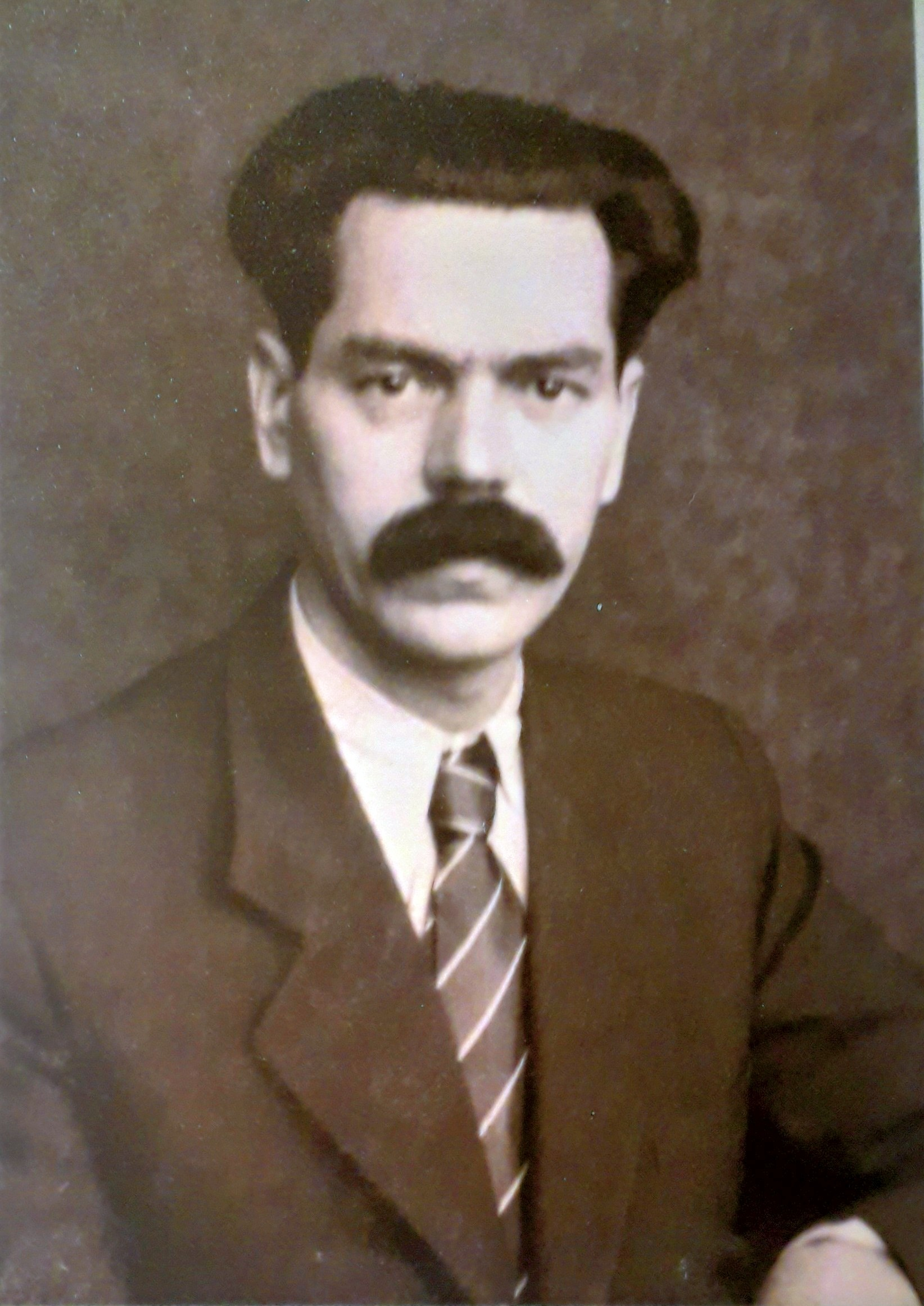
Photograph from Kun's wartime documents, 1940–1943

After the attack of the Axis Powers on the Kingdom of Yugoslavia and the bombing of Belgrade on April 6, 1941, Kun went to Bačka Palanka to report to the military command. While in Ruma, he received news that his unit had been transferred to Bosnia, and he subsequently headed to Han Pijesak via Šabac and Zvornik, where he received news of the capitulation of the Yugoslav Army. He headed back to Belgrade, and after two weeks of searching for the unit, he returned home at the end of April. His father-in-law's house, where he lived with his family, was damaged in the German bombing and a large number of his paintings were destroyed. Spasenija Cana Babović announced the party's decision to go underground. In order to better mislead the police, Kun grew a mustache, changed his hairstyle and walk, started wearing glasses and started using the pseudonym Petar Antonijević. Prior to the war, Kun learned how to create forged documents for the party, including passports, identification cards and stamps. With the help of his friend from Spain Milan Blagojević, who illegally lived in his house throughout 1939, he built his graphic press in the bunker's wall in May 1941.

The German police discovered one of Kun's forged documents, which contained a two-part stamp. Sympathizers of the Partisan movement working for the Belgrade police, managed to hand over a copy of the German report to the KPJ leadership. During the summer of 1941, Kun had a meeting in Belgrade with KPJ General Secretary Josip Broz Tito, whom he supplied with forged documents, but whose identity he did not know at the time. At the end of May, the construction of the house continued. In order to disguise the entrance to this room, Milhajlo Ratković made a closet in his workshop from which the hidden area could be entered. The illegal printing house of the KPJ Central Committee in Belgrade began operating in August 1941. Many publications printed in it were decorated with Kun's woodcuts. He also made letterheads for the newspapers Glas, Proleter and the Bulletin of the Supreme Headquarters.

Since the beginning of the occupation, Kun lived in his cousin's apartment in Hadži Milentijeva Street, but due to the accidents that happened in the immediate vicinity in early August 1941, he had to change his place of residence. After leaving Nejmar, he moved to Topčidersko brdo, where he lived until 1942, when he came to a house on Banjički Venac, which housed an illegal printing press. After that, he lived for a certain time in the immediate vicinity in a house in Činovnička Kolonija, in the basement of which, immediately after his arrival, he made a secret shelter. The legal tenants in the house were the mother and sister of the Spanish volunteer VIajko Begović, while the illegal tenants, besides Kun, were Svetozar Vukmanović and Ivan Ribar. Later, he returned to the house on Banjički venac, where he stayed until leaving Belgrade.

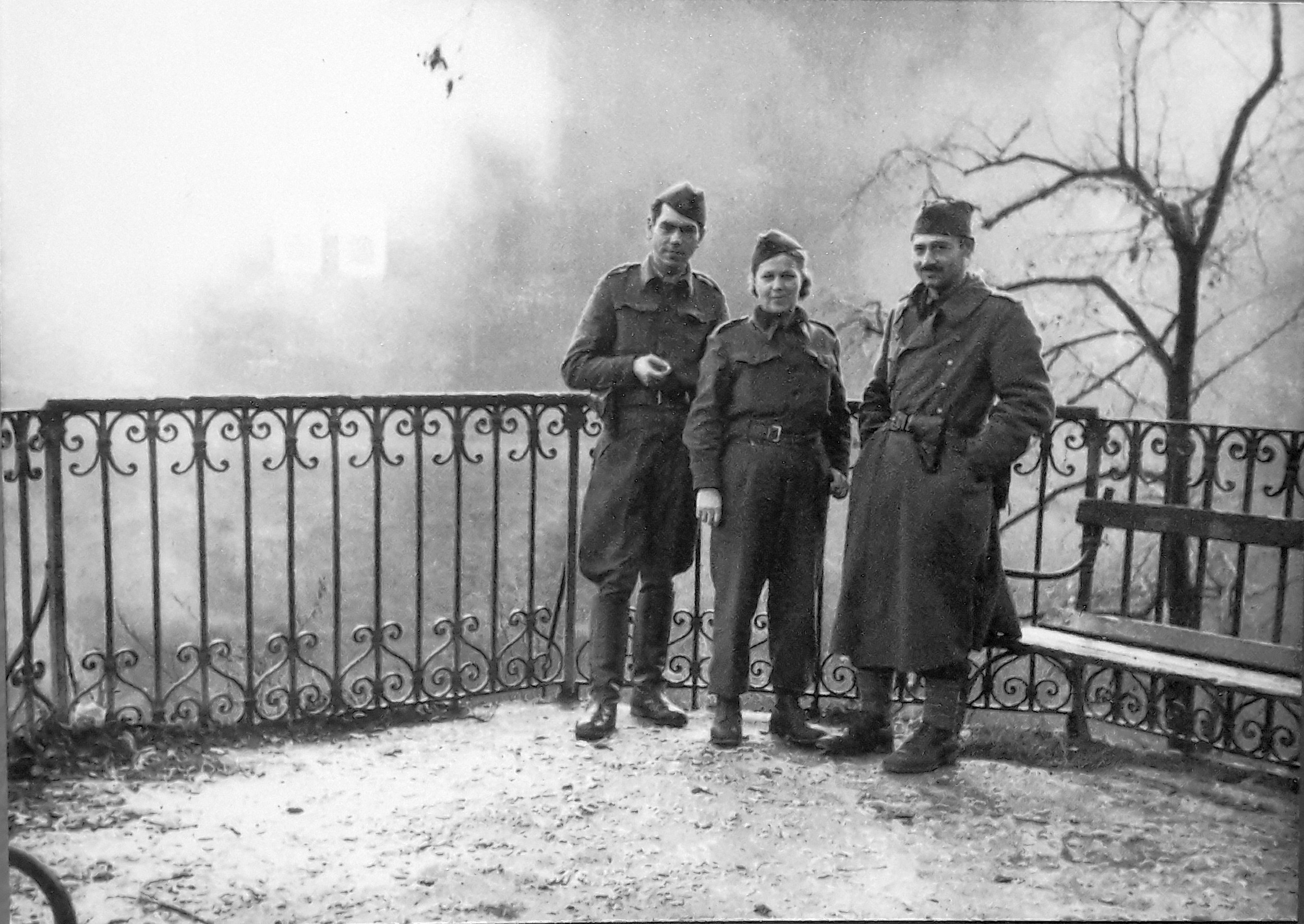
Kun (left) with his wife Nada Andrejević Kun and Bora Nešković in Jajce, 1943

Kun's original plan to leave Belgrade and move to the liberated territory of the Republic of Užice was hindered by the start of Operation Užice in the fall of 1941. As the continued survival of prominent illegals in occupied Belgrade became increasingly difficult, it was decided that in mid-1943 that they would move to the freed territory. This group consisted of Vladislav and Jara Ribnikar, Ljubica Đonović, Brana Perović, Lepa Žujović, Slavka Morić, Milada Rajter, Đorđe Bošković, Lepa Nešić, Nada and Đorđe Andrejević Kun and others. In order not to be noticed by the occupiers and the Special Police, members of the group left the city separately starting from May 1943. On 3 June, Nada and Đorde left Belgrade and went to Obrenovac, where they crossed the Sava River to Srem near the village of Skela. Kun was the first to inform Moša Pijade of his family's death in the Holocaust. They headed to the liberated Jajce from Ozren, which was then the center of the free partisan territory. Kun lived in the grounds of a carbide factory, where he housed his studio in the former director's office. According to his designs, the workers made him a special press for printing woodcuts and linocuts.

In the fall of 1943, the Second AVNOJ Meeting was held in Jajce, for which Kun, sculptor Antun Augustinčić and painter Božidar Jakac decorated the hall of the renovated House of Culture, where the meeting was held on 29 and 30 November. Kun, who was a member oft the Propaganda Department of the Supreme staff of NOV and POJ, painted a portrait of Josip Broz Tito, as well as portraits of leaders of the Allied countries — Winston Churchill, Franklin Roosevelt and Joseph Stalin. Two large paintings which depict the partisan struggle were placed at the very entrance to the House of Culture. After the meeting. which he attended as a councilor of the Anti-Fascist Council of the People's Liberation of Yugoslavia, he was entrusted with the task of creating the emblem of New Yugoslavia. At the suggestion of the Supreme Staff, and based on the decisions of the National Committee for the Liberation of Yugoslavia (NKOJ), he started working on the coat of arms and incorporated Moša Pijade's idea to use torches in the design. The final solution of the coat of arms was accepted by the Supreme Staff, and after the war, the final stylization of the coat of arms was carried out by Antun Augustinčić. The design was made official by the Constitution of the FNRJ and adopted on 31 January 1946.

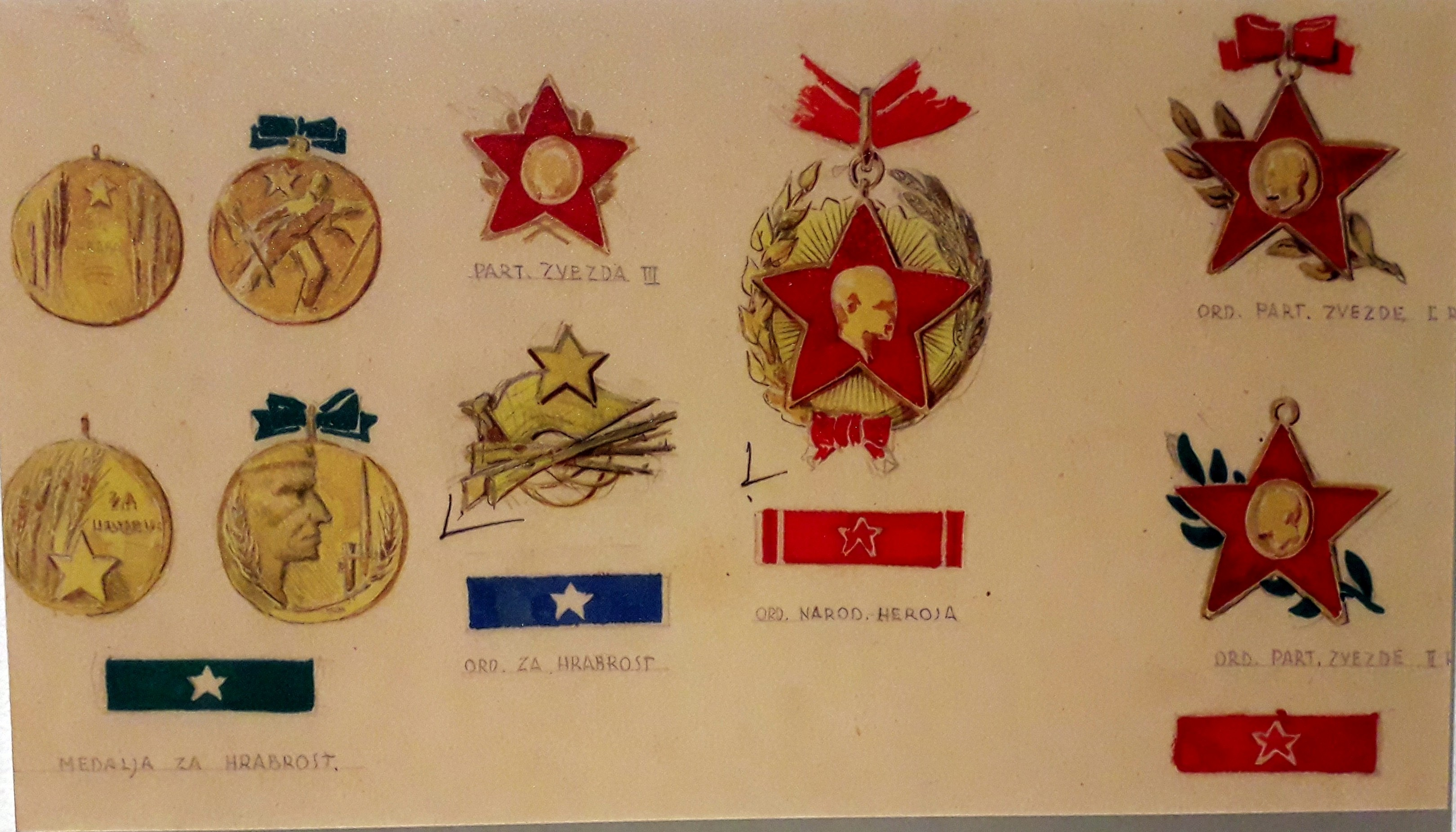
Kun's sketches for partisan medals, 1943

During his stay in Jajce and later in Drvar, in the winter and spring of 1944, Kun worked together with Augustinčić on the creation of conceptual sketches for the first partisan awards established in May 1943. He created conceptual solutions for the Order of the People's Hero, the Order of People's Liberation, the Order of Brotherhood and Unity, the Order of the Partisan Star in three rows, the Order for Courage and the Medal for Courage. Augustinčić went to the Soviet Union with Kun's drawings and in the summer of the same year the first partisan decorations were produced in Moscow. At the suggestion of Ivan Milutinović, commissioner for the National Economy in the NKOJ, in April 1944, he produced the first partisan postage stamp in Drvar. During Operation Rösselsprung on 25 May 1944, Kun's residence was burned down and many of his paintings and graphic works were burned. He managed to preserve a couple paintings, sketches and his drawing pad in his bag. After the liberation he made a set of graphics titled Partisans (Partizani) using sketches made during the war. One of the works from the set is Kurir Jovica, which represents a boy-fighter with an oversized overcoat, boots and a stern facial expression, which over time became a graphic symbol of the youth of Yugoslavia in the War of National Liberation. To create this sketch, Kun was helped by fifteen-year-old Jovan Tolomir, from the village of Podorugla, near Mrkonjić Grad, who was a courier of the Supreme Headquarters.

Partisans (Partizani), graphics depicting the National Liberation of Yugoslavia (1943–1945)

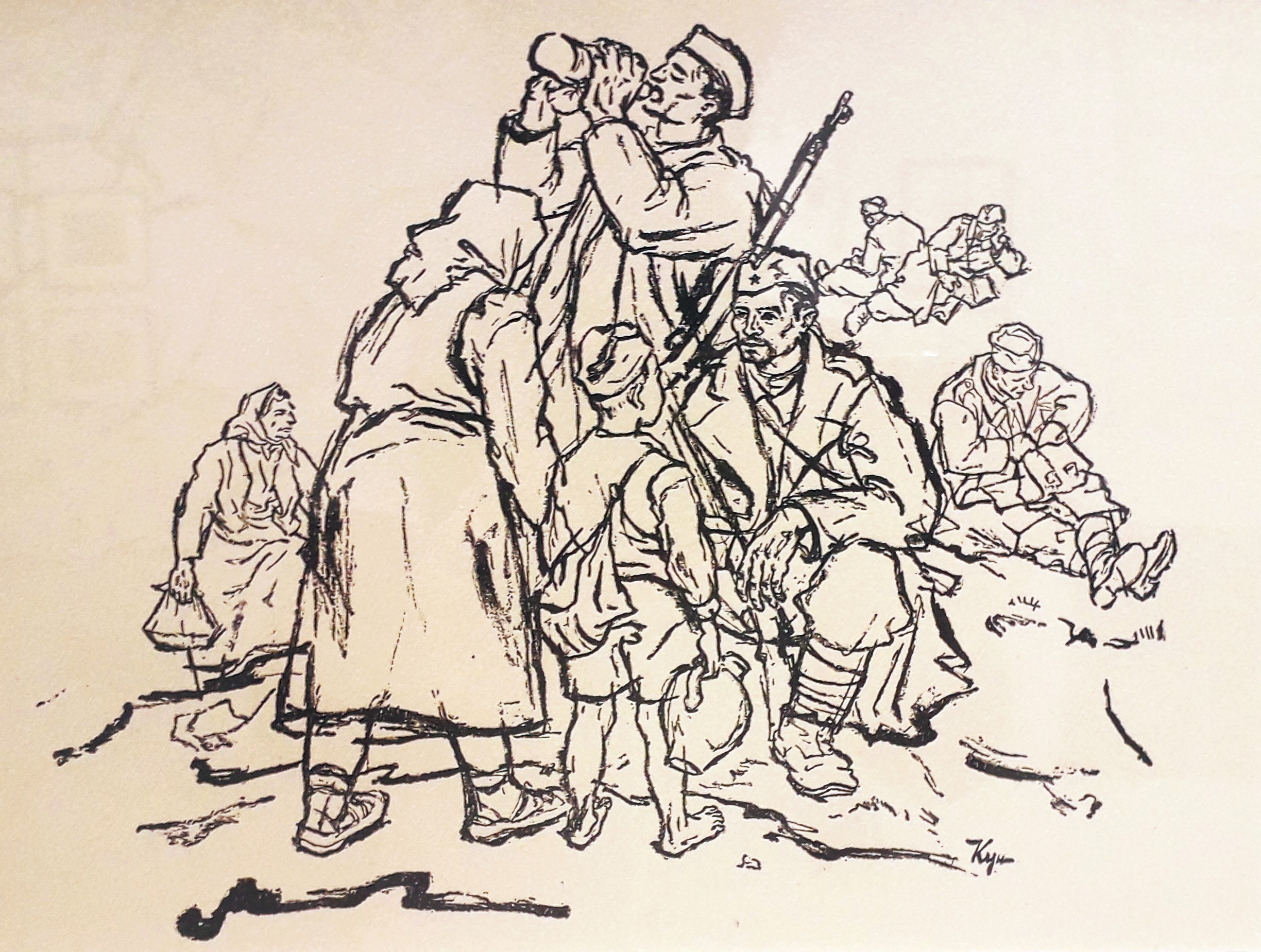

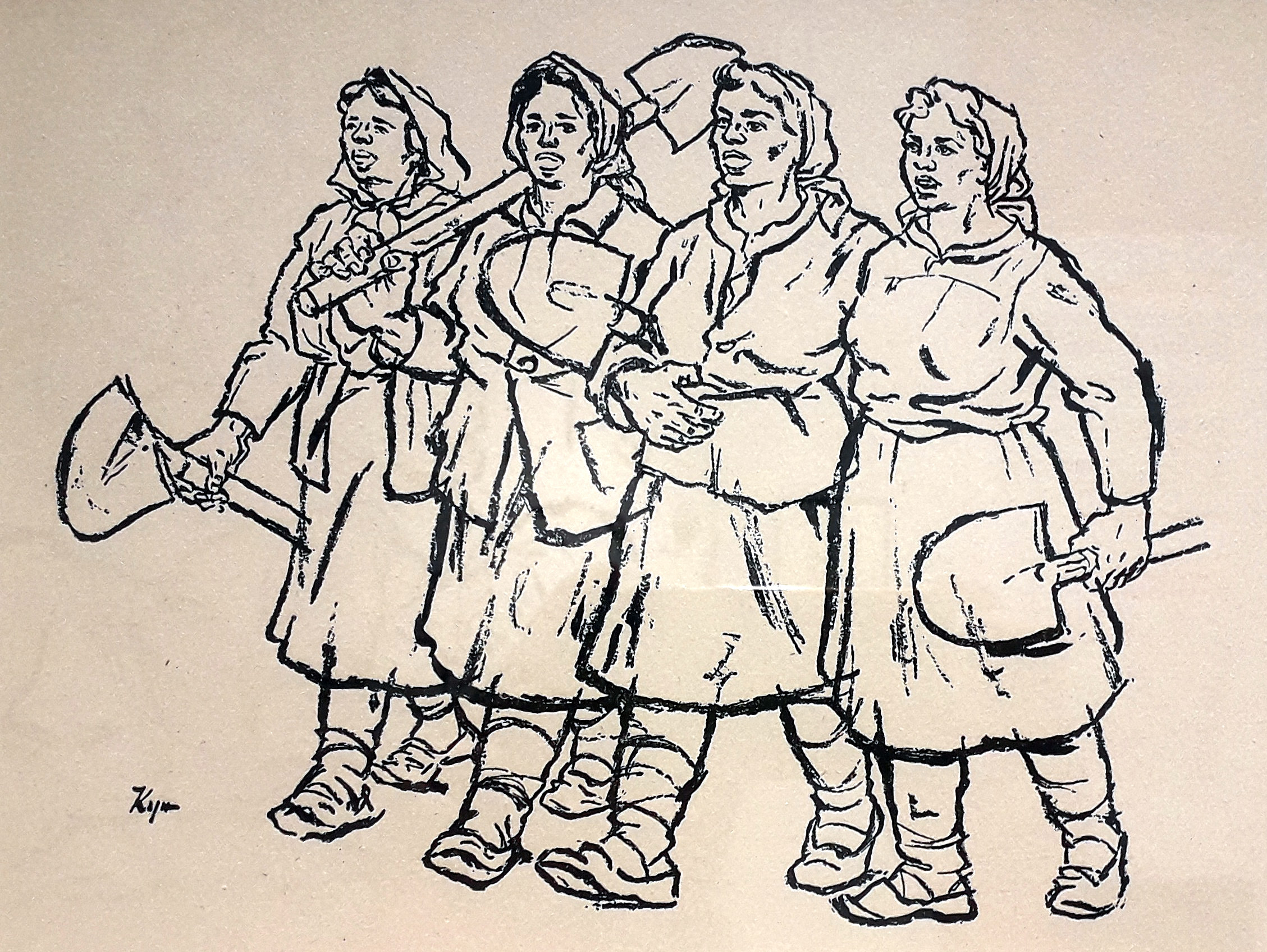

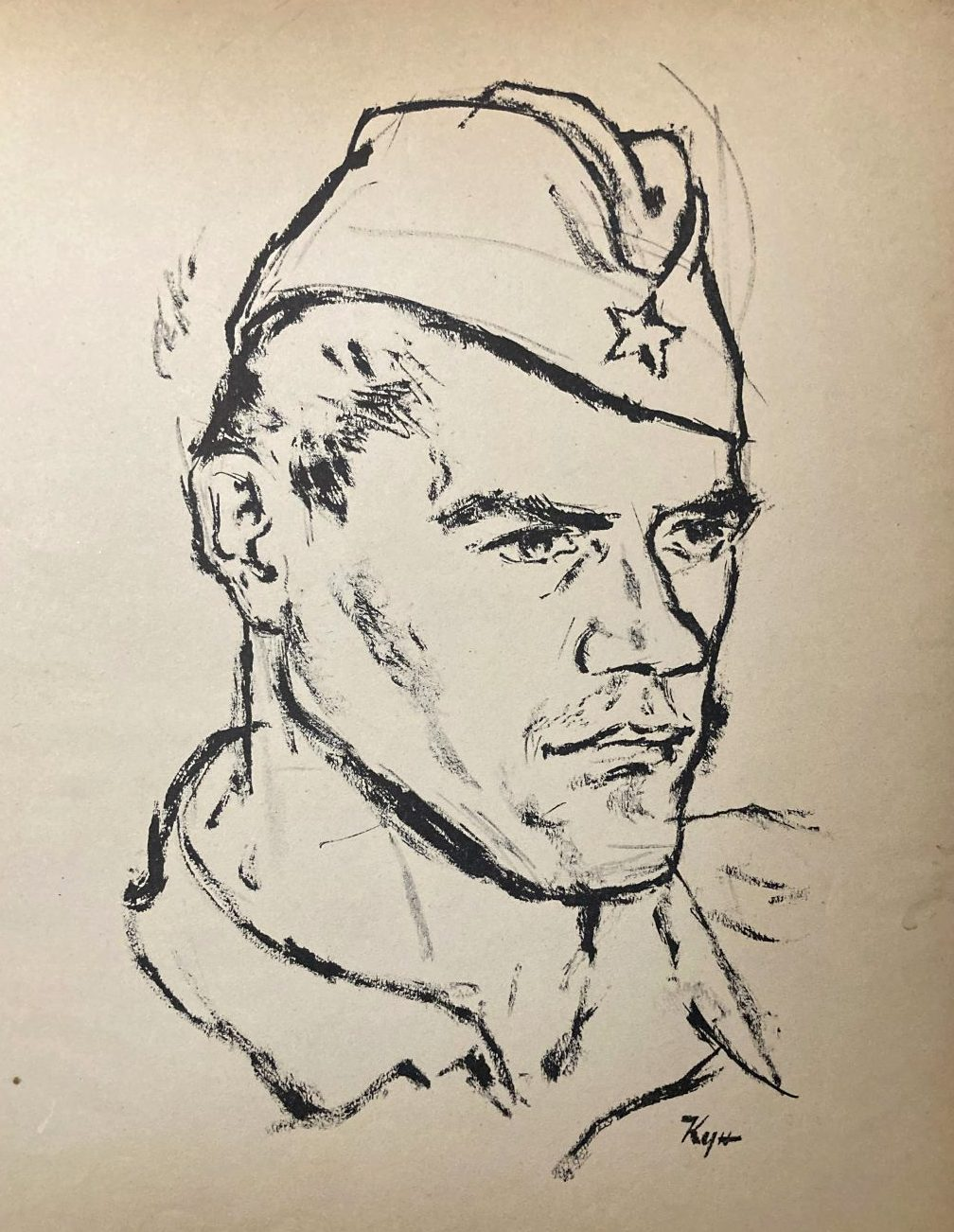

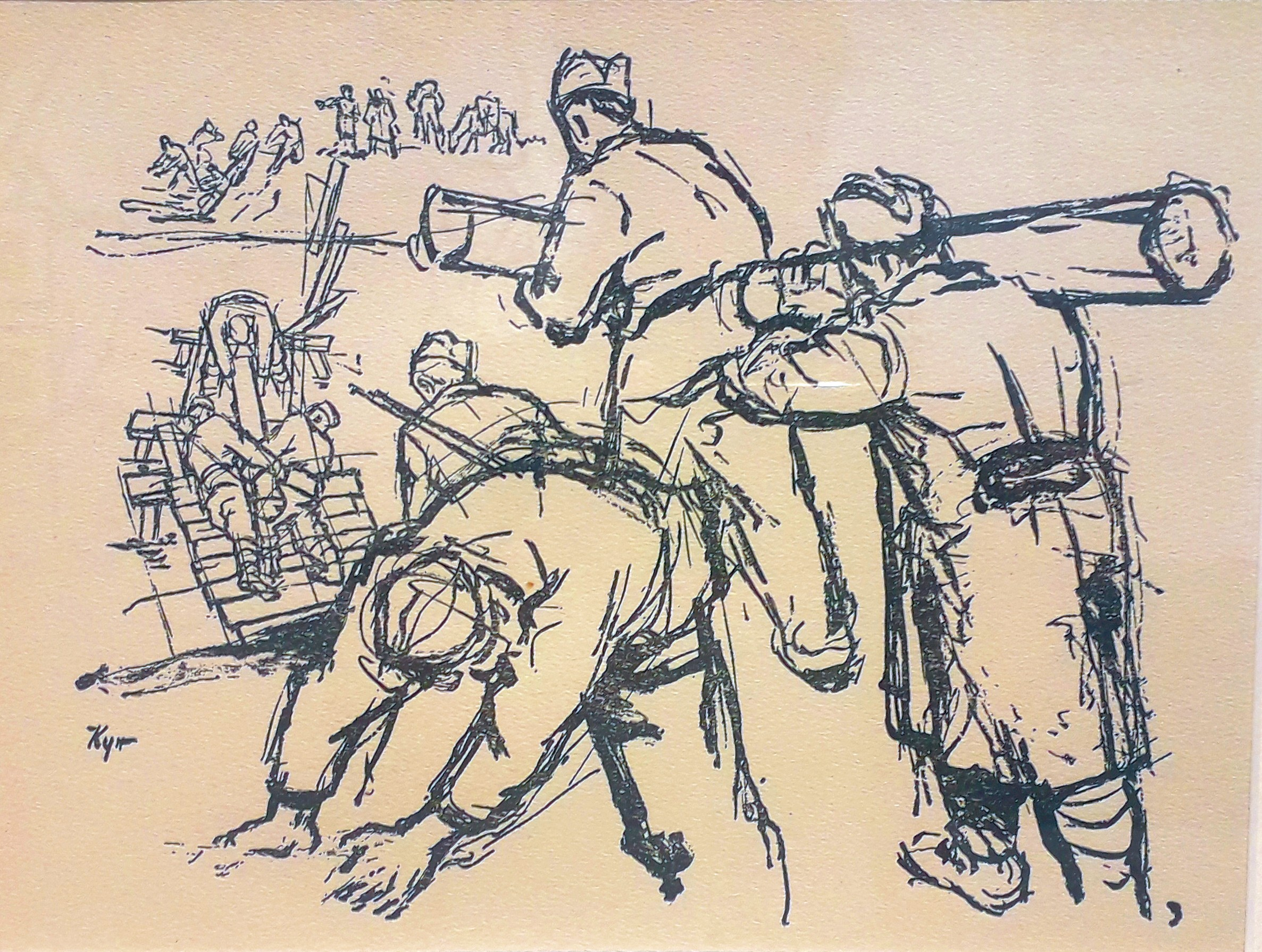

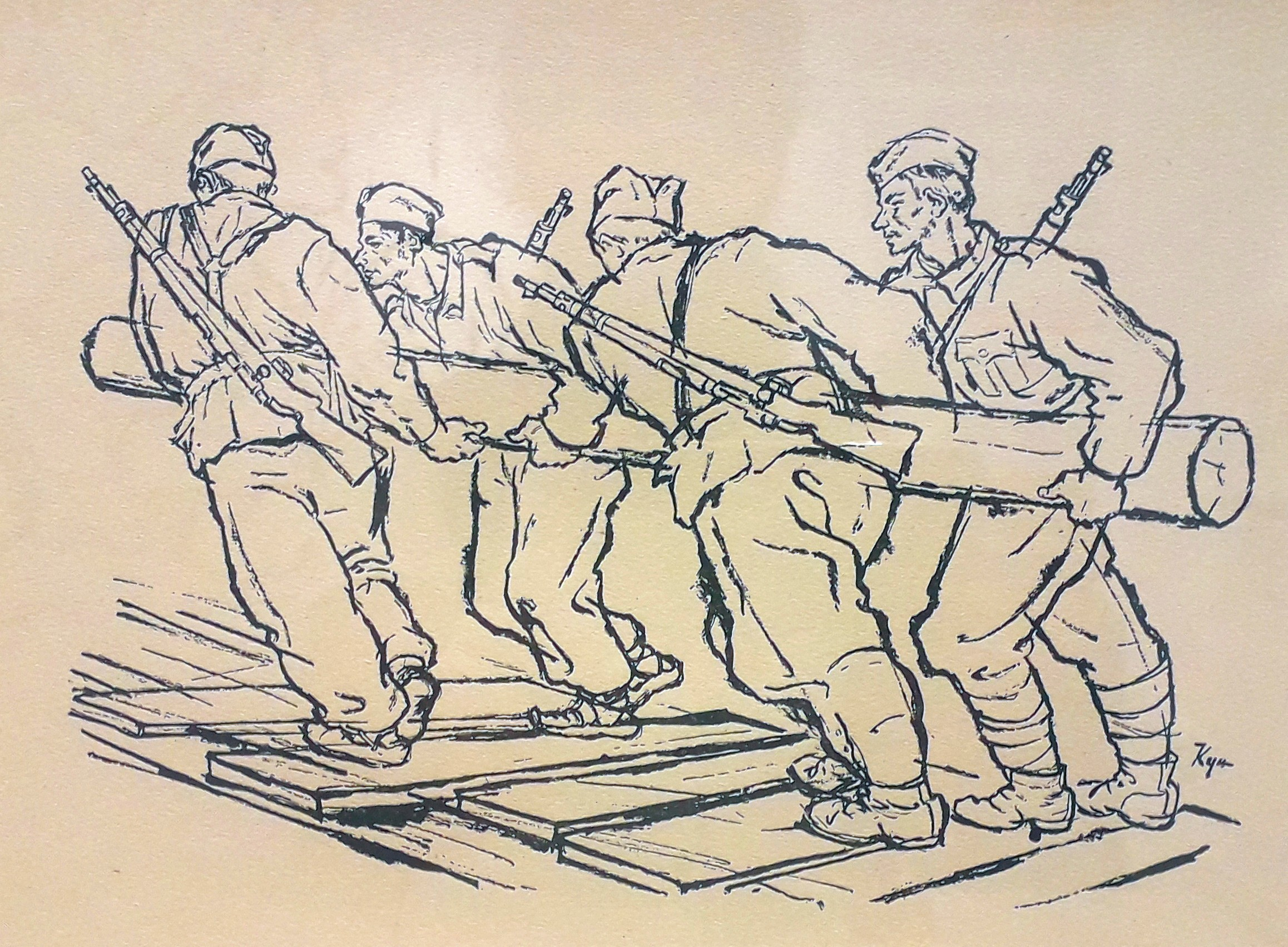

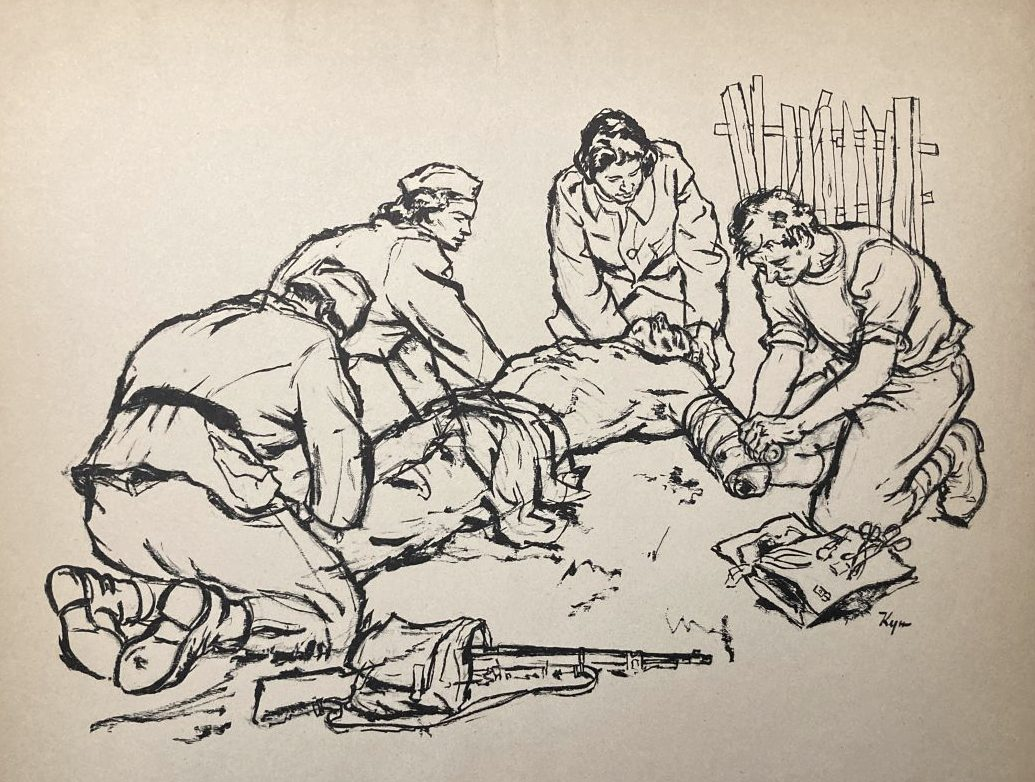

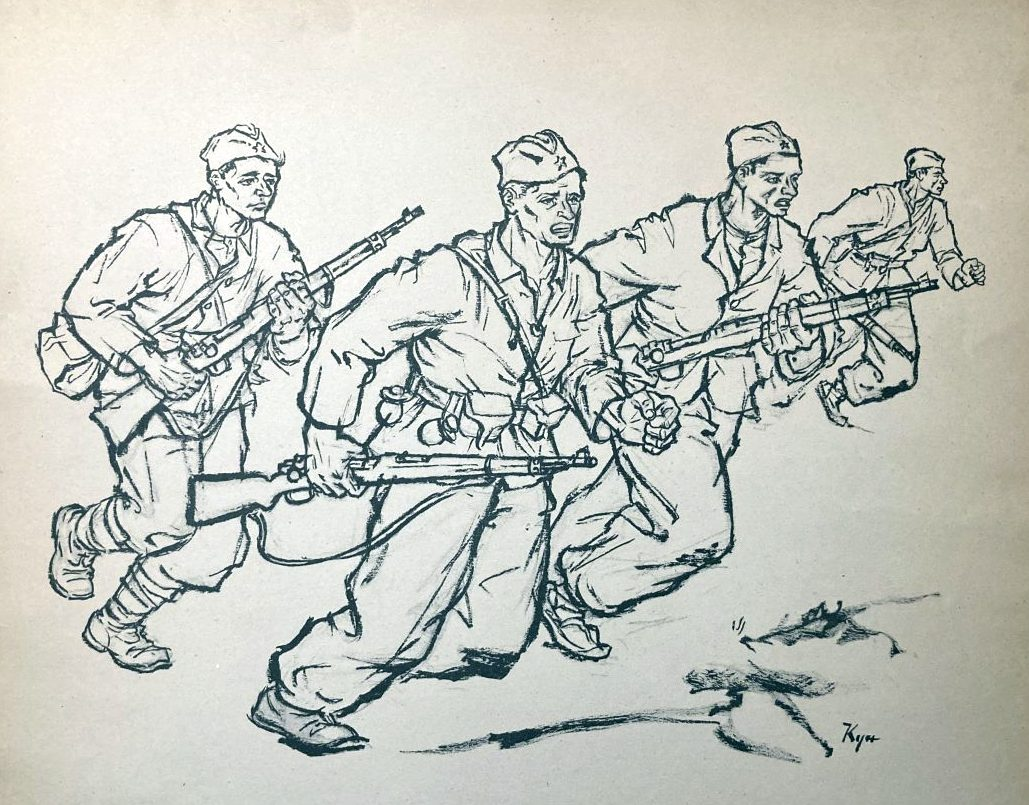

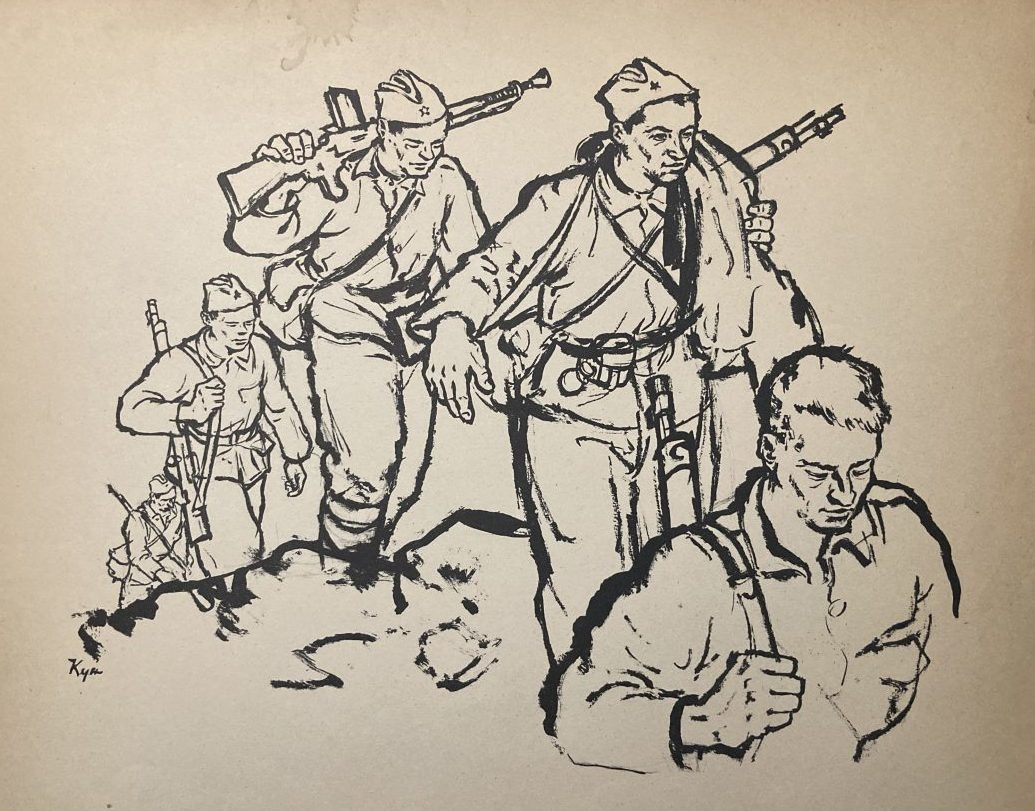

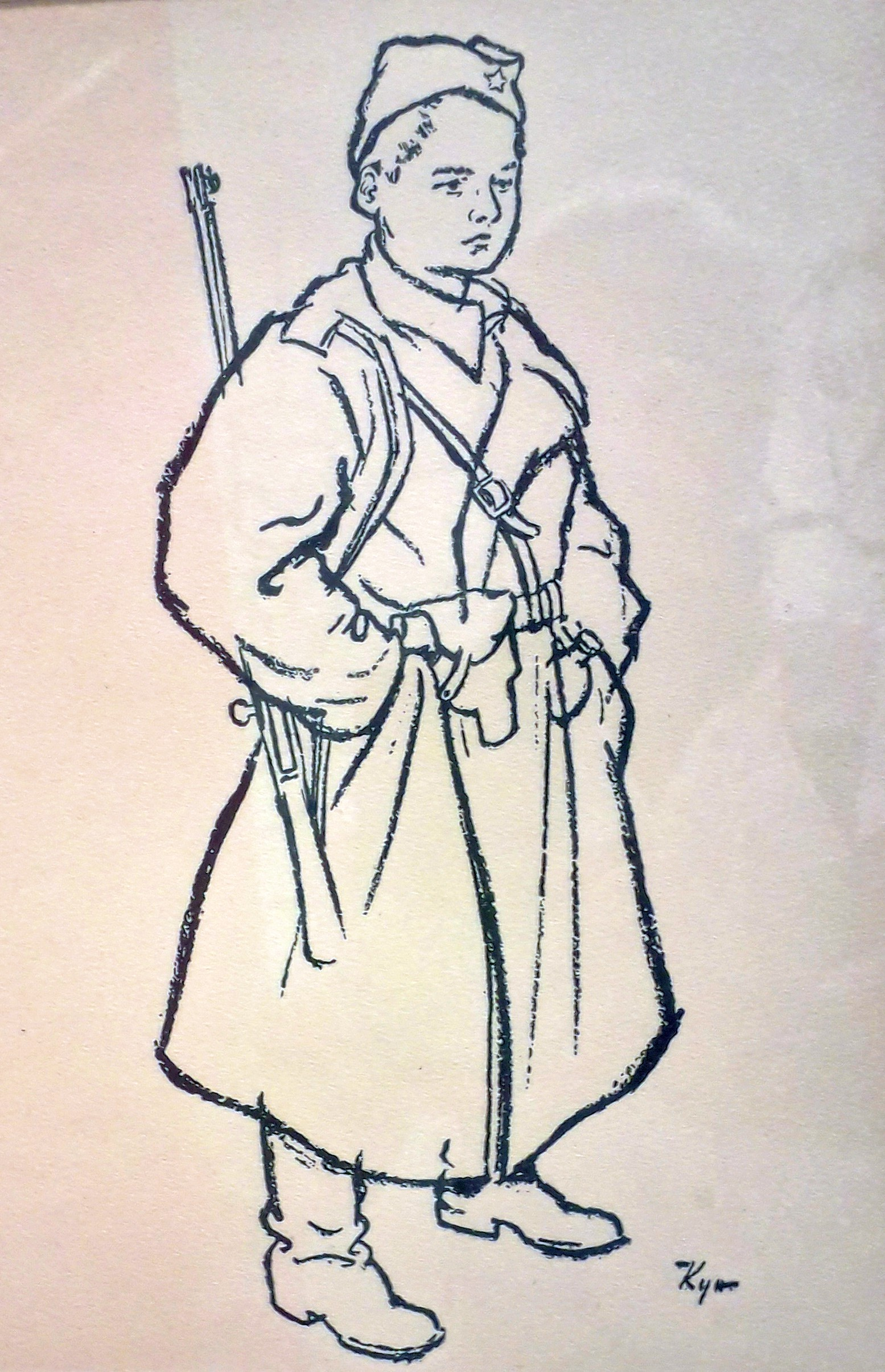

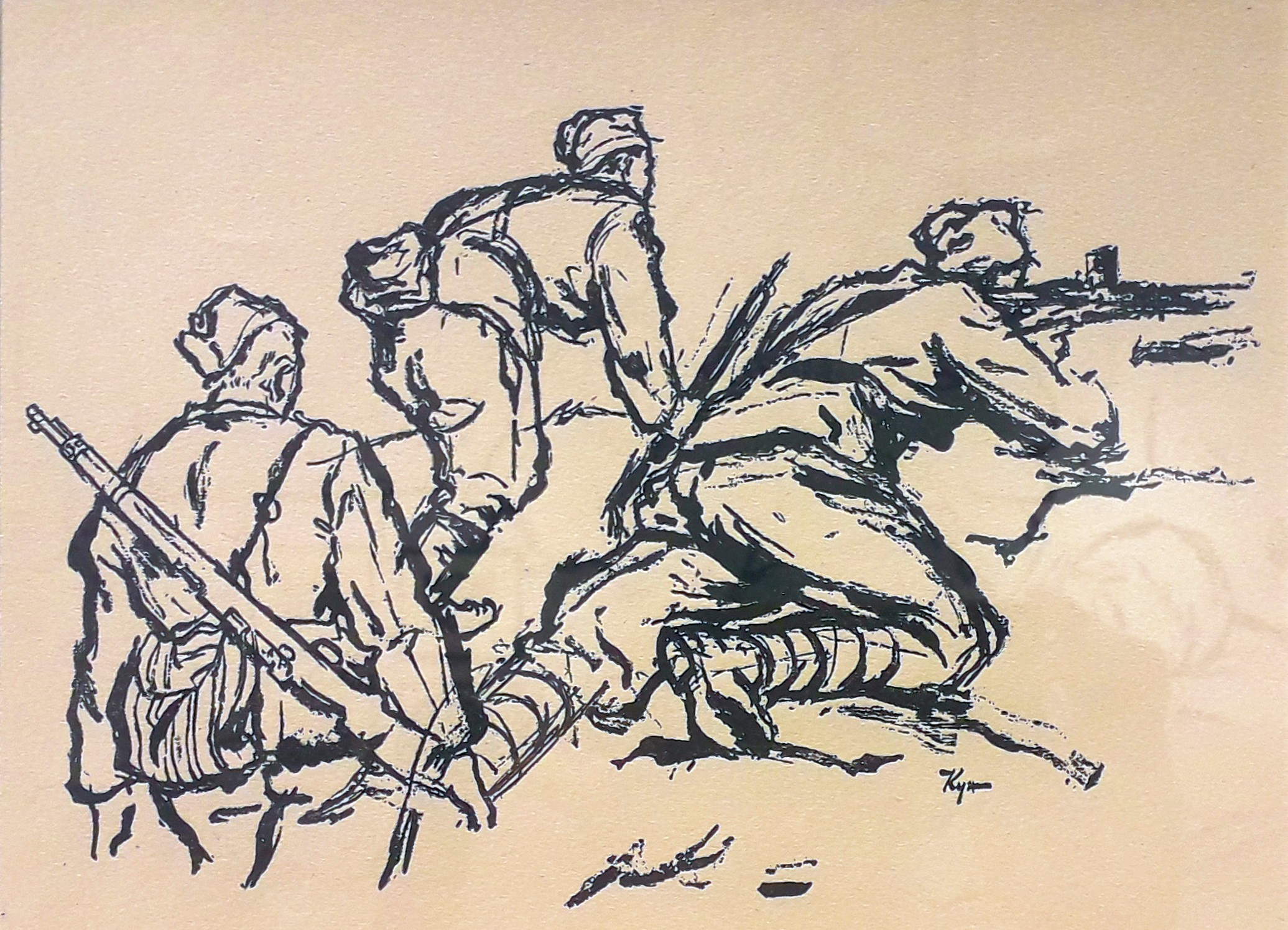

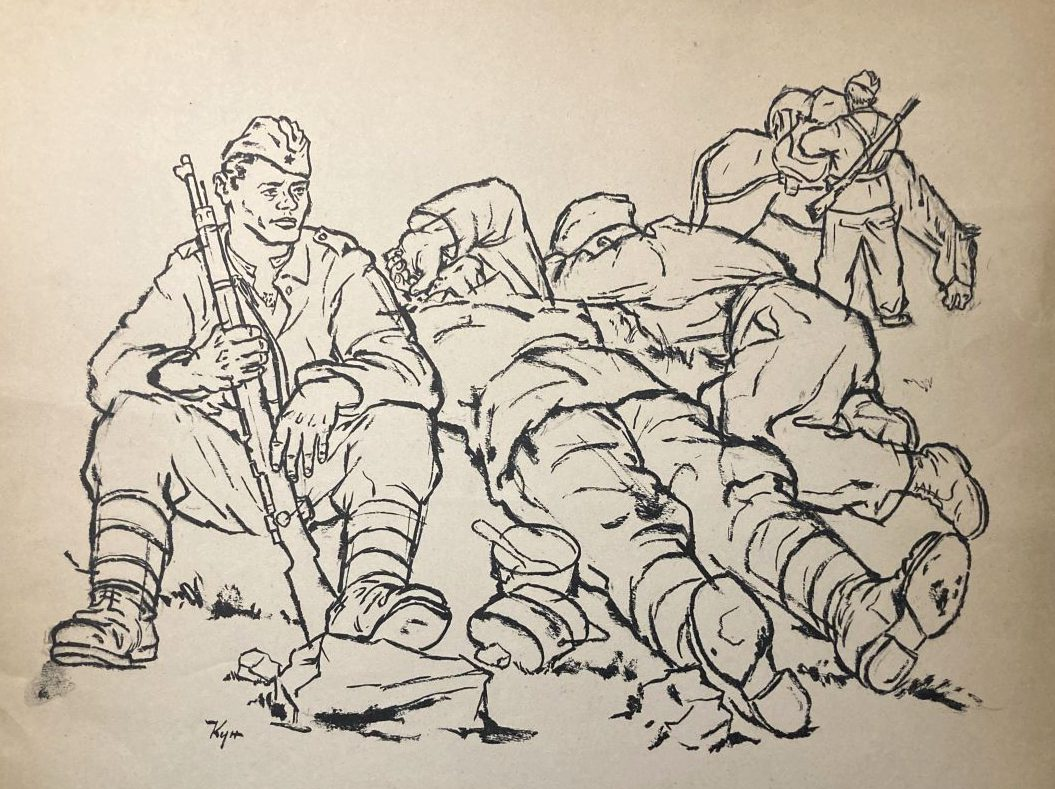

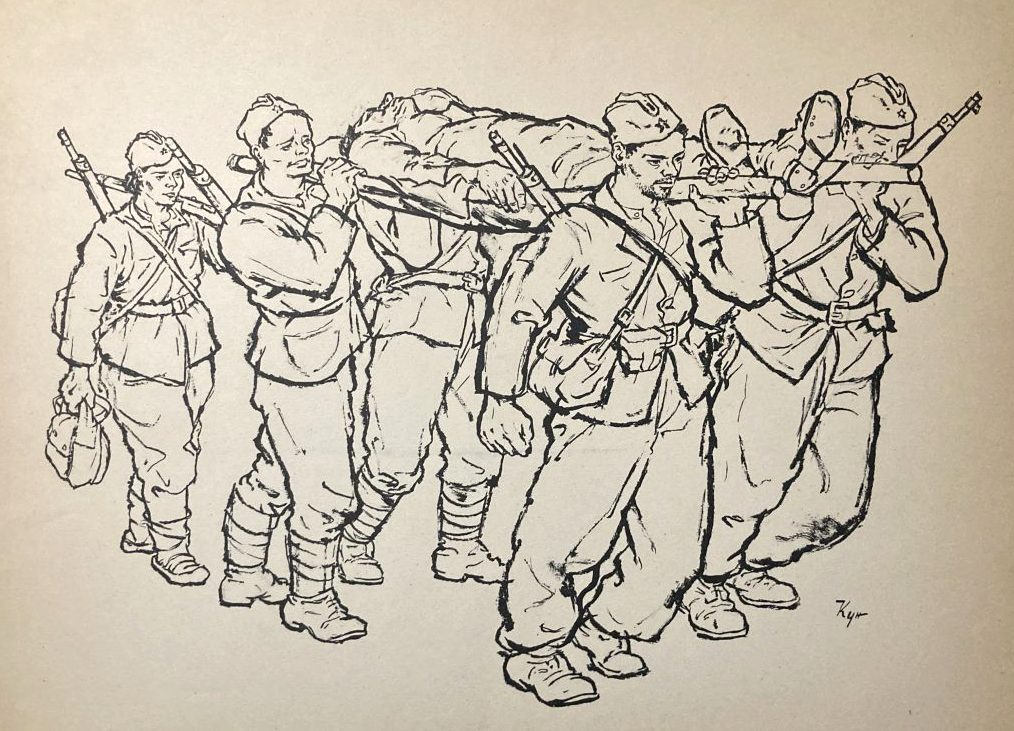

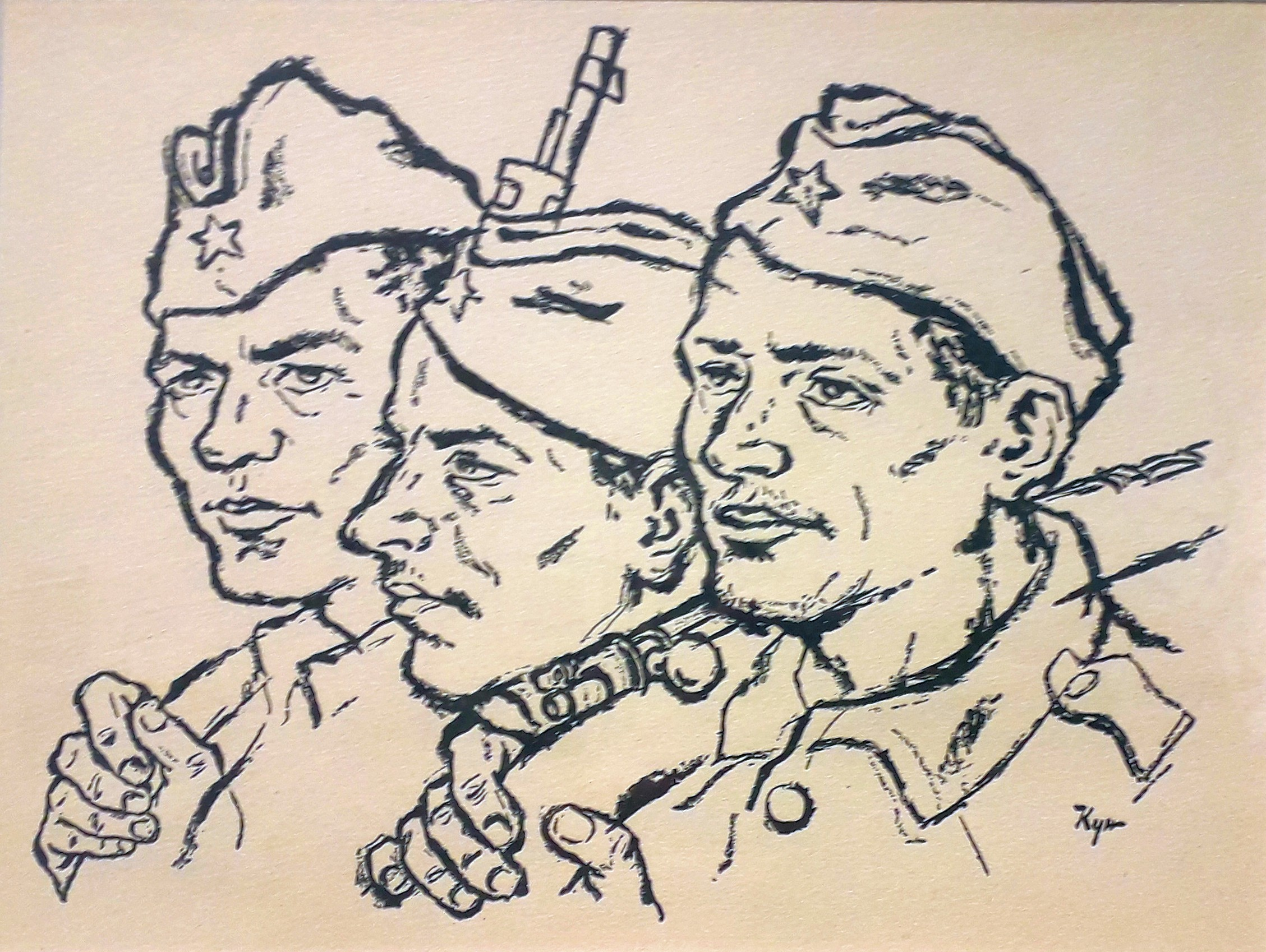

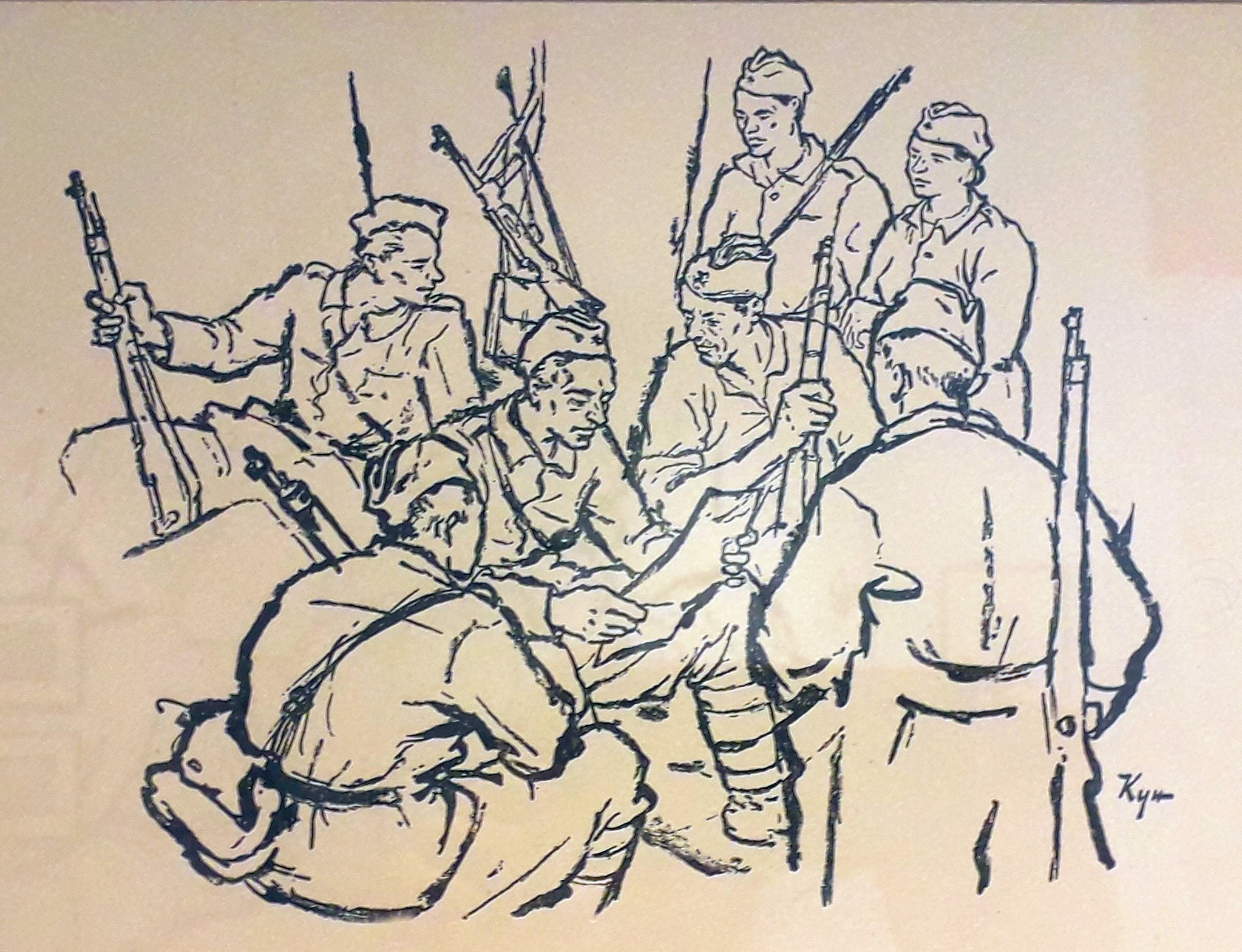

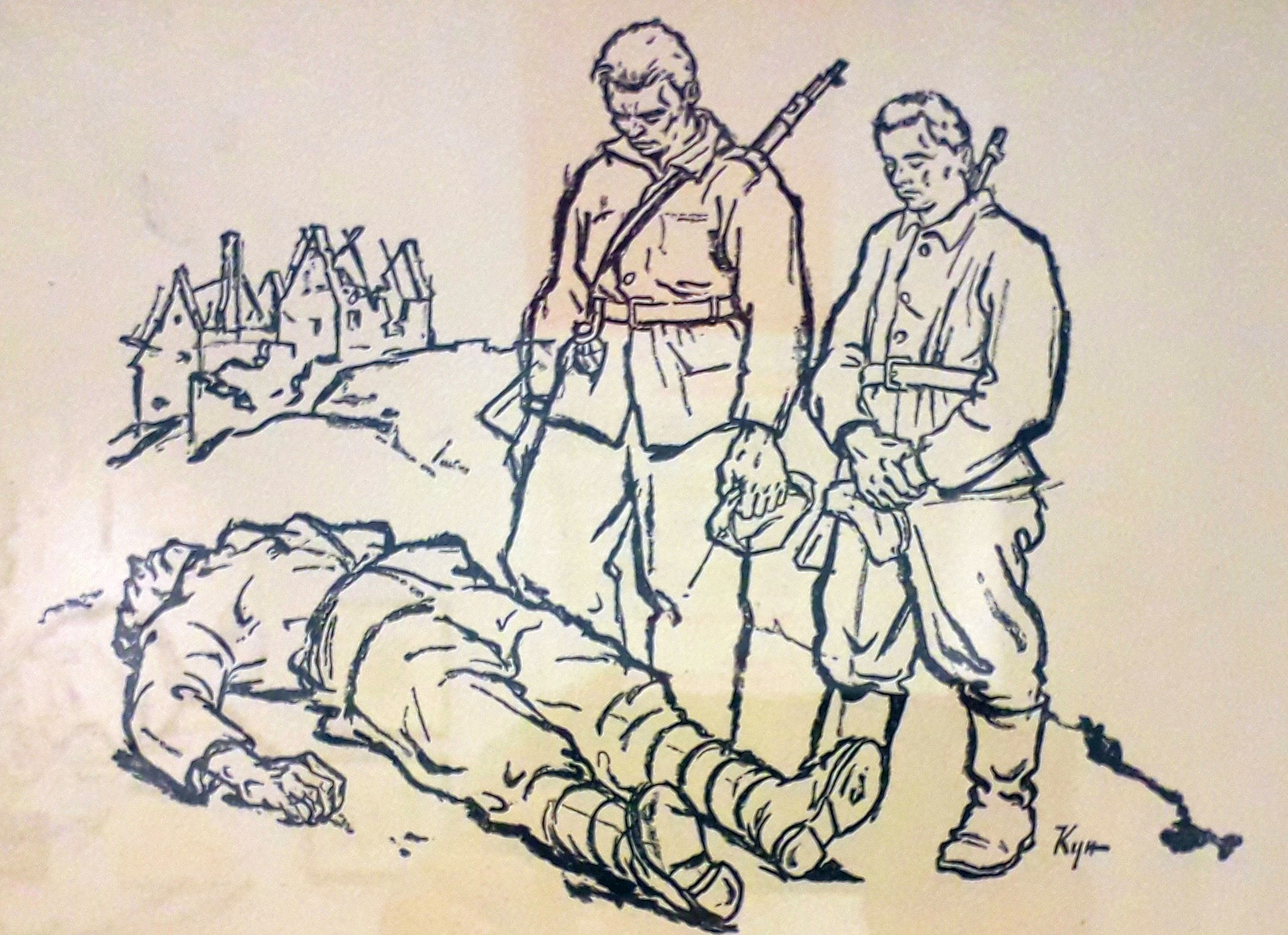

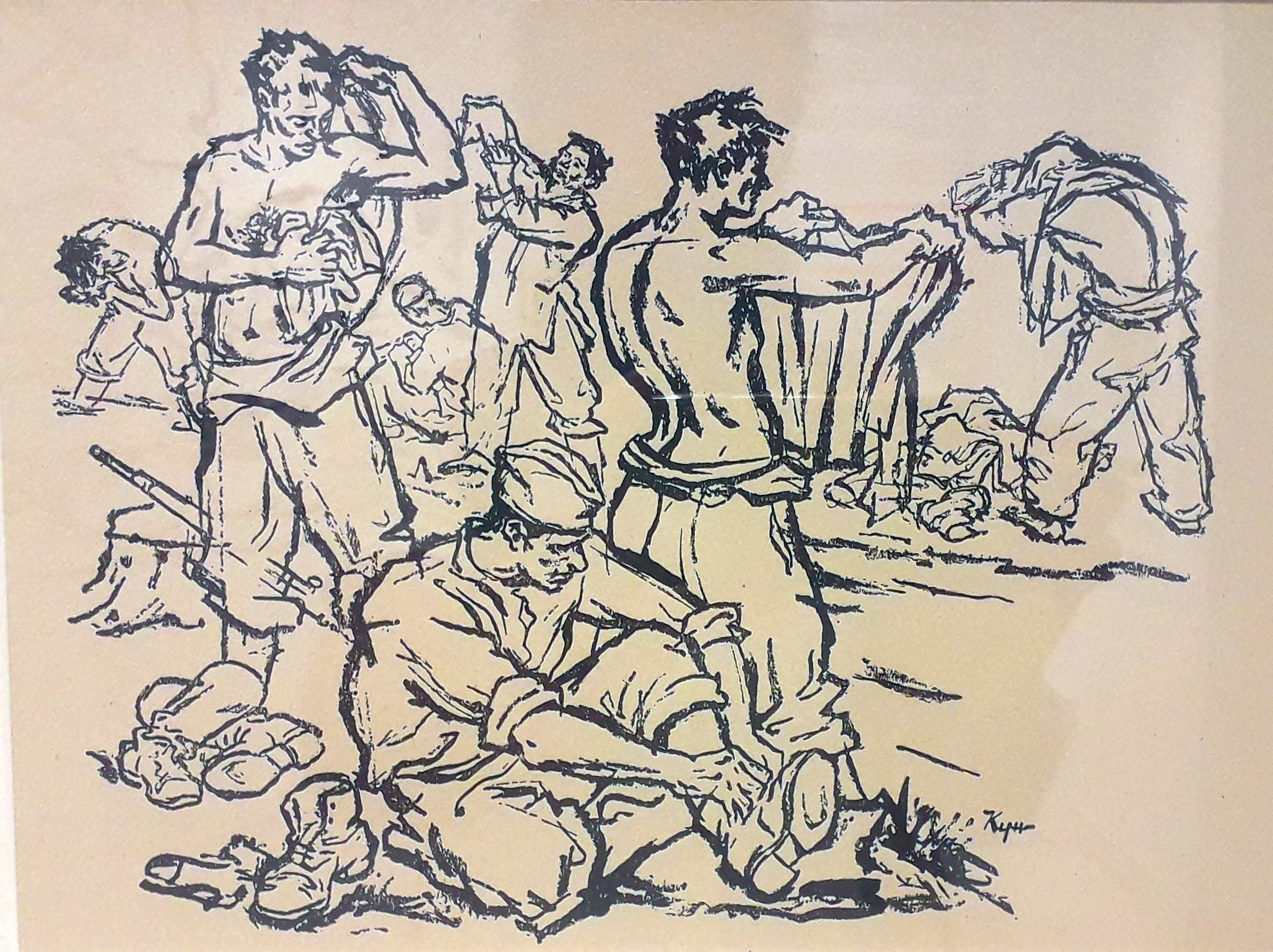

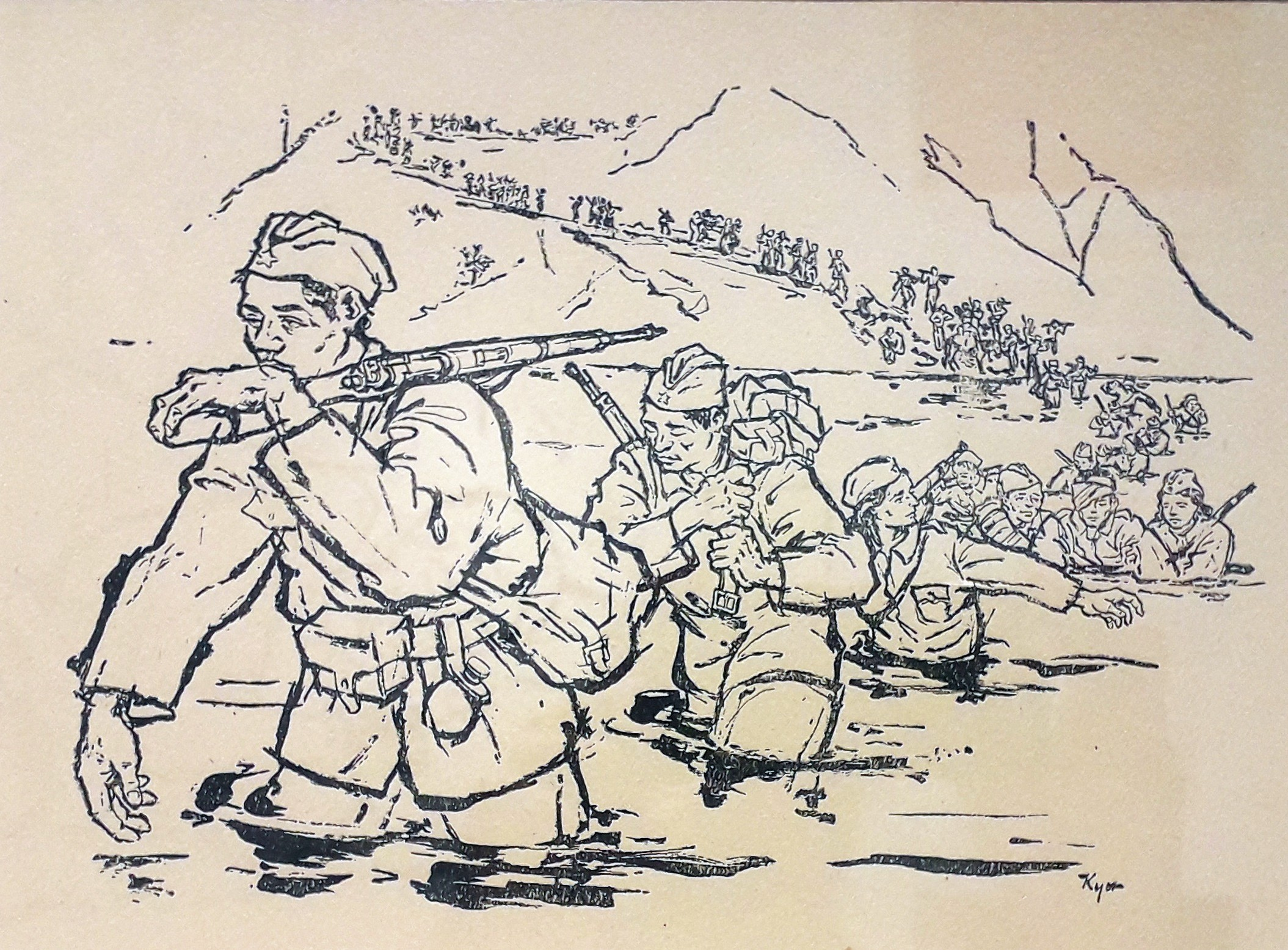

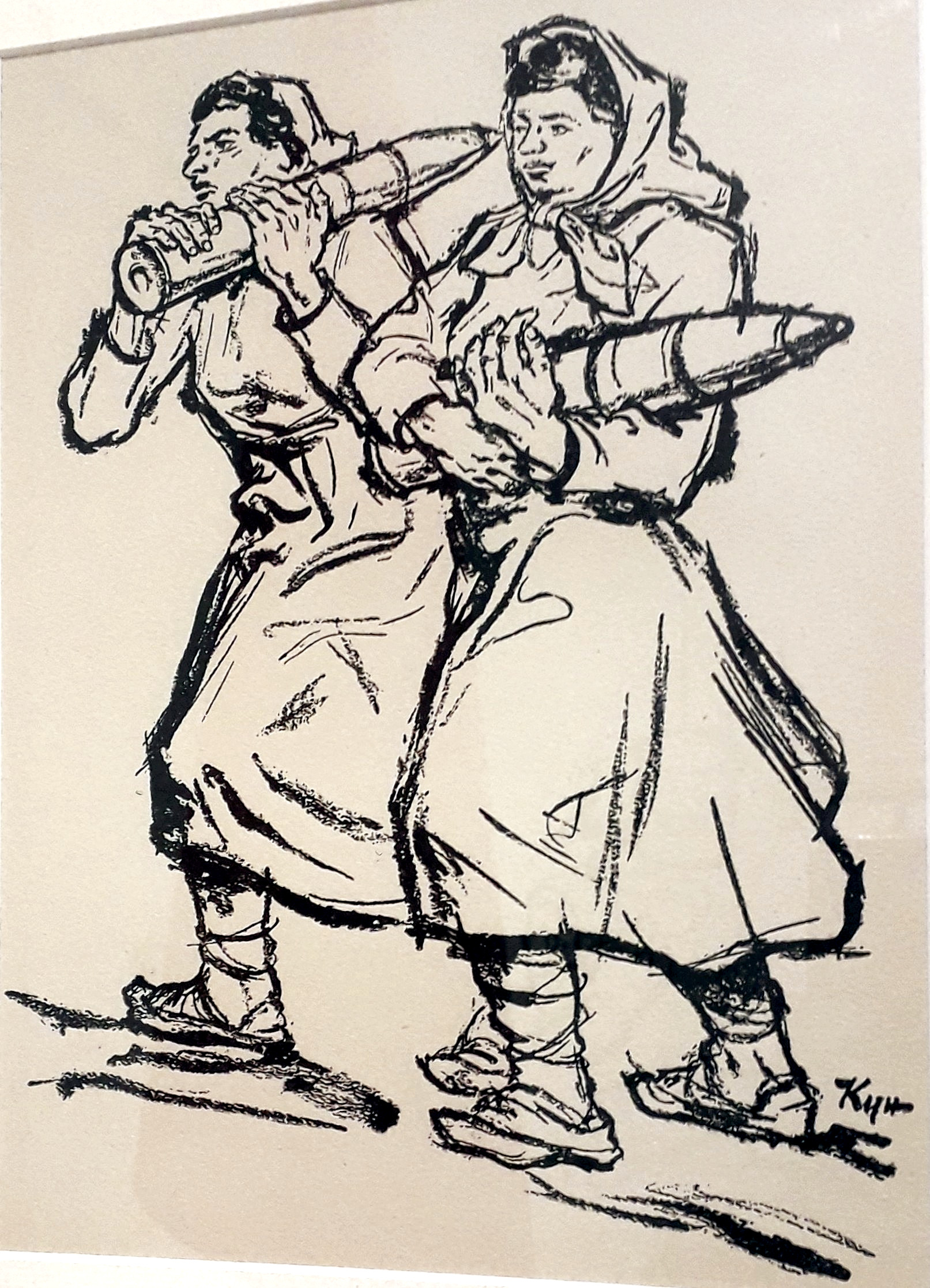

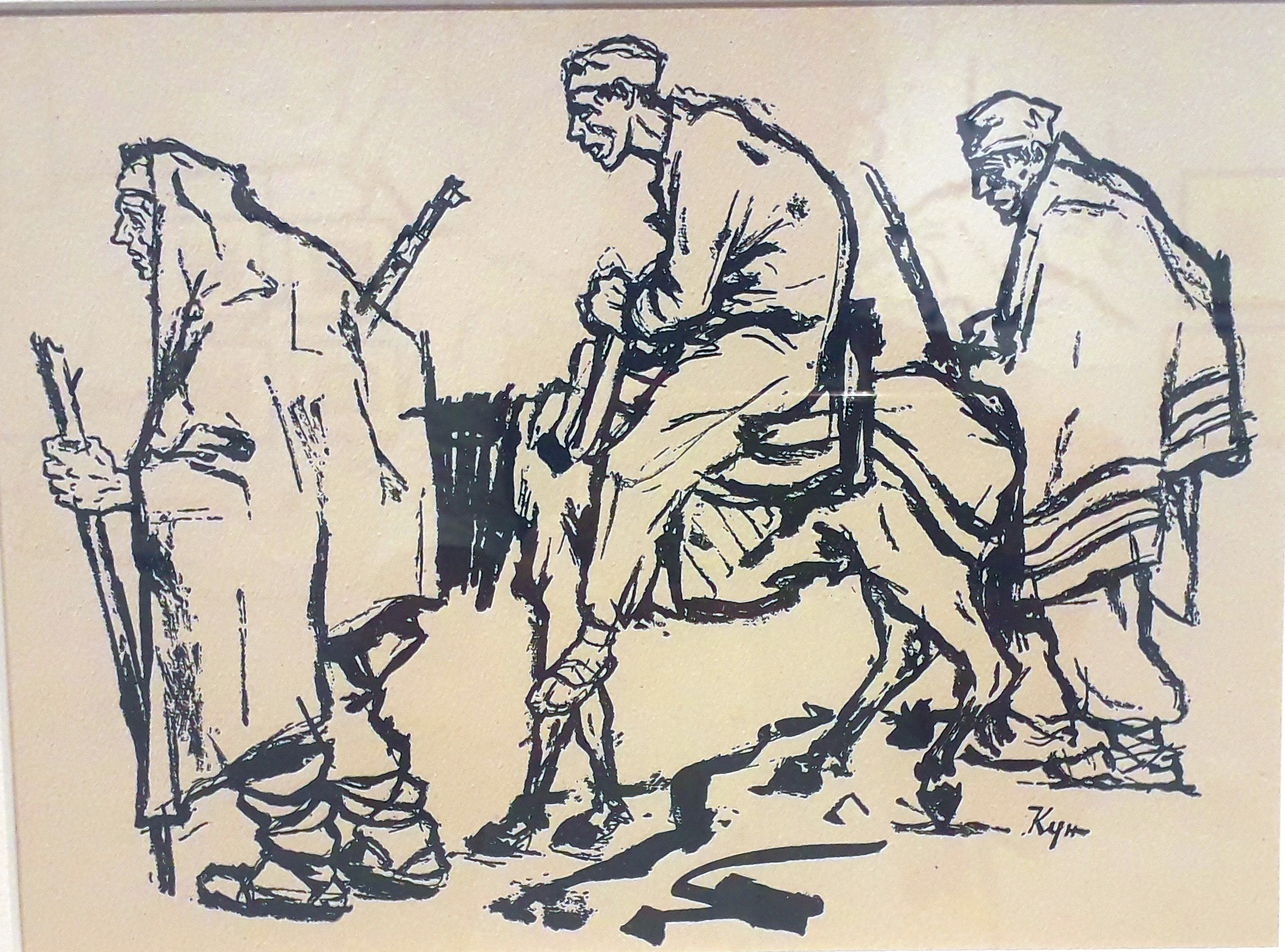

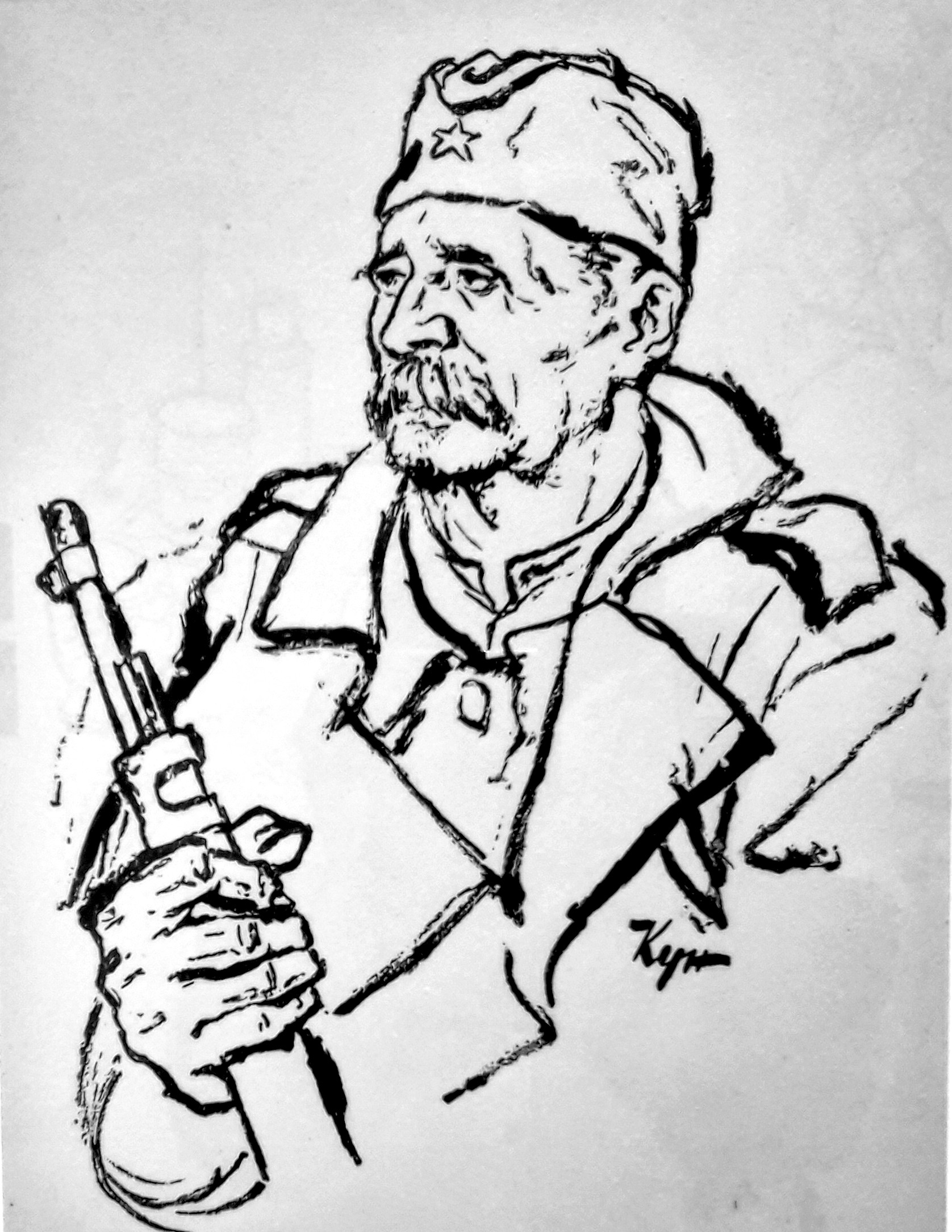

=== Controversy ===
After the liberation of Belgrade, the dean of the Technical Faculty under the German occupation, Branko Popović, was sentenced and executed as a national traitor by the new Yugoslav authorities in November 1944. In the official explanation of the verdict, it was stated that "Dr. Branko Popović, professor at the University and dean of the Technical Faculty" was "the closest associate of Minister Jonić," and as such, "denounced to Bećarević a number of freedom-loving students and citizens," who were subsequently sent to German camps, and that he also worked "on the fascistization of the Serbian people through the so-called Serbian Civil Plan." Together with other defendants in the first post-war trial in Belgrade, the Military War Court sentenced him to "the death penalty, to be carried out by shooting, the permanent loss of civil rights, and the confiscation of all property."

Later, his apartment was assigned to the partisan family Andrejević-Kun, where Đorđe and Nada moved in with their daughter Mira. Based on this, Popović's descendants decades later accused Kun of "taking over the property of his dead colleague," claiming that "Popović's property on Knez Mihailova Street was the real reason behind his execution without a trial."

=== Post-war work ===
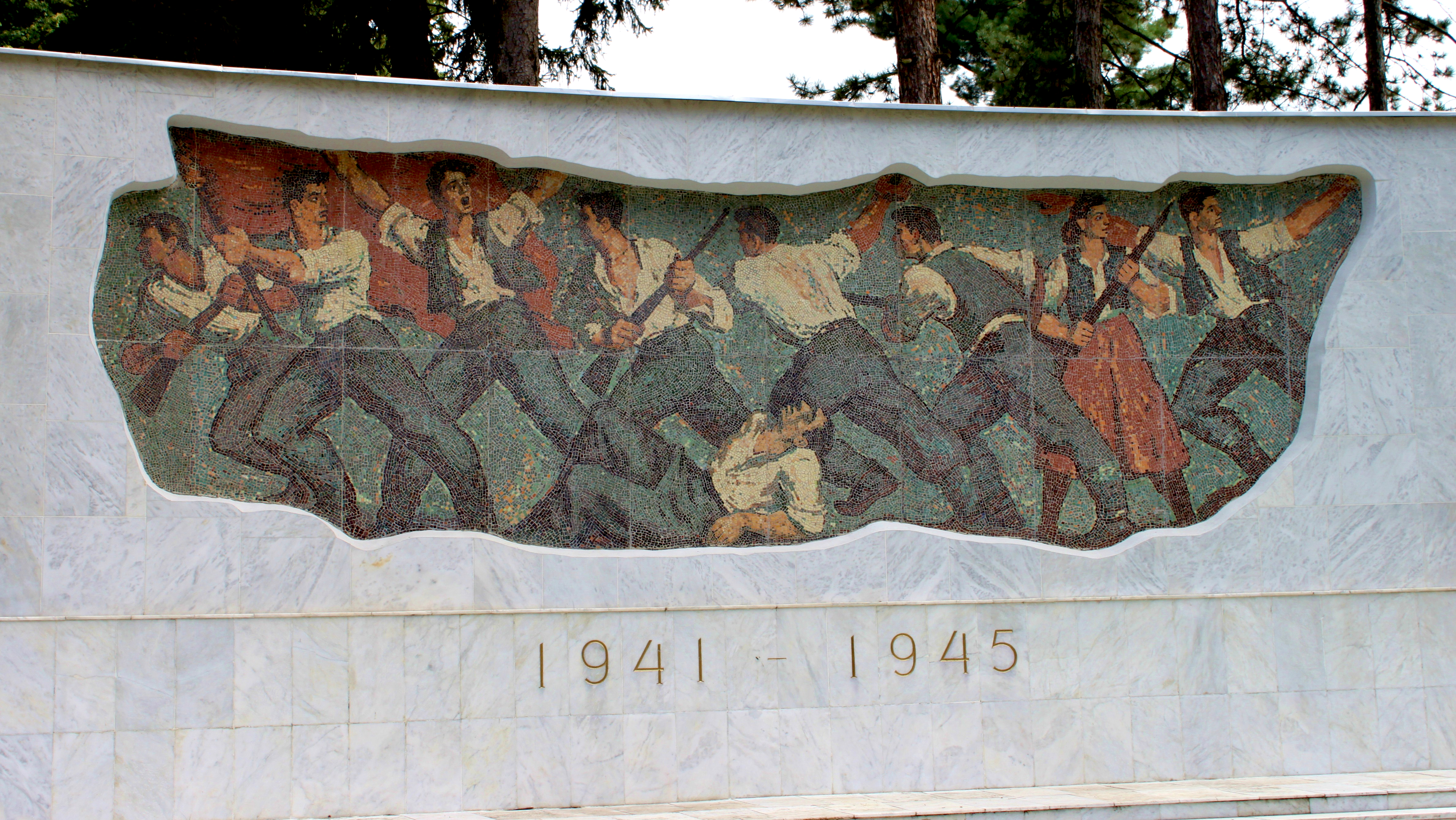
Kun's mosaic on the War Memorial in Ivanjica, 1957

In 1946, Kun's set of drawings Partisans (Partizani) were awarded the Yugoslav Federation Prize for Graphics. In 1949 his oil work Witnesses of Horror (Svedoci užasa) won the Yugoslav Federation Prize for Painting. He created three mosaics, one at the War Memorial in Ivanjica, a second on the façade of a public building in Kragujevac, and the third at the Holocaust Museum in Paris. In 1947, he obtained the title of master painter and held exhibitions in Belgrade (1953 and 1959), Kragujevac, Čačak, Niš, Skopje and Sombor, and in Berlin in 1963. His work was further influenced by George Grosz and Frans Masereel.

From 1945 to 1964 he was a full-time professor at the Academy of Fine Arts in Belgrade, and, from 1959 to 1963, he was Dean of the Department of Fine Arts of the University of Belgrade, after the academy had been incorporated into the university. From 1950 he was a correspondent, and from 1958 a regular member of the Serbian Academy of Sciences and Arts. From 1957 to 1960 he was the president of the Yugoslav Federation of Artists. He illustrated and furnished numerous literary works, including Woman in a Shirt (Žena u košulji), Column (Kolona), Red Fish (Crvene ribe), Fish on White (Riba na belom) and others.

He was elected as deputy of the National Assembly of SR Serbia and a member of the Central Committee of the League of Communists of Serbia.

Kun died of a heart attack on 17 January 1964 in Belgrade. He was buried on 19 January in the Alley of People's Heroes at the New Cemetery in Belgrade.

== Accolades ==
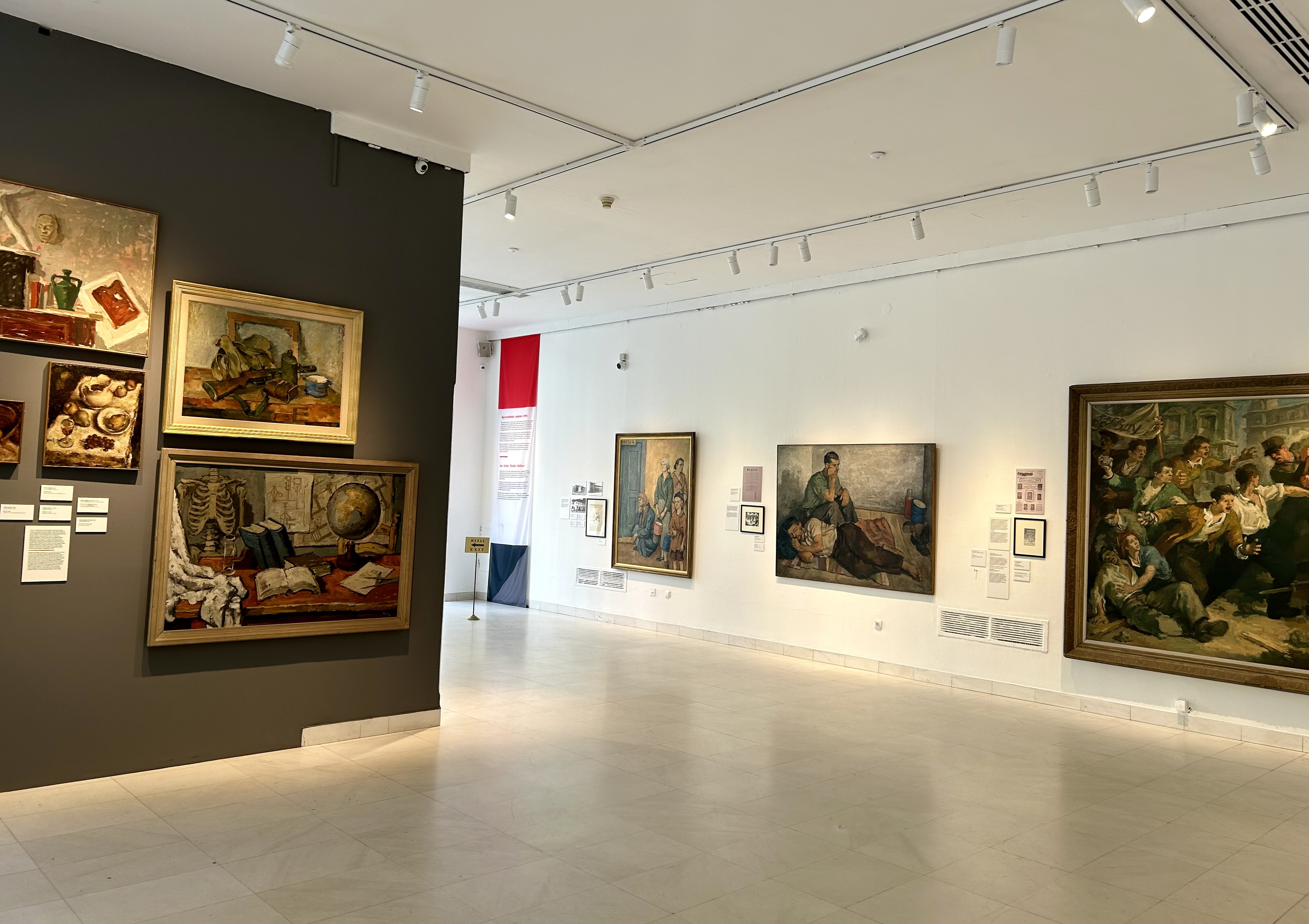
Exhibition Kun: Artist-worker-fighter, SANU Gallery, 2024

=== Art awards ===
- First prize for the Coat of arms of Belgrade (1931)
- Award for graphics of the State Printing Office in Belgrade (1940)
- First prize for graphics of the Committee for Culture and Art of the FNRJ government (1947)
- First award for painting of the Presidency of the Government of FNRJ (1949)

=== Orders ===
- Order of the People's Hero
- Order of People's Liberation
- Order of Brotherhood and Unity
- Order of the Partisan Star in three rows
- Order for Courage
- Commemorative Medal of the Partisans of 1941

== Gallery ==
Emblems and designs

Kun's design for the coat of arms of Belgrade, 1931

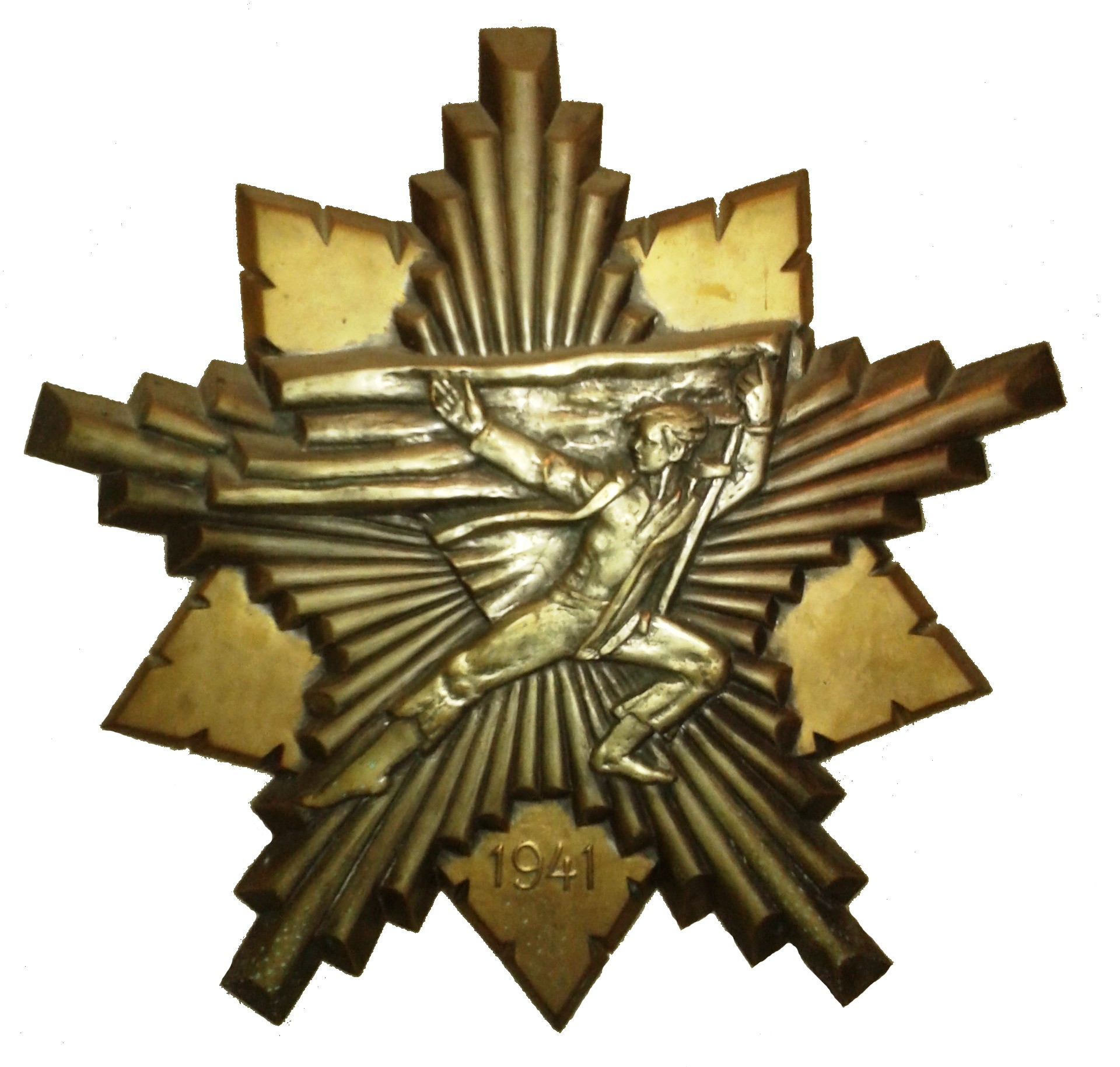
Commemorative Medal of the Partisans of 1941, designed by Kun and Antun Augustinčić, 1941

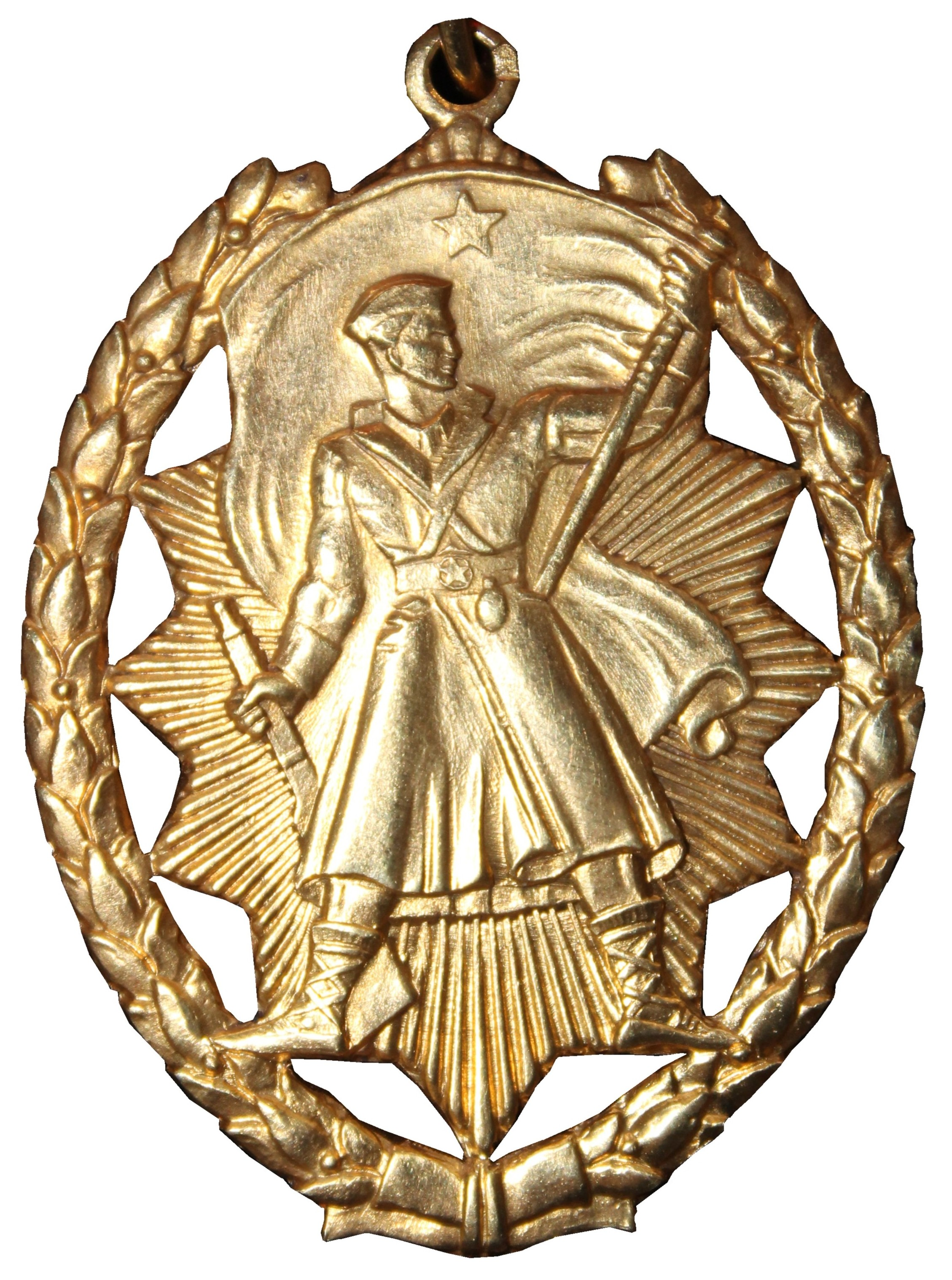
Order of the People's Hero, designed by Kun and Antun Augustinčić, 1942

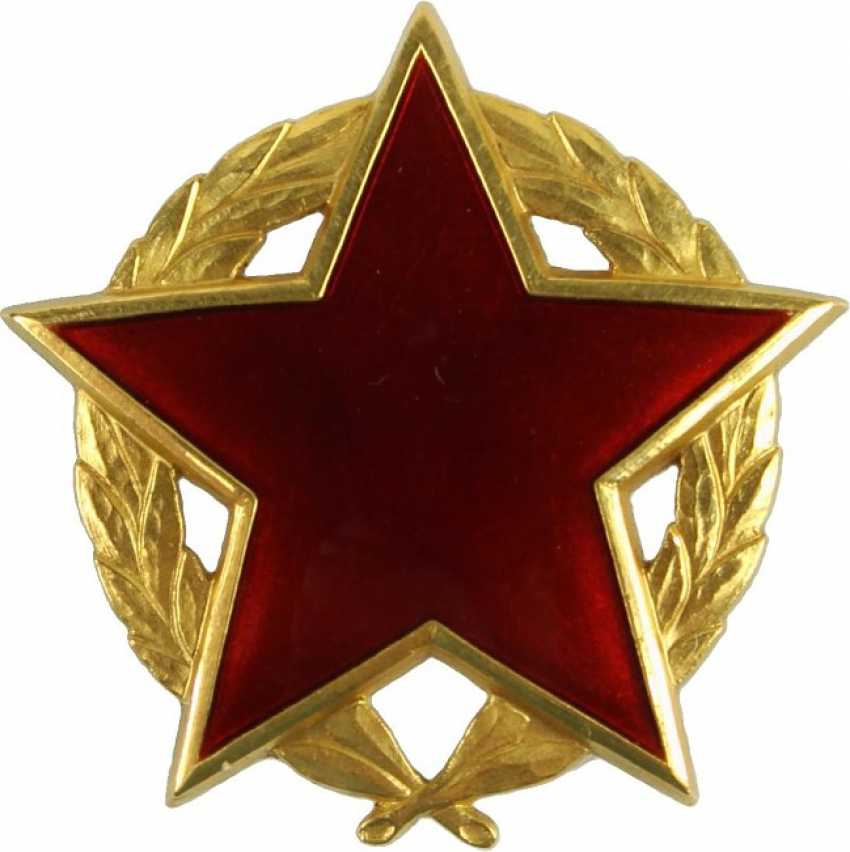
Order of the Partisan Star, designed by Kun and Antun Augustinčić, 1943

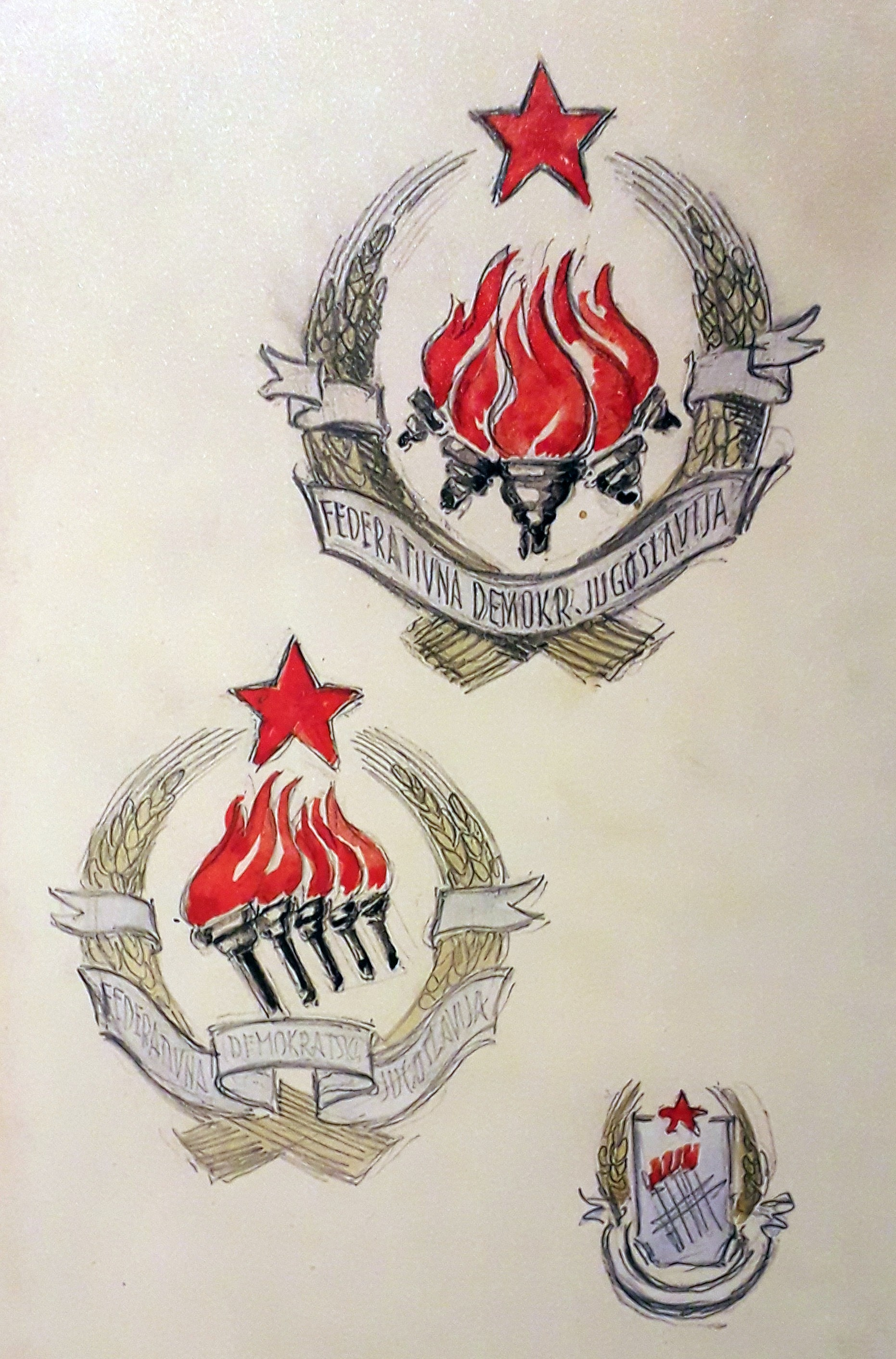
Sketches for the emblem of Yugoslavia, 1943

Emblem of Yugoslavia, final version

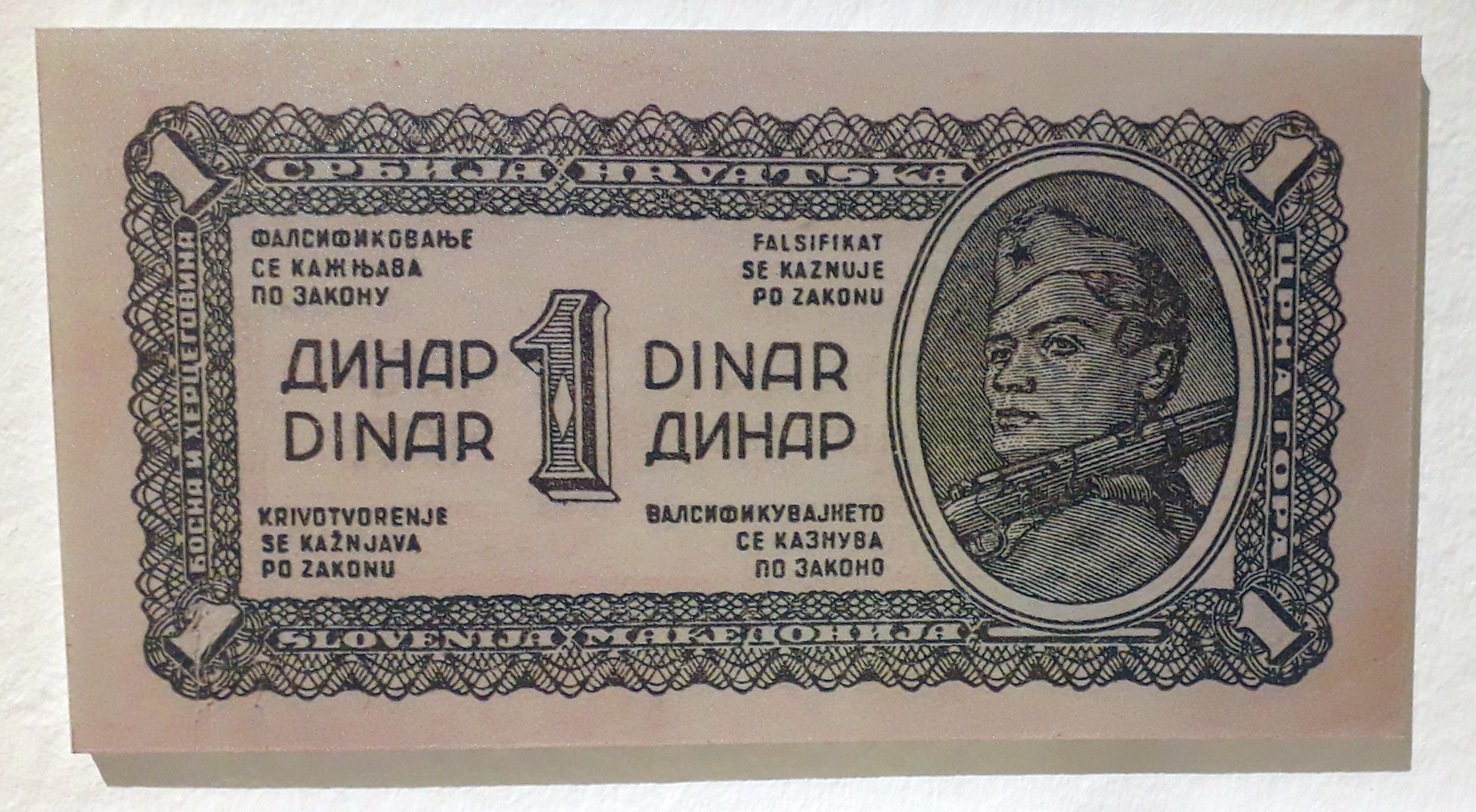
Kun's design for the first Yugoslav dinar banknote, 1944

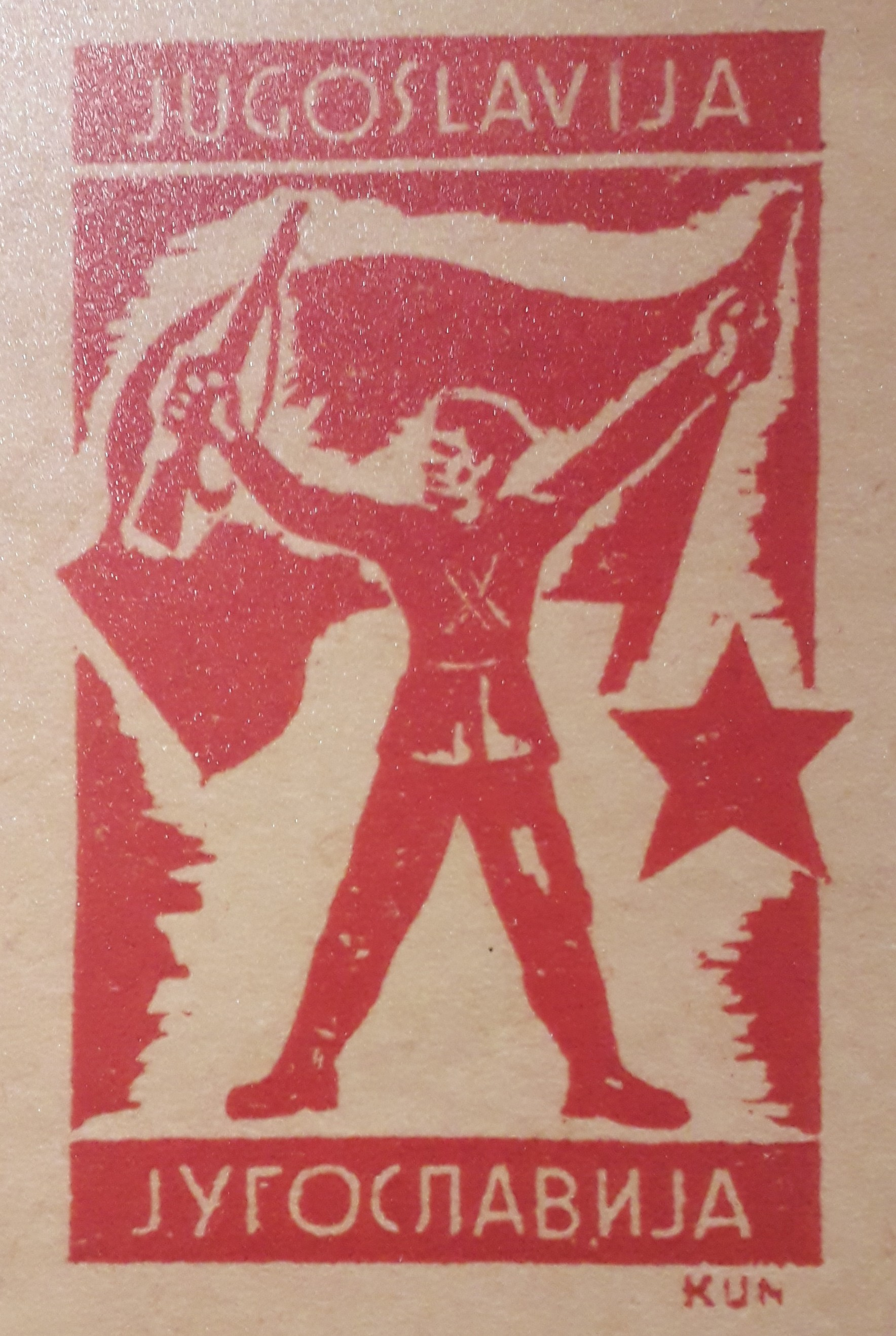
The first postage stamp of the new Yugoslav state, 1945

Emblem of SR Serbia, 1947
Prison graphics

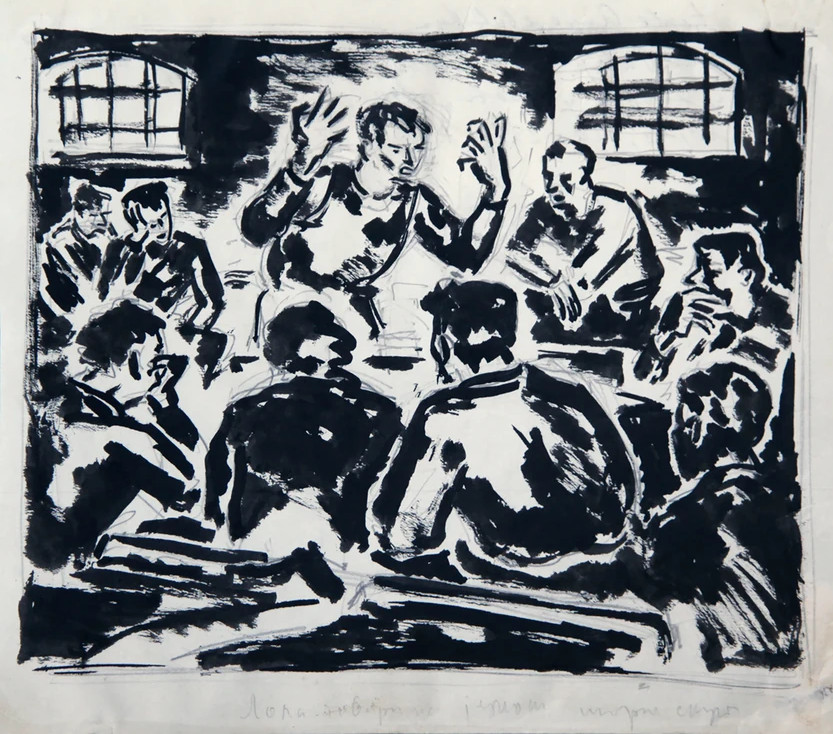
Ivo Lola Ribar speaking to Bileća prisoners, 1940

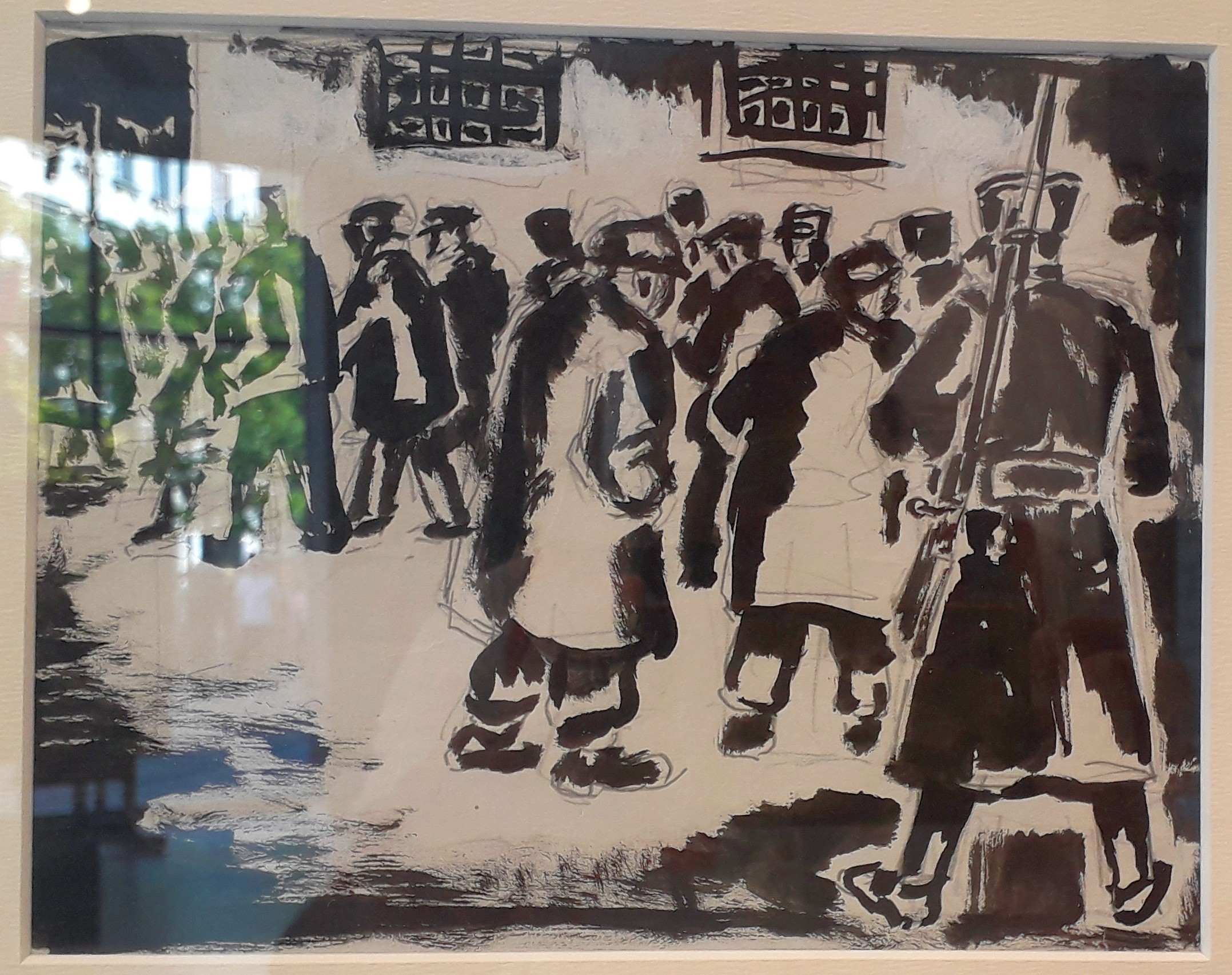
The prisoners' first walk around the campyard, 1940

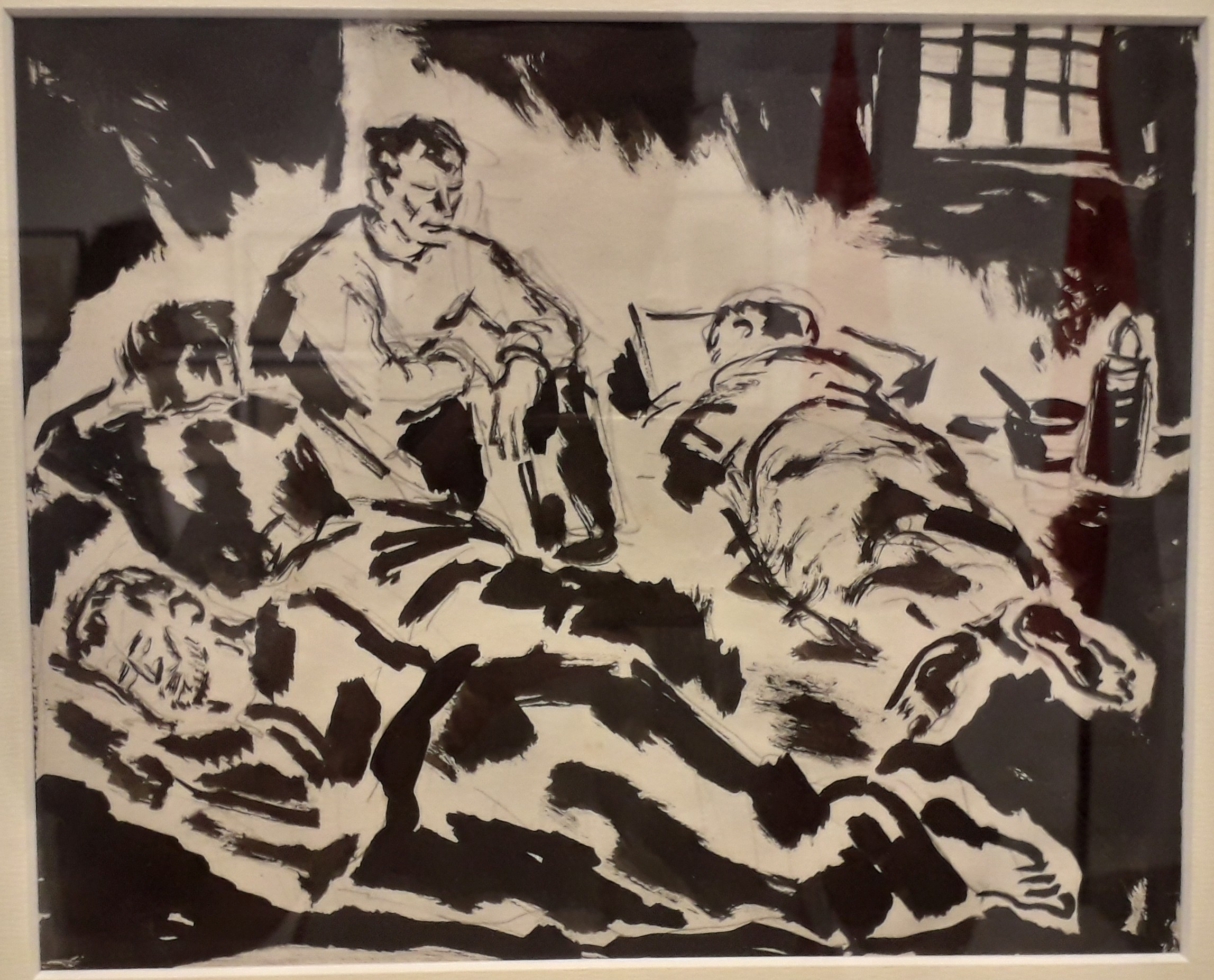
Glavnjača cell, 1940

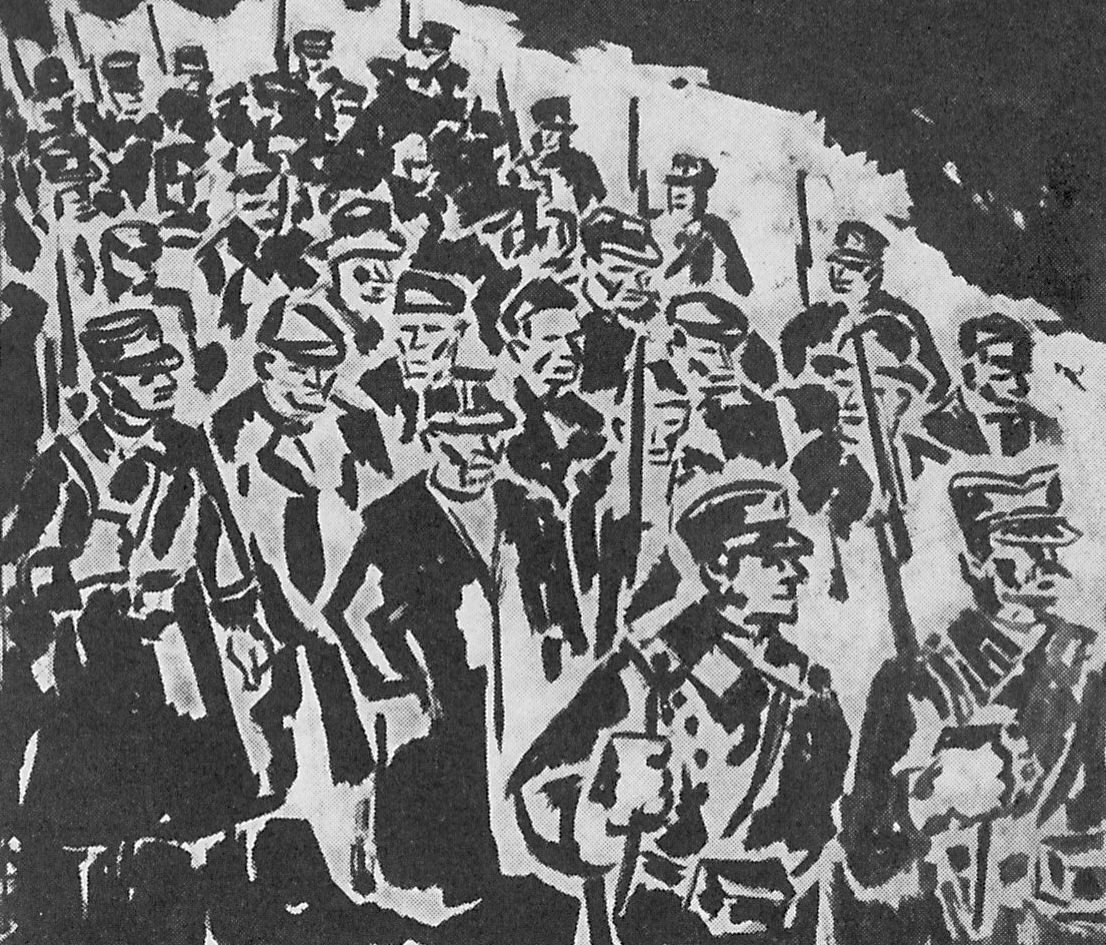
Gendarmes escorting prisoners to camp Bileća, 1940

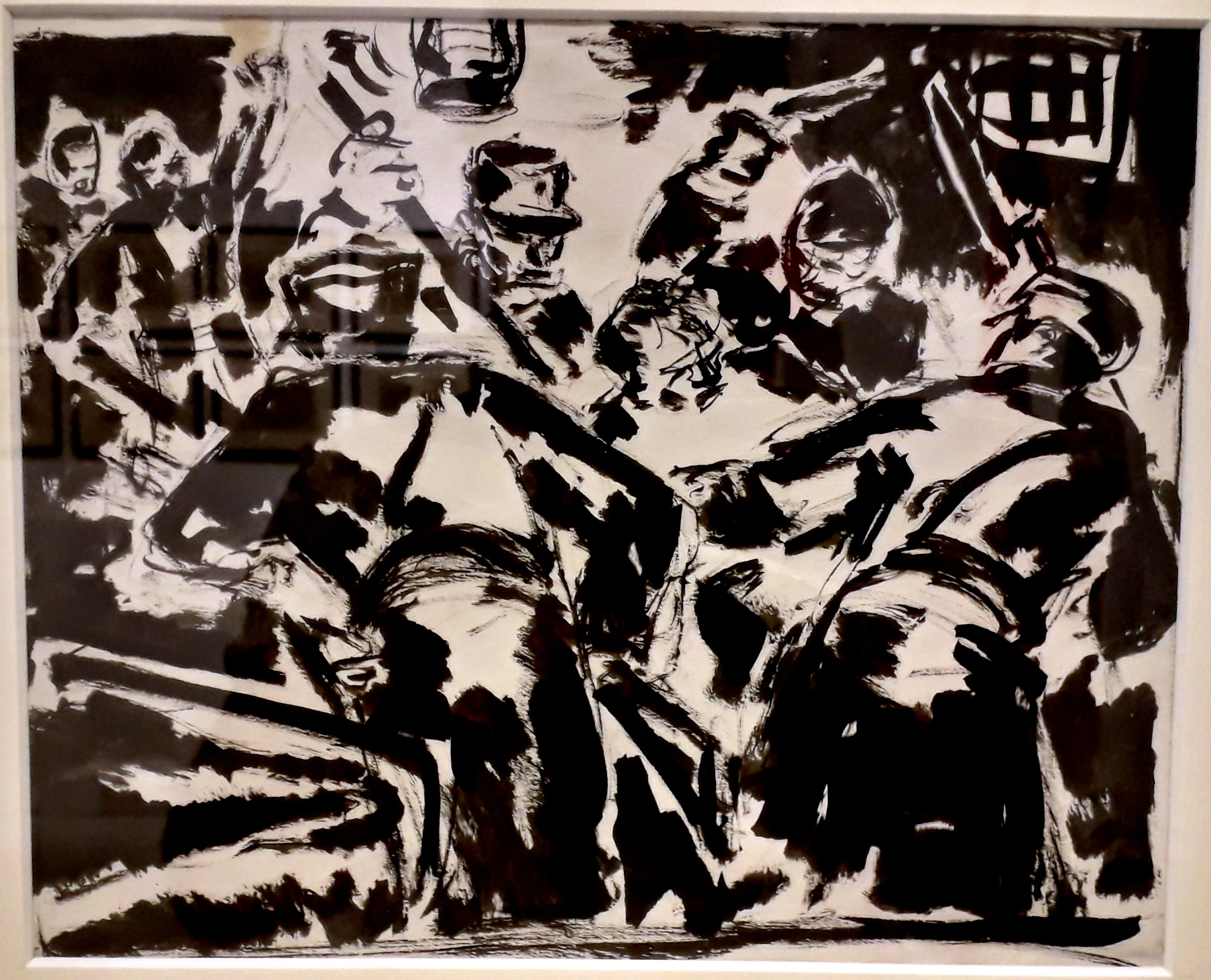
Gendarmes beating Moša Pijade at the Bileća camp,1940
Posters

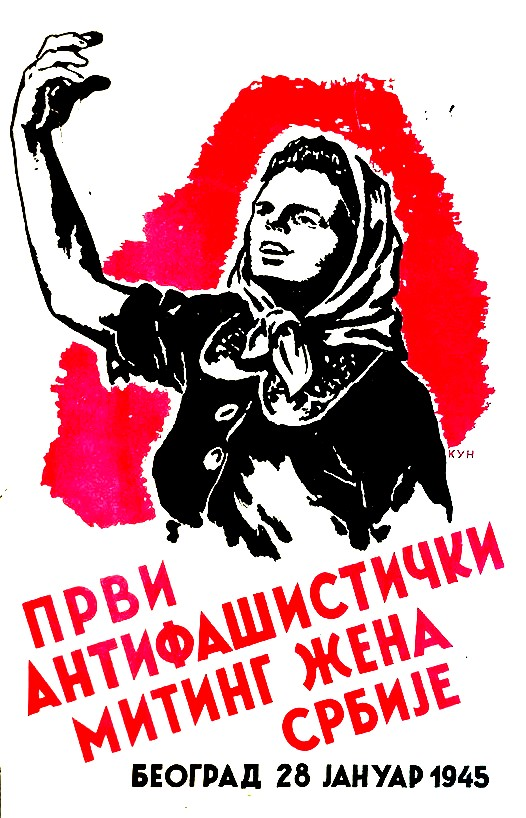
Poster for the first Serbian-held Women's Antifascist Front of Yugoslavia meeting, 1945

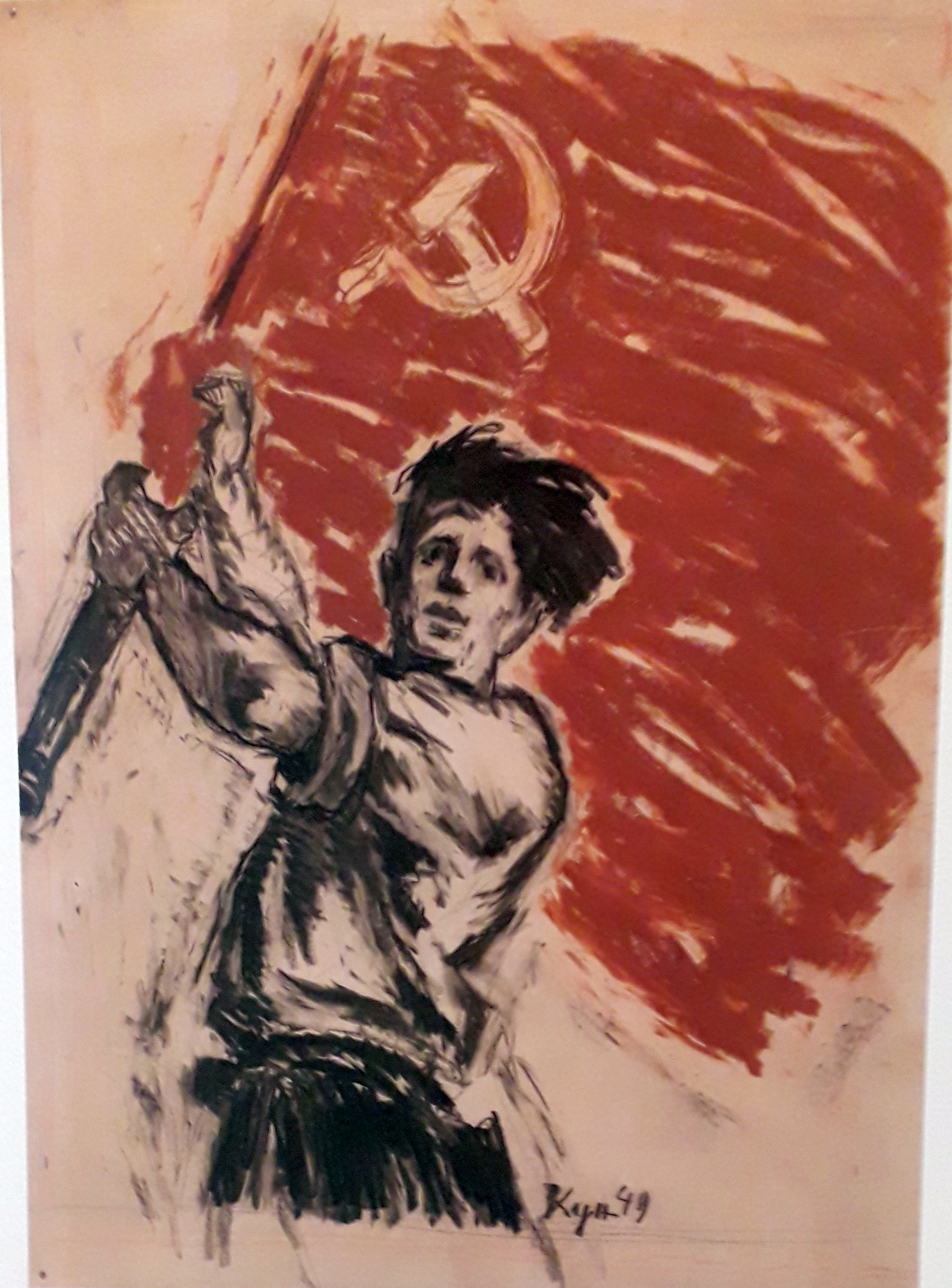
For Freedom, Peace and Socialism (Za slobodu, mir i socijalizam), 1949

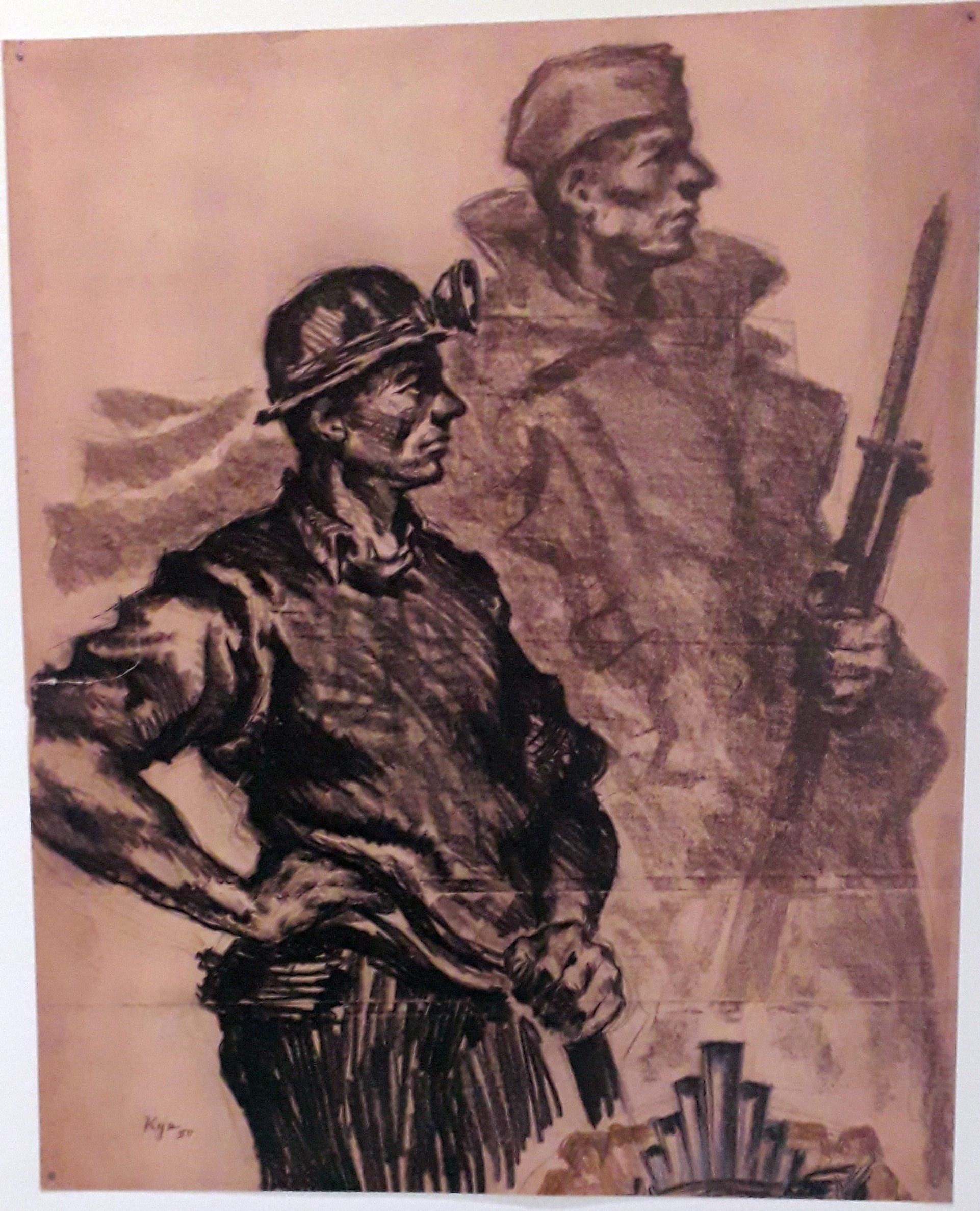
Poster promoting the Yugoslav Five-year Plan, 1950

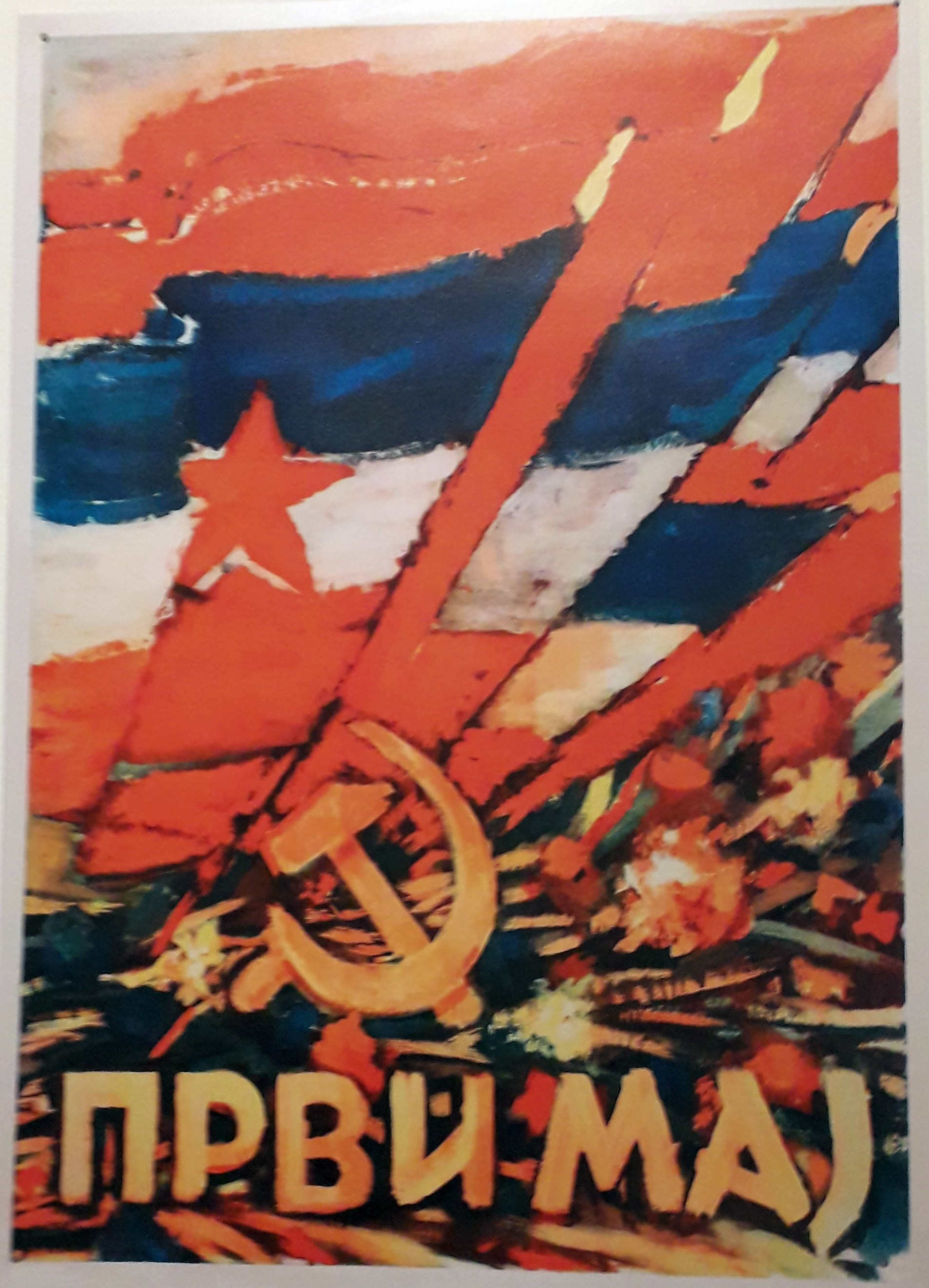
Belgrade May Day celebration, 1955
Stamps featuring Kun's artwork

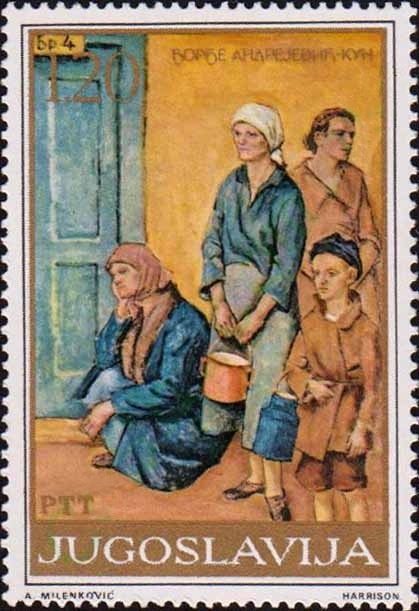
Postage stamp with Kun's painting Public kitchen #4, 1975

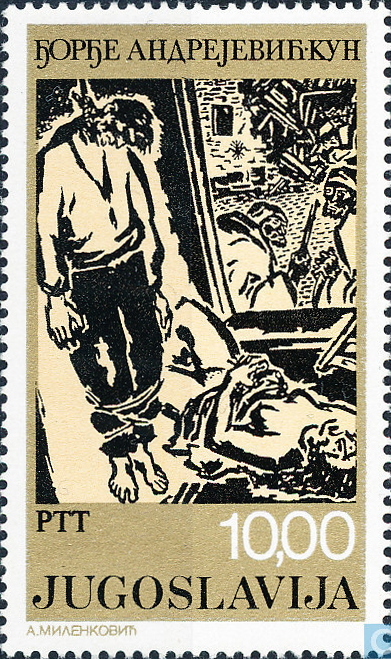
Postage stamp with Kun's graphic from the Spanish Civil War (Hanged Man and Raped Woman), 1978

== Bibliography ==
- Encyclopedia Britannica (A—B) (in Serbo-Croatian). Belgrade: Narodna knjiga, Politika. 2005. ISBN 8633120755.
- Ko je ko u Jugoslaviji — biografski podaci o jugoslovenskim savremenicima (in Serbo-Croatian). Belgrade: Sedma sila. 1957.(COBISS.RS 4864263)
- Vujošević, Ubavka (1977). Tito u Beogradu 1926—1944 (in Serbo-Croatian). Belgrade: Muzej grada Beograda, Jugoslovenska knjiga, Glas.(COBISS.RS 50415879)
- Mala enciklopedija Prosveta tom I. Prosveta. 1978.(COBISS.RS 445703)
- Protić, Đorđe (1978). Svetlosti revolucije (in Serbo-Croatian). Priština: Jedinstvo.(COBISS.RS 50534151)
- Beograd u ratu i revoluciji 1941—1945. Belgrade: Historical Archive of Belgrade. 1984.(COBISS.RS 37352711)
- Leksikon Narodnooslobodilačkog rata i revolucije u Jugoslaviji 1941—1945. tom I (in Serbo-Croatian). Belgrade/ Ljubljana: Narodna knjiga—Partizanska knjiga. 1980.(COBISS.RS 49291527)
