= List of French flags =

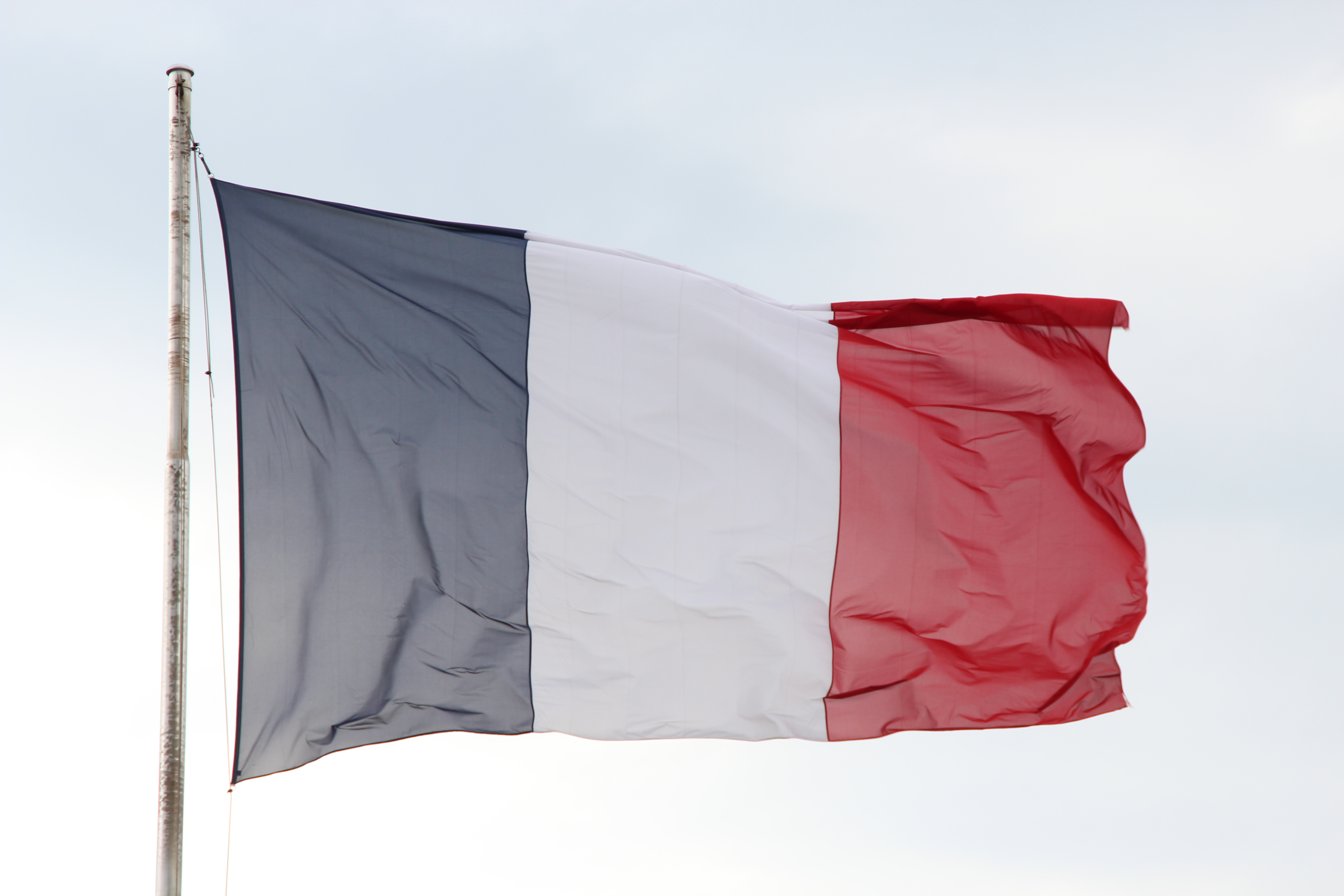
Le Tricolore, the national flag of France

This list includes flags that either have been in use or are currently used by France, French overseas collectivites, the sui generis collectivity and the French overseas territory.

The French Society of Vexillology is the authority on the flying of flags in France and maintains the only official register of flags for the country. It was established in 1985 and as part of the Comité des travaux historiques et scientifiques operates under the authority of the Minister of Higher Education, Research and Innovation. The Breton Vexillology Society holds a similar role within Brittany.

== National flags ==
| Flag | Date | Party | Description |
|---|---|---|---|
| | 2020–present; originally adopted in 1794 | National flag of the French Second Republic, Second French Empire, French Third Republic, French State, Provisional Government of the French Republic, French Fourth Republic, and the French Fifth Republic. Originally adopted on 15 February 1794 and interchangeable with the lighter version introduced in 1976. | A vertical tricolour of blue, white, and red (proportions 3:2). |
| | 1976–2020 | An interchangeable lighter version of the national flag of the French Fifth Republic from 1976. This version was abandoned by President Emmanuel Macron in July 2021 in favor of the version with darker shades. | A vertical tricolour of blue, white, and red (proportions 3:2). |
| | 2020–present; originally adopted in 1794 | Modern flag of France | |
| | 1976–2020 | Flag of France (vertical) | |

== Standards ==
=== Presidential Standards ===
| Flag | Date | Party | Description |
|---|---|---|---|
| | 1880–present | The Presidential and Prime Minister standard of France | A vertical tricolour of blue, white, and red (proportions 1:1). |
| | 1880–present | The Presidential and Prime Minister standard of France (variant) | A vertical tricolour of blue, white, and red (proportions 3:2). |
| | 1887–1894 | Presidential standard of Sadi Carnot | A vertical tricolour of blue, white, and red (proportions 1:1) with the golden "C". |
| | 1894–1895 | Presidential standard of Jean Casimir-Perier | A vertical tricolour of blue, white, and red (proportions 1:1) with the golden "CP". |
| | 1895–1899 | Presidential standard of Félix Faure | A vertical tricolour of blue, white, and red (proportions 1:1) with the golden "FF". |
| | 1899–1906 | Presidential standard of Émile Loubet | A vertical tricolour of blue, white, and red (proportions 1:1) with the golden "EL". |
| | 1906–1913 | Presidential standard of Armand Fallières | A vertical tricolour of blue, white, and red (proportions 1:1) with the golden "AF". |
| | 1913–1920 | Presidential standard of Raymond Poincaré | A vertical tricolour of blue, white, and red (proportions 1:1) with the golden "RP". |
| | 1920 | Presidential standard of Paul Deschanel | A vertical tricolour of blue, white, and red (proportions 1:1) with the golden "PD". |
| | 1920–1924 | Presidential standard of Alexandre Millerand | A vertical tricolour of blue, white, and red (proportions 1:1) with the golden "AM". |
| | 1924–1931 | Presidential standard of Gaston Doumergue | A vertical tricolour of blue, white, and red (proportions 1:1) with the golden "GD". |
| | 1931–1932 | Presidential standard of Paul Doumer | A vertical tricolour of blue, white, and red (proportions 1:1) with the golden "PD". |
| | 1932–1940 | Presidential standard of Albert Lebrun | A vertical tricolour of blue, white, and red (proportions 1:1) with the golden "AL". |
| | 1940–1944 | Presidential standards of Philippe Pétain | A vertical tricolour of blue, white, and red with an axe and seven golden stars. |
| | 1947–1954 | Presidential standard of Vincent Auriol | A vertical tricolour of blue, white, and red (proportions 1:1) with the golden "VA". |
| | 1958–1959 | Presidential standard of René Coty | A vertical tricolour of blue, white, and red (proportions 1:1) with the golden "RC". |
| | 1959–1969 | Presidential standards of Charles de Gaulle | A vertical tricolour of blue, white, and red (proportions 3:2) with the red Cross of Lorraine. |
| | 1959–1969 | Presidential standards of Charles de Gaulle | A vertical tricolour of blue, white, and red (proportions 1:1) with the golden "CG" and the red Cross of Lorraine. |
| | 1969–1974 | Presidential standards of Georges Pompidou | A vertical tricolour of blue, white, and red with the golden "GP". |
| | 1974 | Presidential standards of Alain Poher | A vertical tricolour of blue, white, and red with the golden "AP". |
| | 1975–1981 | Presidential standards of Valéry Giscard d'Estaing | A vertical tricolour of blue, white, and red with the golden fasces. |
| | 1982–1995 | Presidential standards of François Mitterrand | A vertical tricolour of blue, white, and red with the golden oak tree. |
| | 1982–1995 | Presidential standards of François Mitterrand | A vertical tricolour of blue, white, and red with the golden "FM". |

=== Ministers Standards ===
| Flag | Date | Party | Description |
|---|---|---|---|
| | 1880–1958 | Flag of the Governor Colony | A swallowtail blue ensign with a vertical tricolour of blue, white, and red in its canton (proportions 1:2). |
| | 1976–present | Flag of the Minister of Overseas | A blue ensign with a vertical tricolour of blue, white, and red in its canton (proportions 1:1). |

=== Royal Standards ===
| Flag | Date | Party | Description |
|---|---|---|---|
| | early 17th century–1789 1814–1815 (Note: Briefly interrupted during the Hundred Days, during which the Empire was restored) 1815–1830 | Universal standard of the kings of France from the House of Bourbon | |
| | 1643–1715 | Royal standard of Louis XIV | |
| | 1715–1789 | Royal standard of Louis XV and Louis XVI | |
| | 1804–1814 1815 (Note: Briefly restored under the Hundred Days) | Imperial standard of Napoléon I | |
| | 1814–1815 1815–1830 | Royal standard of Louis XVIII and Charles X | |
| | 1830–1848 | Royal standard of Louis Philippe I | |
| | 1870–1873 | Imperial standard of Napoléon III | |
| | 1873–1879 | Imperial standard of Napoléon III | |
| | 1827–1877 | Personal standard of Pomare IV | |

== Military ==
Flags of the French Military

| Flag | Date | Use | Description |
|---|---|---|---|
| | | Flag of the Minister of the Armed Forces | A vertical tricolour of blue, white, and red (proportions 1:1) with a golden emblem. |
| | 10 August 1939–present | Flag of the Chief of the Defence Staff | Originally the marque of the Chief of the National Defence. |
| | 1916–present | Flag of the Marshal of France | |

=== Army ===
Flags of the French Army

| Flag | Date | Use | Description |
|---|---|---|---|
| | 10 August 1939–present | Flag of the Chief of Staff of the French Army | Marque given to the chief of staff. |
| | 1789–1793 | Flag of National Volunteers | |

=== Navy ===
Flags of the French Navy

| Flag | Date | Use | Description |
|---|---|---|---|
| | 10 August 1939–present | Flag of the Chief of Staff of the French Navy | Marque given to the chief of staff. |
| | 1794–1814; 1853–present | Naval ensign of France | A vertical tricolour of blue, white, and red, but with bars in proportion 30:33:37 |
| | 1848–1910 | Naval ensign of French Algeria | |
| | 16th century–? | Naval flag of the Kingdom of France | |
| | ?–1790 | Naval flag of the Kingdom of France (galley ensign) | |
| | 1790–1794 | Naval ensign of Kingdom of France and French First Republic | A white flag with a bordered, first version of the French tricolore on the top hoist honour quadrant |
| | 1638–1790; 1814–1815 1815–1830 | Naval ensign of Kingdom of France | A pure white flag |
| | 1943–1945 | Naval jack of Free France | The argent rhomboid field is defaced with a gules Lorraine cross. |
| | 10 August 1939–present | Flag of the Admiral of the French Navy | |
| | 10 August 1939–present | Flag of the Vice-Admiral D'escadre of the French Navy | |
| | | Flag of the Vice-Admiral of the French Navy | |
| | | Flag of the Contre-Admiral of the French Navy | |
| | | Flag of the Capitaine de Vaisseau of the French Navy (Division) | |
| | | Flag of the Capitaine de Vaisseau of the French Navy (Unit) | |
| | | Flag of the Harbour Commanding Officer | |
| | | Flag of the Senior Merchant Navy Captain in the harbour | |
| | | Pennant | |

=== Air Force ===
Flags of the French Air Force

| Flag | Date | Use | Description |
|---|---|---|---|
| | 10 August 1939–present | Flag of the Chief of Staff of the French Air Force | Marque given to the chief of staff. |
| | 1916–1917 | Flag of the Lafayette Escadrille | |

== Civil Ensign ==
| Flag | Date | Use | Description |
|---|---|---|---|
| | 17th century | Civil ensign of Kingdom of France | |
| | ?–1790 | Civil ensign of Kingdom of France | |
| | ?–1790 | Merchant ensign of Kingdom of France | |
| | 1923–1945; 1945–1949 | Civil and merchant ensign of French Indochina | |
| | | French pilot boat flag | |

== Vexillology Associations ==
| Flag | Date | Use | Description |
|---|---|---|---|
| | 2016–present | Flag of French Society of Vexillology | |
| | 1996–present | Flag of Breton Vexillological Society | |

== City flags ==
=== Largest cities ===
| Flag | Date | City | Description |
|---|---|---|---|
| | 1945–present | Paris | Main article: Flag of Paris In the center is the coat of arms of Paris. Red is identified with Saint Denis, blue with Saint Martin. |
| | 13th century–present | Marseille | Main article: Flag of Marseille The flag dates from the time of the Crusades. The cross is a symbol of the crusades. |
| | ?–present | Lyon | Main article: Flag of Lyon |
| | 14th century–present | Nice | Flag of the County of Nice (1108–1176) |
| | ?–present | Nantes | White cross of the Kingdom of France on the black cross of Brittany |
| | 1262–present | Strasbourg | Colors of Alsace |

== Political flags ==
| Flag | Date | Party | Description |
|---|---|---|---|
current
| | 2021–present | Reconquête | |
| | 2010–present | Europe Ecology – The Greens | |
| | 2009–present | Left Party | |
| Link to file | 1998–present | Guadeloupe Communist Party | |
| | 1983–present | French Nationalist Party | |
| | 1977–present | Tahoera'a Huiraatira | |
| | 1964–present | Breton Democratic Union | |
former
| | 1968–2013 | L'Œuvre Française | |
| | 1961–1962 | Organisation armée secrète | |
| | 1941–1945 | National Popular Rally | |
| | 1936–1945 | French Popular Party | |
| | 1934–1944 | French National-Collectivist Party | |
| | 1933–1944 | Mouvement Franciste | |
| | 1927–1939 | French Agrarian and Peasant Party | |
| | 1791–1792 | Feuillant | |
| | 1790–1795 | Cordeliers | |

=== Monarchist flags ===
These flags have a long tradition among French monarchists.

| Flag | Date | Use | Description |
|---|---|---|---|
| | | Legitimist royalist flag | White strewn with gold fleur-de-lis adorned with a Sacred Heart. |
| | | Flag of Cross of Burgundy. | |
| | | A proposed flag of France, possible design by Henri d'Artois, comte de Chambord. | |
| | | The royal banner of France or "Bourbon flag". | |
| | | Civil ensign of the Kingdom of France. | |
| | | Imperial standard of Napoléon III. | |
| | | Flag of Lyon, because of Revolt of Lyon against the National Convention. | |
| | | Royal standard of Louis XIV. | |
| | | Kroaz Du, sometimes it contains Sacred Hearts next to ermine spots | |

=== Separatist movements flags ===
| Flag | Date | Party | Description |
|---|---|---|---|
Brittany
| | 2001–present | Adsav | |
| | 1971–1980 | Breton Communist Party | |
| | 1931–1944 | Breton National Party | |
| | 1907 | Breton Regionalist Union | |
Occitania
| | 2018–present | Democratic Organization of the People of Occitania^{oc} | |
| | 1969–1976 | Anarchist-Communist Federation of Occitania | |
Catalonia
| | 1972–1981 | Catalan Workers' Left | |
Guadeloupe
| | 1978–present | People's Union for the Liberation of Guadeloupe | |
| | 1963–1970s | Guadeloupe National Organizing Group | |
Saint Martin
| | 1990–present | Pro-Unification of Saint Martin flag | |
Martinique
| | 1992–present | Build the Martinique Country and Movement of Democrats and Ecologists for Sovereign Martinique^{fr} | |
| Link to file | 1984–present | National Council of People's Committees^{fr} | |
| | 1984–present | Communist Party for Independence and Socialism | |
| | 1978–present | Martinican Independence Movement | |
New Caledonia
| | 1984–present | Kanak and Socialist National Liberation Front | |
| | 1953–present | Caledonian Union | |
French Polynesia
| | 1986–present | Tavini Huiraatira | |
French Guiana
| | 1991–present | Decolonization and Social Emancipation Movement | |
Pied-Noir
| | 2016–present | Etat Pied-Noir | |

== Ethnic groups flags ==
Many cultural groups, which identify themselves mostly by language, use traditional flag of the regions of its origin. Such flags are not listed here.

| Flag | Date | Use | Description |
|---|---|---|---|
| | 11th century–present | Flag of Alsatians | The flag of Alsace is a horizontal bicolour of red over white. |
| | ? | Cultural flag of Arpitania | Sun of the Alps |
| | 1894–present | Flag of Basques | Ikurriña |
| | 1923–present | Flag of Bretons | Flag of Brittany |
| | 1923–present | Flag of Catalans | Senyera serves as a flag of Pyrénées-Orientales |
| | 1188?–present | Flag of Gascon people | Flag of Gascony |
| | 13th century–present | Flag of Norman people | Flag and coat of arms of Normandy |
| | 19th century–present | Flag of Occitans | Occitan cross |
| | 1847–present | Flag of Savoyards | Duchy of Savoy#Flag |
| | ?–present | Flag of Yenish people | |
| | ?–present | Flag of Native Guyanese | |
| | 2010–present | Flag of Kanak people | Flags of New Caledonia |
| | 1837–present | Flag of Mangarevans | Flag of the Gambier Islands |
| | 1980–present | Flag of Marquesans | Flag of the Marquesas Islands |
| | 1788–present | Flag of Tahitians | Flag of French Polynesia |
| | 1985–present | Flag of Tuamotus | |
| | 1985–present | Flag of Tubuaians | Flag of the Austral Islands |
| | 1985–present | Flag of Uvea people | Flag of Wallis and Futuna |

== Historical flags ==
| Flag | Date | Use | Description |
|---|---|---|---|
| | 1790–1794 | Flag of Kingdom of France and French First Republic | |
| | 14 July 1790 | Revolutionist flag | Similar to the flag of Bohemia and Moravia |
| | 21 January 1793 | Revolutionist flag | Similar to the flag of the Netherlands. |
| | 7 May 1794 | Revolutionist flag | Similar to the flag of pre-Communist Yugoslavia. |
| | 1814–1815 1815–1830 | Royal flag of Kingdom of France | |
| | 1848 | Flag of French Second Republic | |
| | 1940–1944 | Flag of Free France | |
| | 1943–1944 | Flag of the Milice | |

=== Kingdom of France ===
| Flag | Date | Use | Description |
|---|---|---|---|
| | 10th century–12th century | Banner of the Kingdom of France | |
| | 12th century–13th century | Banner of the Kingdom of France | |
| | 14th century–16th century | Banner of the Kingdom of France | |
| | 1365–1792; 1814–1815 1815–1830 | Flag of the Kingdom of France & the Bourbon Restoration | |
| | 1791–1814 | Flag of Armée des Émigrés | |
| | 1793–1800 | Type of Catholic and Royal Army of Vendée flag | |
| | 1715–1789 | State flag of the Kingdom of France under the absolute monarchy. | |
| | 1365–1794 | The royal banner of early modern France or "Bourbon flag" was the most commonly used flag in New France. | |
| | 1124–1356 | Oriflamme | |
| | 9th century | Oriflamme | |

=== Alsace ===
| Flag | Date | Use | Description |
|---|---|---|---|
| | Adopted 11th century | Historical flag of Alsace | |
| | 1918 | Flag of Alsace-Lorraine Soviet Republic | |
| | 1912–1918 | Flag of Imperial Territory of Alsace-Lorraine | |
| | 1871–1918 | Flag of Imperial Territory of Alsace-Lorraine | |
| | 982–1803 | Banner of the Prince-Bishopric of Strasbourg | |

=== Brittany ===
| Flag | Date | Use | Description |
|---|---|---|---|
| | 939–1547 | Flag of Duchy of Brittany | |
| | 939–1547 | Duchy of Brittany – Kroaz Du | |
| | 14th century–16th century | Breton Army Flag and Ensign | |
| | 1351 | Brittany banner during the Breton Civil War | |

=== Burgundy ===
| Flag | Date | Use | Description |
|---|---|---|---|
| | 918–1482 | Flag of Duchy of Burgundy | |
| | 14th century | Flag of Cross of Burgundy | |

=== Corsica ===
| Flag | Date | Use | Description |
|---|---|---|---|
| | 14th century | Flag of Corsica | |
| | ?–1755 | Flag of Corsica | |
| | 1794–1796 | Flag of the Anglo-Corsican Kingdom | |

=== Normandy ===
| Flag | Date | Use | Description |
|---|---|---|---|
| | 911–1469 | Flag of Duchy of Normandy | |
| | 1035–1087 | William the Conquerors gonfalon | William the Conquerors personal gonfalon held by Eustace II, Count of Boulogne in the Bayeux Tapestry. |

=== Occitania ===
| Flag | Date | Use | Description |
|---|---|---|---|
| | Medieval | Flag of County of Foix | |
| | 9th century–1620 | Flag of Viscounty of Béarn | |
| | 602–1453 | Flag of Duchy of Aquitaine | |
| | 778–1271 | Flag of County of Toulouse | |
| | 1108–1176 | Flag of County of Nice | |
| | 1274–1791 | Flag of Comtat Venaissin | |
| | 1848–1849 | Flag of the Free Cities of Menton and Roquebrune | |
| | 1944 | Flag of Free Republic of Vercors | |

=== Savoy ===
| Flag | Date | Use | Description |
|---|---|---|---|
| | 1147–1847 | Flag of Duchy of Savoy | |

=== French Guiana ===
| Flag | Date | Use | Description |
|---|---|---|---|
| | 2010–2015 | Flag of the Territorial Collectivity of French Guiana | |
| | Colonial | Unofficial French Guiana | Banner of arms of French Guiana. |

=== French Polynesia ===
==== Austral Islands ====
| Flag | Date | Use | Description |
|---|---|---|---|
| | 1858–1889 | Flag of Kingdom of Rurutu | |
| | 1889–1900 | Flag of Kingdom of Rurutu | |
| | 1856–1891 | Flag of Kingdom of Rimatara | |
| | 1891–1900 | Flag of Kingdom of Rimatara | |

==== Gambier Islands ====
| Flag | Date | Use | Description |
|---|---|---|---|
| | 1832–1843 | Flag of Kingdom of Mangareva | |

==== Marquesas Islands ====
| Flag | Date | Use | Description |
|---|---|---|---|
| | 1837–1842 | Flag of Kingdom of Tahuata | |
| | 1835 | Flag of Kingdom of Taiohae | |

==== Society Islands ====
| Flag | Date | Use | Description |
|---|---|---|---|
| | 1820–1845 | Flag of Kingdom of Bora Bora | |
| | 1837–1842 | Flag of Kingdom of Bora Bora | |
| | 1842–1895 | Flag of Kingdom of Bora Bora | |
| | 1847–1888 | Flag of Kingdom of Huahine | |
| | 1847–1880 | Flag of Kingdom of Raiatea | |
| | 1880–1888 | Flag of Kingdom of Raiatea | |
| | 1822–1829 | Flag of Kingdom of Tahiti | |
| | 1829–1843 | Flag of Kingdom of Tahiti | |
| | 1843–1880 | Flag of Tahiti Protectorate | |

==== Tuamotus ====
| Flag | Date | Use | Description |
|---|---|---|---|
| | 1832–1843 | Flag of Tuamotu Kingdom | |

=== Martinique ===
| Flag | Date | Use | Description |
|---|---|---|---|
| | 1766–2018 | Unofficial flag of Martinique | |
| | 2019–2021 | Flag of the Territorial Collectivity of Martinique | |
| | Since 2023 | Official flag of Martinique | |

=== Wallis and Futuna ===
| Flag | Date | Use | Description |
|---|---|---|---|
| | 1842–1860 | Flag of the Kingdom of Uvea | |
| | 1860–1886 | Flag of the Kingdom of Uvea | |
| | 1886–1887 | Flag of the Kingdom of Uvea | |
| | 1837–1858 | Royal standard of Uvea | |
| | 1858–1887 | Royal standard of Uvea | |
| | 1887–1910 | Unofficial flag of Wallis and Futuna | |
| | 1910–1976 | Unofficial flag of Wallis and Futuna | |
| | 1976–1985 | Unofficial flag of Wallis and Futuna | |
| | 1985–2020 | Unofficial flag of Wallis and Futuna | |

=== Other historical flags ===
| Flag | Date | Use | Description |
|---|---|---|---|
| | 1419 | Flag of Dauphin Charles (future Charles VII) upon his entry (adventus) into Bourges on 14 March 1419. According to Anselme d'Ysalguier (from Toulouse) eyewitness. | |
| | c. 1569 | | |
| | c. 1590 | Flag of the Catholic League | |
| | 1870 | Banner of the Catholic French Papal Zouaves | |
| | 1871 | Revolutionary banner from the Paris Commune | A plain red flag |

== Flag proposal ==
| Flag | Date | Use | Description |
|---|---|---|---|
| | 1871 | A proposed flag of France, possible design by Henri d'Artois, comte de Chambord. | |
| | ca. 2010 | Proposal by Hervé, Baron Pinoteau for the flag of a restored Kingdom of France under legitimist Bourbon branch. | |

== Associations ==
| Flag | Date | Use | Description |
|---|---|---|---|
| | ?–present? | Human Rights League | |
| | 1967– | Société Nationale de Sauvetage en Mer | |
| | 1896–1935 | French Society of Sea Works | |

== French shipping company ==
| Flag | Date | Use | Description |
|---|---|---|---|
| | 1976–2016 | Société nationale maritime Corse Méditerranée | |
| | 1912–1962 | Compagnie de Navigation Sud-Atlantique | |
| | 1903–1988 | Caen Naval Company^{fr} | |
| | 1883–1990 | Compagnie Générale Transatlantique | |
| | 1881–1933 | Fabre Line | They used the flag of Marseille. |
| | 1872–? | Chargeurs | |
| | 1851–1977 | Messageries Maritimes | |
| | 1836–1979 | Compagnie Fraissinet | |
| | 1664–1794 | French East India Company | |

== French yacht clubs ==
| Flag | Club |
|---|---|
| | Cercle de la voile de Paris |
| | Cercle de la Voile d'Arcachon |
| | Société des Régates Rochelaises |
| | Société nautique de Marseille |
| | Union Nationale pour la Course au Large |
| | Yacht Club de France (Burgee) |
| | Yacht Club de France (Ensign) |
| | Société des Régates du Havre |
| | Cercle nautique La Baule Le Pouliguen Pornichet |

== See also ==
- List of Breton flags
- List of Corsican flags
- List of flags of Île-de-France
- List of Occitan flags
- List of flags of Pays de la Loire
