= List of Breton flags =

This is a list of flags that are used exclusively in the traditional cultural region of Brittany, including the modern administrative region of the same name as well as the Loire-Atlantique department. Other flags used in Brittany, as well as the rest of France can be found at list of French flags.

== Regional flags ==
Flag	Date	Use	Description
	1923	Flag of Brittany^{reg}	Nine horizontal stripes alternating black and white with an ermine canton (sable, four bars argent, a canton ermine).
	2005	Logo variant of the flag of Brittany	Logo on a white background.

== City and town flags ==
Flag	Date	Use	Description
		Flag of Bégard	
		Flag of Belle-Île-en-Mer	
		Flag of Binic	
		Flag of Bréhand	
		Flag of Brest	
		Flag of Châteaugiron	
		Flag of Châteauneuf-du-Faou	
Combourg		Flag of Combourg	
		Flag of Concarneau	
		Flag of Dinan	
	1905–1998, 2014–present	Flag of Dinard	
	1998–2014	Flag of Dinard	
	1988–present	Flag of Dol-de-Bretagne	
		Flag of Donges	
		Flag of Étables-sur-Mer	
		Flag of Évran	
		Flag of Fouesnant	
		Flag of Fougères	
		Flag of Guérande	
		Flag of Guerlesquin	
		Flag of Guingamp	
		Flag of Hillion	
		Flag of Hœdic	
		Flag of Huelgoat	
		Flag of Île de Batz	
		Flag of Île de Sein	
	2025–present	Flag of Indre	
	2002–present	Flag of Kerlouan	
		Flag of La Forest-Landerneau	
		Flag of Landerneau	
		Flag of Landivisiau	
		Flag of Lannion	
	1999–present	Flag of Le Juch	
		Flag of Lorient	
		Flag of Merdrignac	
		Flag of Mordelles	
		Flag of Mûr-de-Bretagne	
		Flag of Nantes	
		Flag of Nort-sur-Erdre	
		Flag of Paimpol	
		Flag of Plancoët	
		Flag of Plédran	
		Flag of Plérin	
		Flag of Plomelin	
		Flag of Pont-l'Abbé	
		Flag of Pontrieux	
		Flag of Port-Louis	
		Flag of Pouldergat	
		Flag of Redon	
		Flag of Rennes	
		Flag of Rezé	
		Flag of Rostrenen	
		Flag of Saint-Brieuc	
		Flag of Saint-Malo	
		Flag of Saint-Nazaire	
		Flag of Saint-Pol-de-Léon	
		Flag of Saint-Quay-Portrieux	
		Flag of Tréveneuc	
		Flag of Ushant	
		Flag of Vannes	
		Flag of Yffiniac	

== Traditional regions ==
Flag	Date	Use	Description
	1996–present	Flag of Cornouaille	A white ram on a blue field.
	1996–present	Flag of Léon	A black lion rampant on an orange field.
	1996–present	Flag of Pays de Dol	A white-and-red quartered field with three black ermine spots in each of the white quarters.
	1996–present	Flag of Pays de Dol	A simplified version of the flag without the ermine spots.
		Flag of Pays Nantais	
		Flag of Pays Rennais	
		Flag of Pays de Saint-Brieuc	
	2006–present	Flag of Pays de Saint-Malo	A black cross outlined in gold, with red fields in the first and fourth quarters, and white fields containing three black ermine spots each in the second and third quarters.
	1996–2006	Flag of Pays de Saint-Malo	
	1998–present	Flag of Trégor	A black cross overlaid with a red wyvern, on an orange field.
	1996–1998	Flag of Trégor	A black cross on a yellow field, with a black alerion in each quarter.
		Flag of Vannetais	

== Traditional districts ==
Flag	Date	Use	Description
		Flag of Pays d'Ancenis	
		Flag of Pays de l'Aven	
		Flag of Pays de Baud	
		Flag of Belle-Île-en-Mer	
		Flag of Pays Bidar	
	1996–present	Flag of Pays Bigouden	
		Flag of Pays de Calanhel	
		Flag of Cap Sizun	
		Flag of Chtou	
		Flag of Clos Poulet	
		Flag of Clos Ratel	
		Flag of Coglais	
		Flag of Dardoup	
		Flag of Pays Fañch	
		Flag of Fisel	
		Flag of Pays Fouesnantais	
		Flag of Pays Glazik	
	2009–present	Flag of Goëlo	
		Flag of Pays de Guérande	
		Flag of Pays Guerchais	
		Flag of Kernevodez	
		Flag of Kost ar C'hoed	
		Flag of Bas-Léon	
		Flag of Haut-Léon	
		Flag of Pays de Lorient	
		Flag of Pays de Loudéac	
		Flag of Pays de la Mée	
		Flag of Pays Mitaud	
		Flag of Pays Pagan	
		Flag of Penn Sardin	
		Flag of Penthièvre	
		Flag of Plinn	
		Flag of Plougastel	
	1997–present	Flag of Poher	
		Flag of Pays de Pontivy	
		Flag of Porhoët	
		Flag of Poudouvre	
		Flag of Pays Pourlet	
		Flag of Presqu'île de Crozon	
		Flag of Presqu'île de Rhuys	
		Flag of Pays de Redon	
		Flag of Pays de Retz	
		Flag of Pays Rouzig	
		Flag of Vannetais Oriental	
		Flag of Vendelais	
		Flag of Vignoble Nantais	

== Landforms ==
Flag	Date	Use	Description
		Flag of Brière	

== Landmarks ==
Flag	Date	Use	Description
		Flag flown at the Château de Clisson	A pennant divided into two horizontal stripes of red and yellow.
		Flag flown at the Château de Josselin	A banner of arms of the House of Rohan-Chabot.
		Flag flown at the Château de Tonquédec	
		Flag flown at the Fort-la-Latte	A banner of arms of the House of Goyon de Matignon.

== Political flags ==
Flag	Date	Use	Description
	2005–present	Flag of Ai'ta!	
	2001–present	Flag of Adsav	
	2013	Flag of the Bonnets Rouges	A red field divided by a white saltire, with a red disk in the centre of the saltire and four white ermine spots sticking out of the disk, arranged like a compass rose.
		Flag of the Breton Association of the Pays de Fougères	
	1971–1980	Flag of the Breton Communist Party	
	1964–	Flag of the Breton Democratic Union	
	1931–1944	Flag of the Breton National Party	
	1907	Flag of the Breton Regionalist Union	
	1996–present	Flag of the Breton Vexillological Society	
	1970s	Flag of Strollad ar Vro	A blue ermine spot in a white disk on a blue field.

== Association flags ==
Flag	Date	Use	Description
	2007–present	Flag of Association of Breton Nobility	

== Scouting flags ==
Flag	Date	Use	Description
	1946-1962	Flag of Bleimor	
	1943-?	Flag of Urz Goanag Breiz	

== Religious flags ==
Flag	Date	Use	Description
		Flag of Saint Ivo	A black engrailed cross on an orange field, with a black alerion in each quarter.
		Flag of the Sovereign Order of St. John of Jerusalem, Knights Hospitaller - Priory of Brittany	

== Historical flags ==
Flag	Date	Use	Description
	5th–11th Century	Red Dragon Banner	
	13th–16th Century	Kroaz Du	
	13th–14th Century	Breton Army flag and ensign	
	14th–16th Century	Breton Army flag and ensign	
	1532–1547	Flag of the Duchy of Brittany	
	1651–1740	Flag of the Brittany Regiment	

== See also ==
- List of flags of Pays de la Loire
- List of French flags

== Notes ==
- ^reg Registered at the French Society of Vexillology.
