= List of communal flags in France =

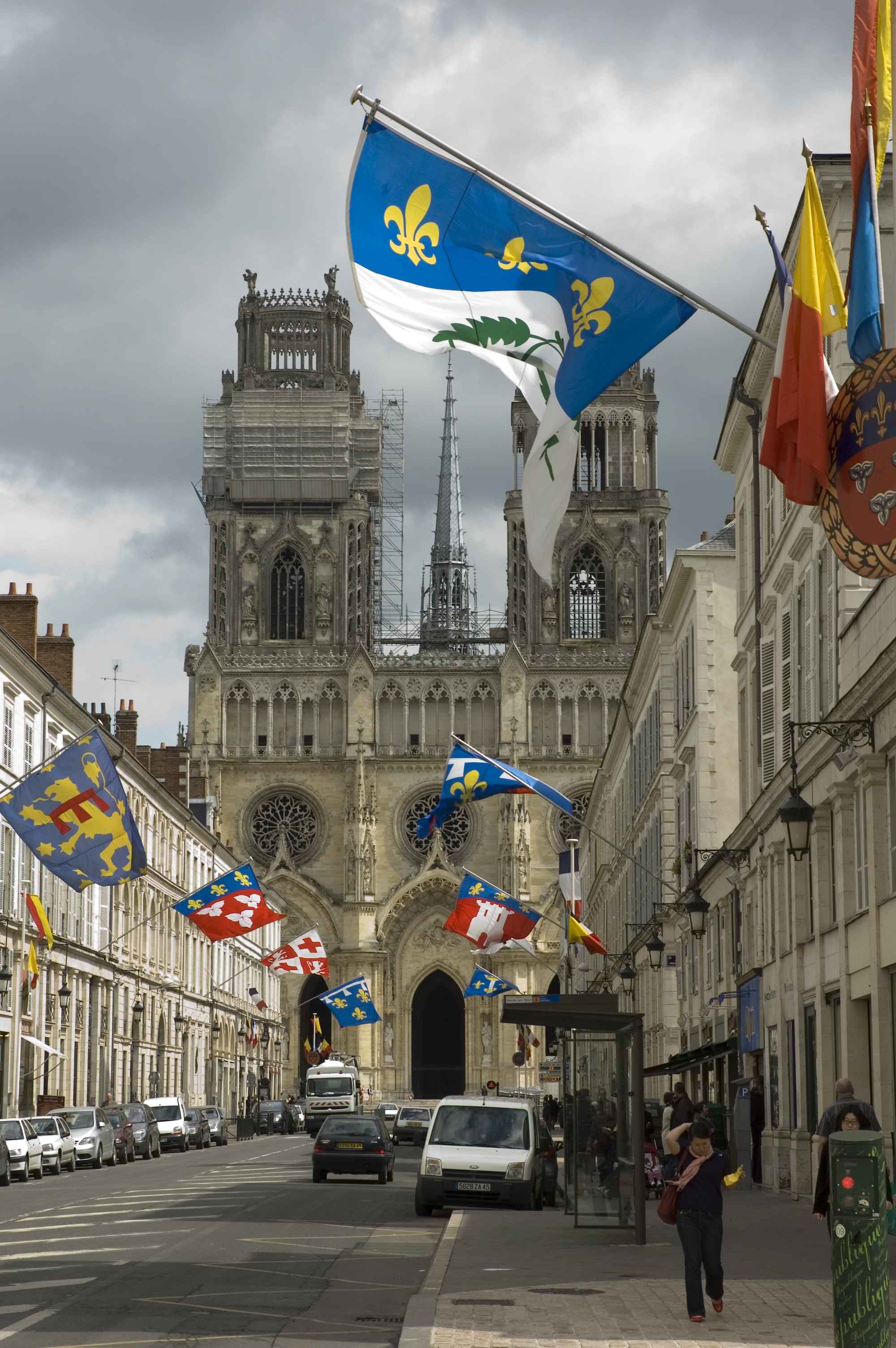
Jeanne d'Arc street (Orléans) were different regional and communal flags are hung

This is a list of communal flags in France. Communal flags are rarely used in France as communes usually favor coats of arms. As a result, the info presented in this list also describes coats of arms. Please note that some flags are presented are cultural flags.

== Metropolitan regions ==
=== Auvergne-Rhône-Alpes ===
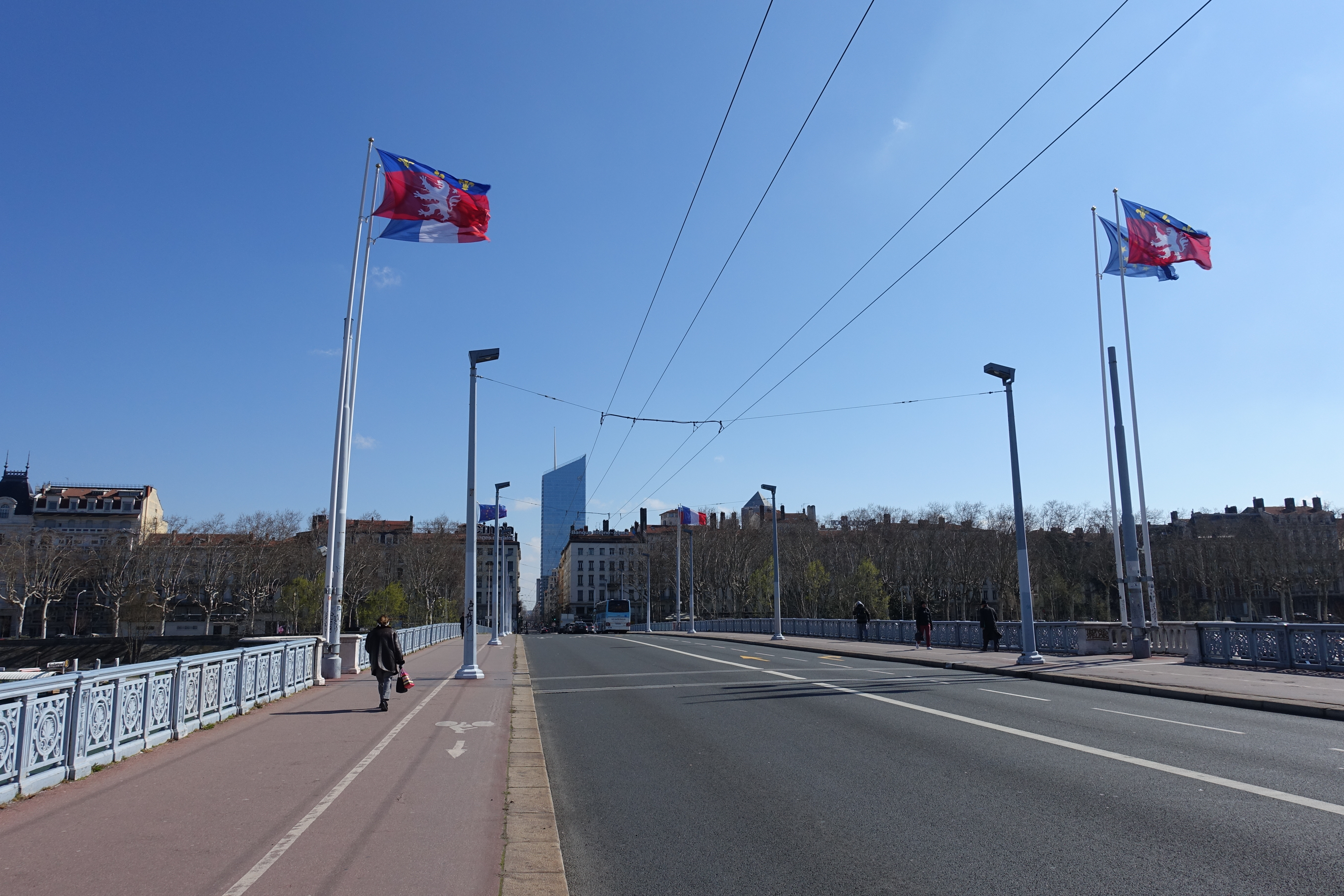
Lyon flag at Pont Lafayette bridge

Flag	Commune	Date	Description
	Annecy, Haute-Savoie		The flag has a red background with a white cross in the foreground. A white fish from the municipal coat of arms is placed in the canton.
	Arbent, Ain		
	Annemasse, Haute-Savoie		The flag has a vertical bicolour of blue at the left and yellow at the right.
	Bourg-en-Bresse, Ain		Banner of arms.
	Clermont-Ferrand, Puy-de-Dôme		Banner of arms.
	Cluses, Haute-Savoie		Banner of arms.
	Étrembières, Haute-Savoie		The flag has a vertical bicolour of green at the left and yellow at the right.
	Grenoble, Isère		The flag has a vertical bicolour of red at the left and yellow at the right.
	Le Puy-en-Velay, Haute-Loire		The flag has a vertical bicolour of yellow at the left and blue at the right.
	Lyon, Metropolis of Lyon	1320	Main article: Flag of Lyon A field of gules (red color), in which a lion appears rampant (of profile and erect) and of silver (white color). In chief, azure with three fleurs-de-lis Or (A blue division occupying the upper third (this is the "Head of France", granted to all "Bonnes Villes", which shows the heraldry of his former monarchs) with three stylised lily flowers); The flag was already used on city seals in the Middle Ages and was given to the city as a symbol by Philip V in 1320 after its liberation.
	Montluçon, Allier		The flag has a vertical bicolour of yellow at the left and blue at the right.
	Montmélian, Savoie		
	Pérouges, Ain		Banner of arms.
	Polignac, Haute-Loire		The flag consists of six horizontal stripes in the colours white and red.
	Saint-Étienne, Loire		The flag shows the municipal coat of arms on a white field.
	Versonnex, Ain		Banner of arms.

=== Bourgogne-Franche-Comté ===
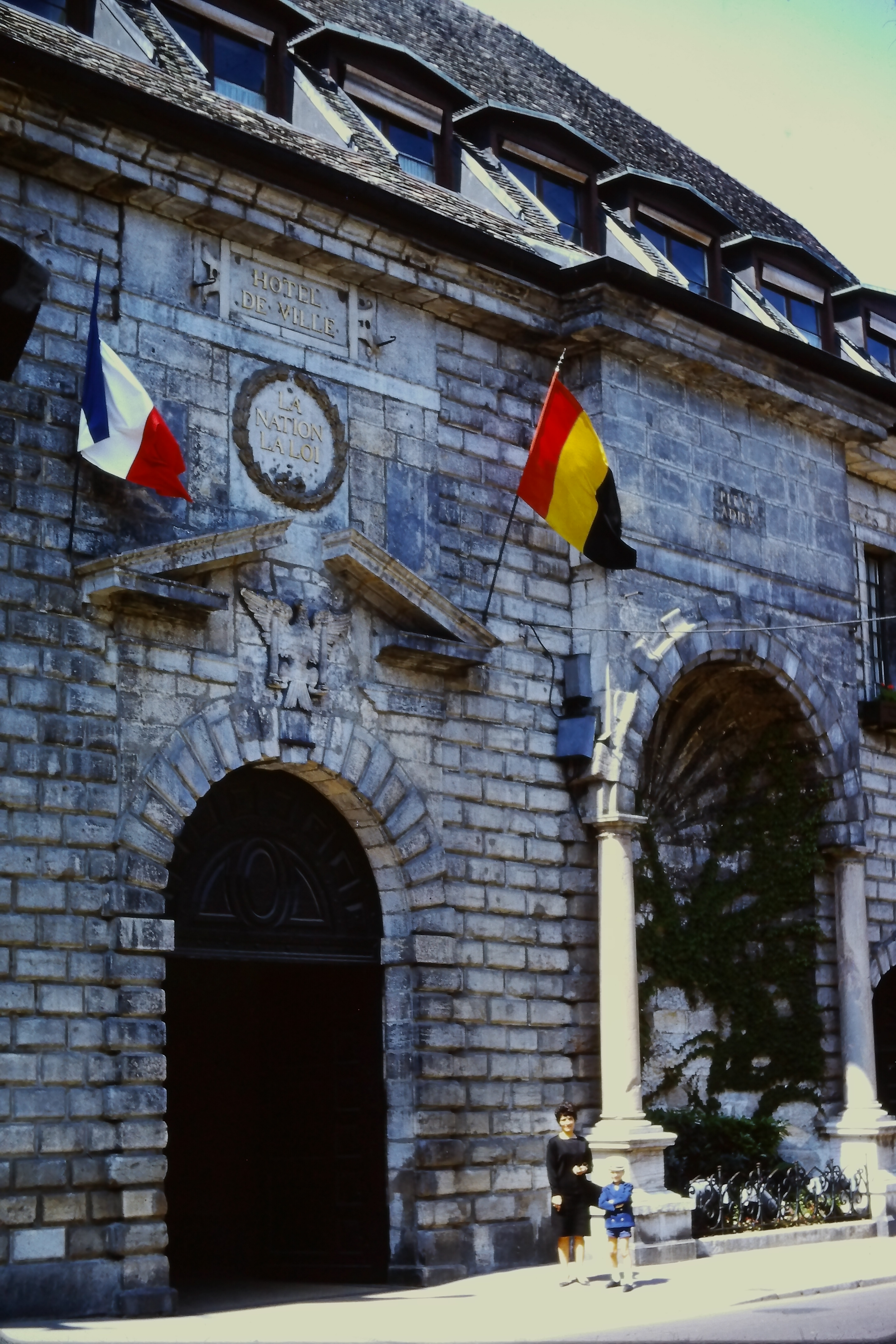
Former flag of Besançon at the City Hall of Besançon, taken in 1966

Flag	Commune	Date	Description
	Arbois, Jura		The flag has a vertical bicolour of black at the left and yellow at the right.
	Arc-sous-Cicon, Doubs		The flag has a horizontal tricolour of yellow, black and yellow.
	Besançon, Doubs	1537	The eagle represents the House of Habsburg and the Holy Roman Empire. Two pillars represents the city's connection to Gibraltar and its relation to the Greco-Roman world. The colours of the former flag are derived from the municipal coat of arms, similar to the Belgian flag.
	Dijon, Côte-d'Or	1391	Gules a chief per pale azure semy de lis or a bordure gobonny argent and gules and bendy of six or and azure a bordure gules.
	Montbéliard, Doubs		The flag is a horizontal bicolour consisting of a red stripe on top and a yellow stripe on bottom. The colours are derived from the corresponding coat of arms of the County of Montbéliard. In this, red was used as the background colour of the coat of arms and yellow for the two fish that are jumping up in opposite directions.
	Ornans, Doubs		The flag has a vertical tricolour of blue, red and yellow. The three colours are taken from the municipal coat of arms.

=== Brittany ===
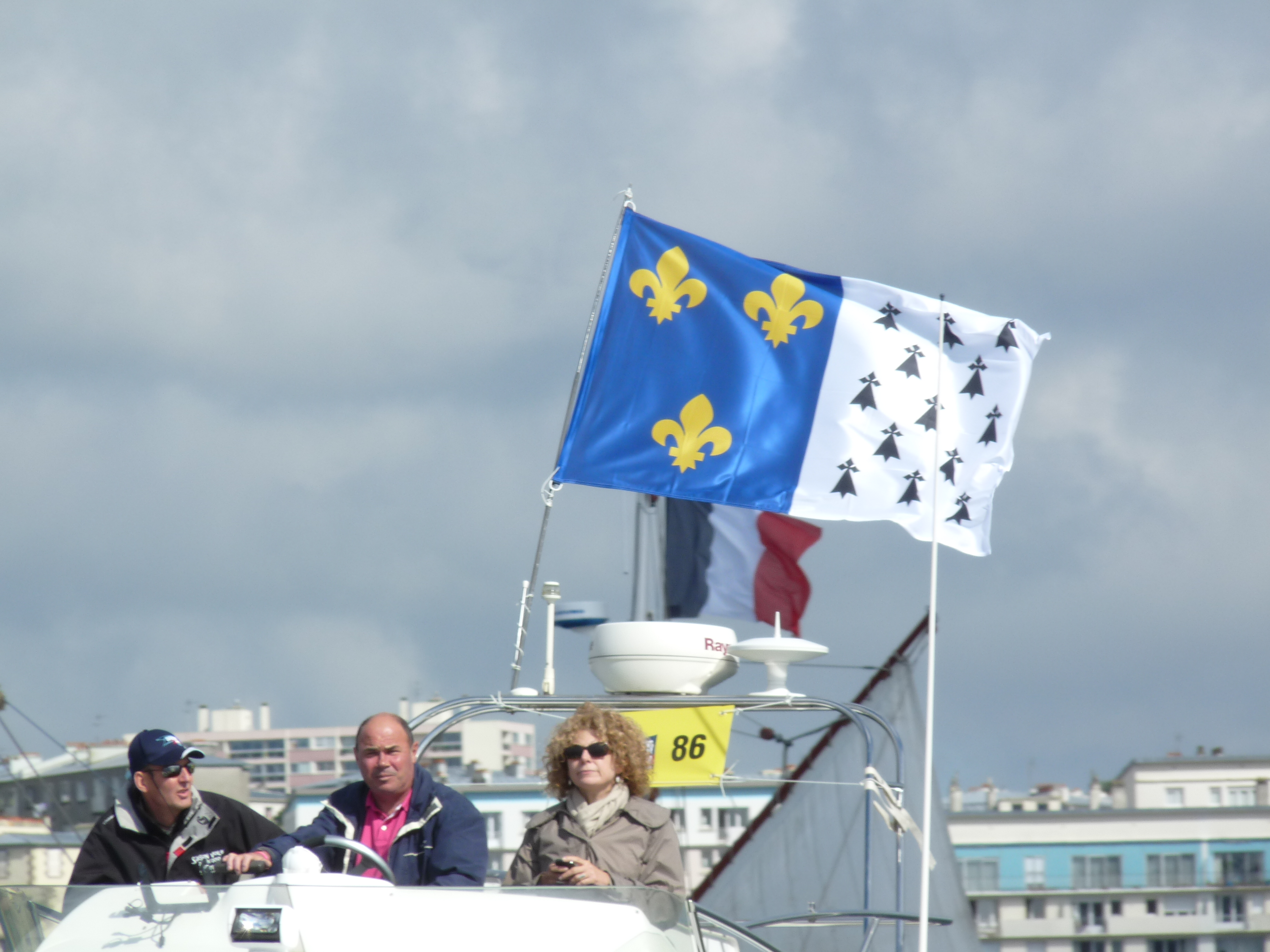
Brest flag on a boat.

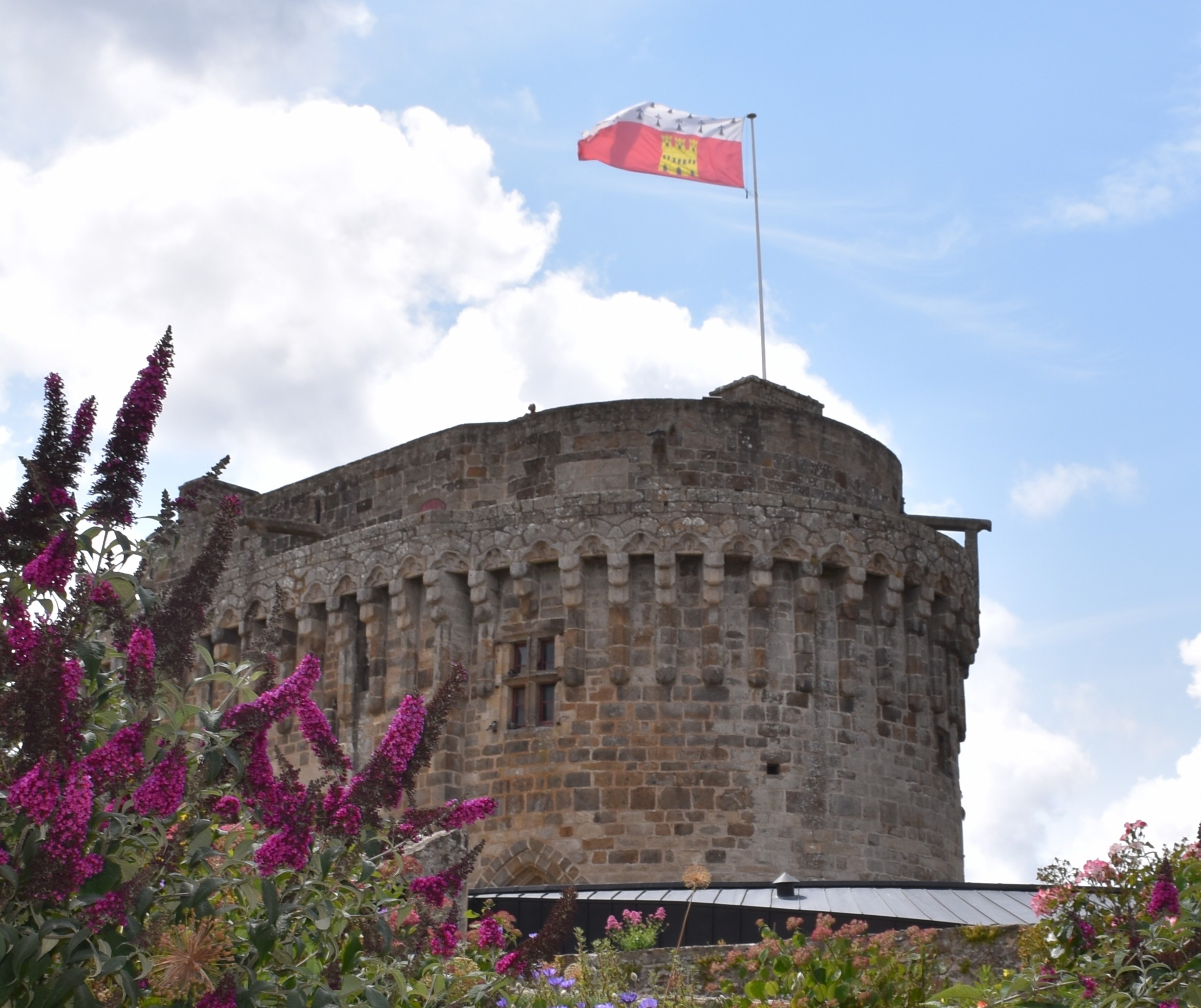
Dinan flag on top of the Château de Dinan.

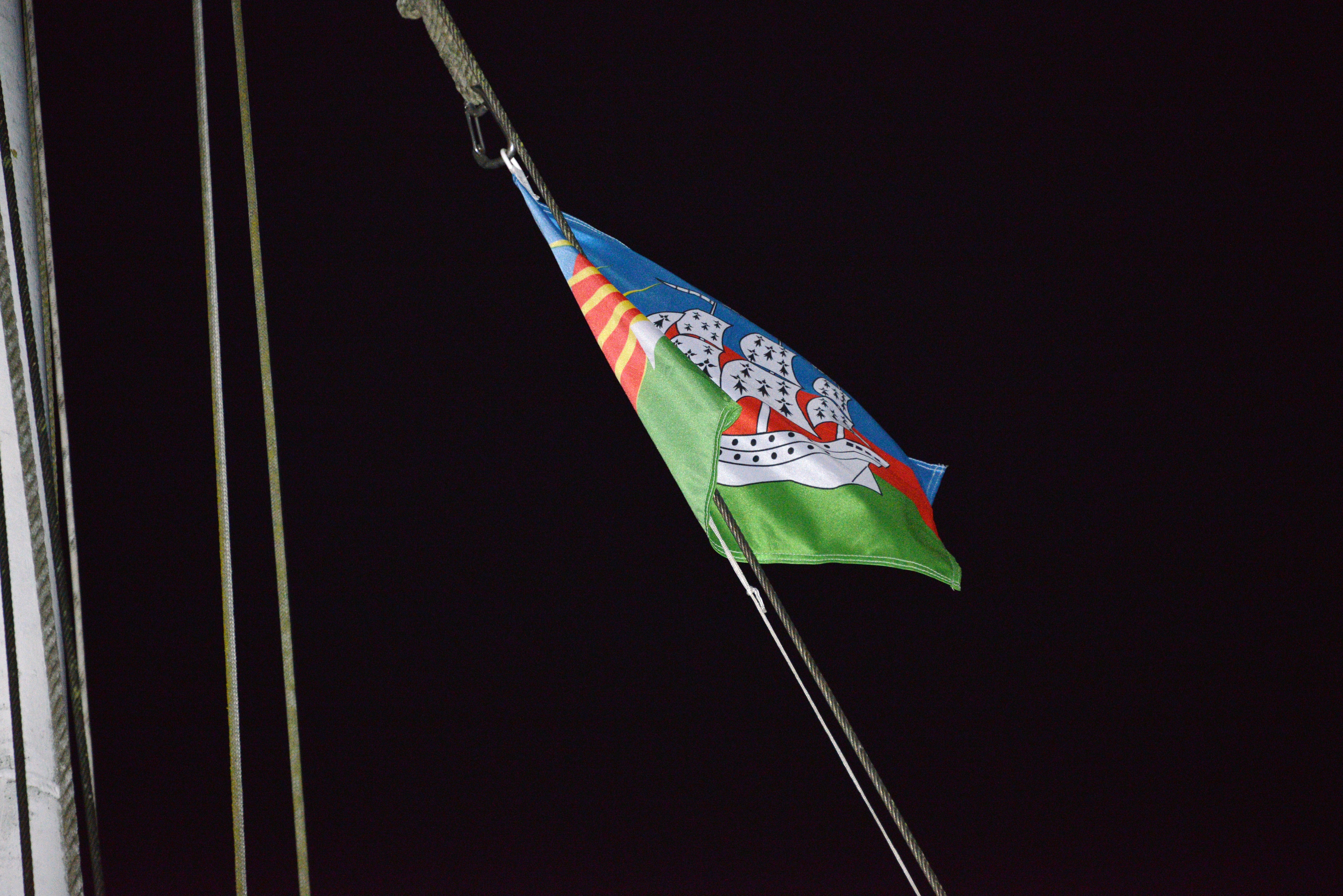
Lorient flag on the sailboat l'Hermine

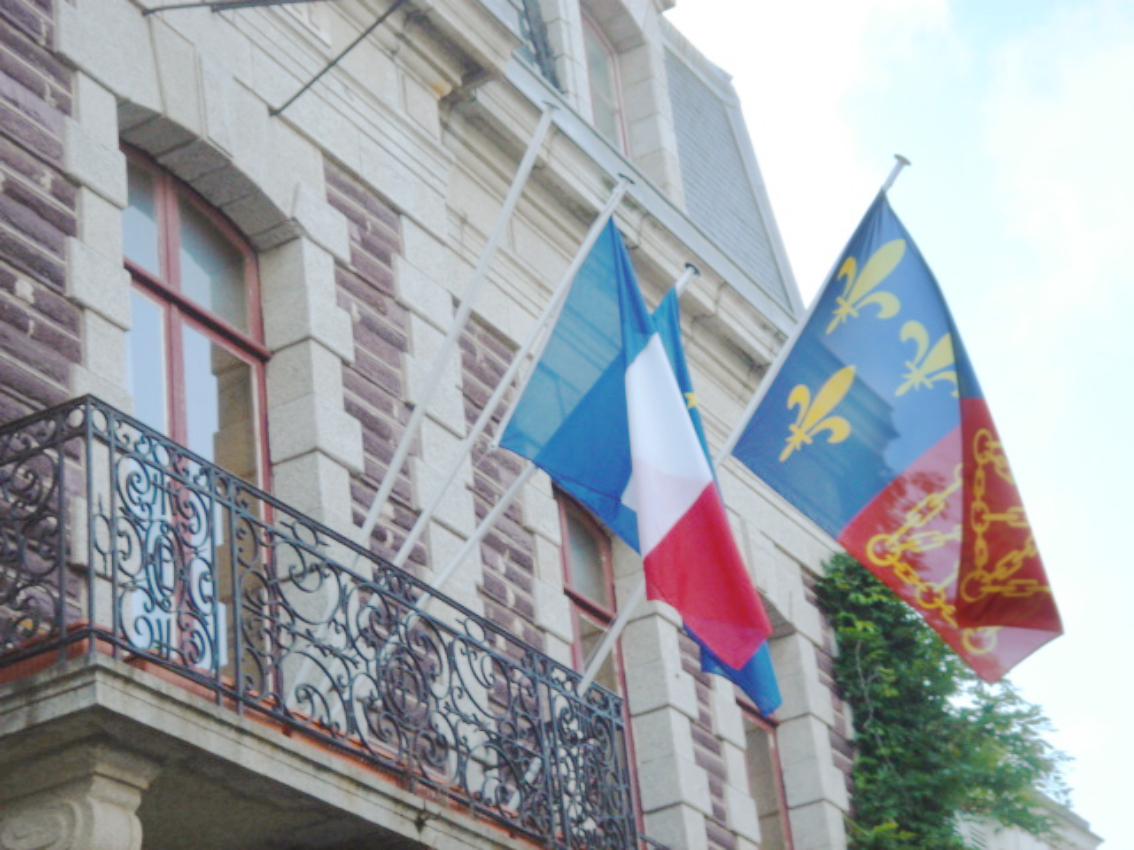
Flags of Le Palais, France and Europe on the front of the mayor's office.

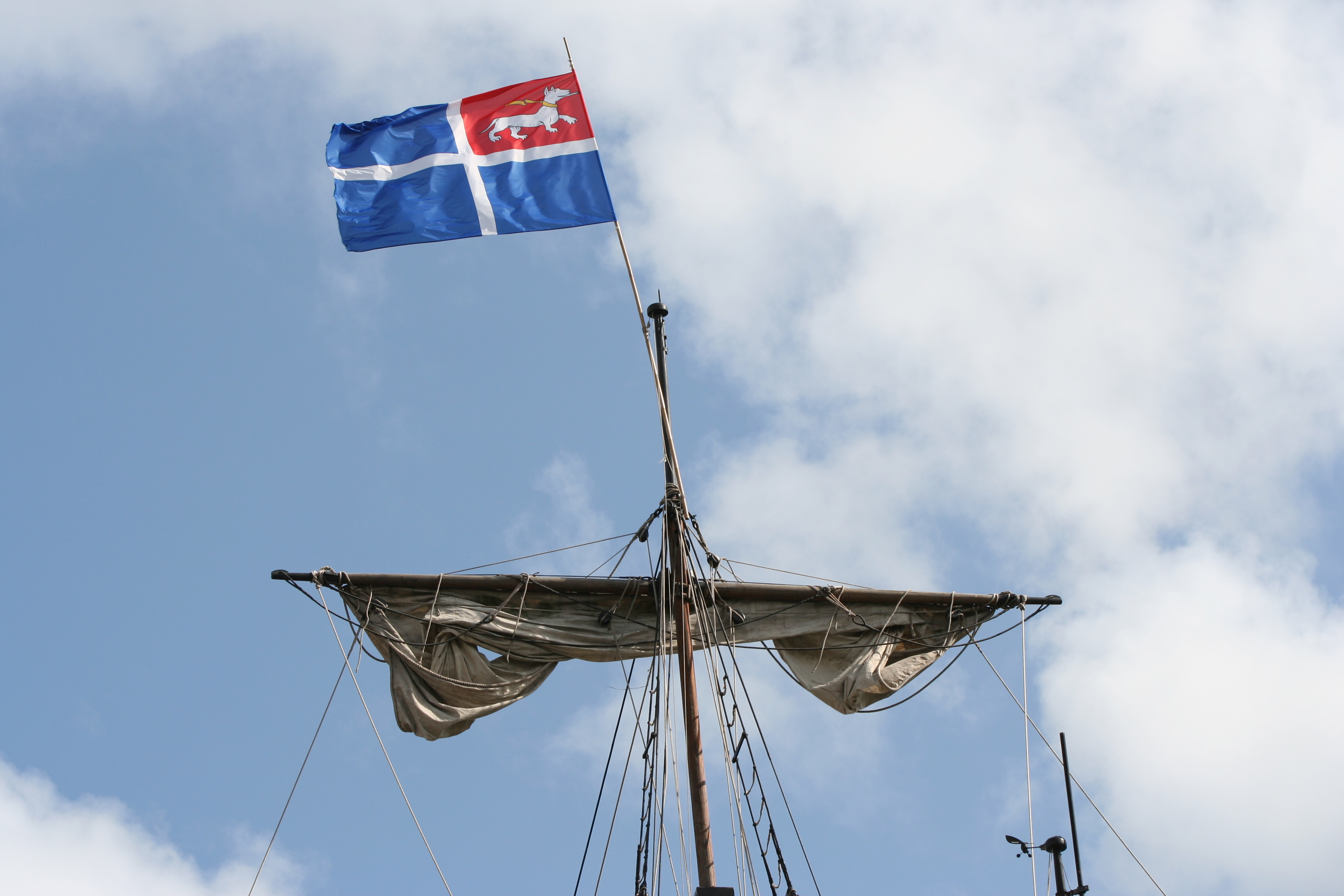
Saint-Malo flag on the Étoile du Roy.

Flag	Commune	Date	Description
	Bréhand, Côtes-d'Armor		Banner of arms.
	Brest, Finistère	15 July 1683	The heraldic flag of Brest: the most commonly used flag in Brest today.
	Brest, Finistère	18th century	Flag of Brest used in the 18th century.
	Brest, Finistère	16th century	Flag of Brest used in the 16th century.
	Brest, Finistère	15th century	Flag of Brest used in the 15th century.
	Cesson-Sévigné, Ille-et-Vilaine		The flag shows the municipal coat of arms on a white field.
	Châteaugiron, Ille-et-Vilaine		Banner of arms.
	Concarneau, Finistère		Banner of arms.
	Dinan, Côtes-d'Armor		Banner of arms.
	Dinard, Ille-et-Vilaine	1998	Created in 1997 by the Société bretonne de Vexillologie, as a reminder that the town's toponymy and history are linked to the legend of the Arthurian Romance.
	Dol-de-Bretagne, Ille-et-Vilaine		
	Fougères, Ille-et-Vilaine		
	Guerlesquin, Finistère		The flag has a vertical tricolour of yellow, red and yellow. The three colours are taken from the municipal coat of arms.
	Guingamp, Côtes-d'Armor		Banner of arms. The flag consists of four horizontal stripes in the colours white and blue.
	Hillion, Côtes-d'Armor		Banner of arms.
	Landerneau, Finistère		Banner of arms.
	Landivisiau, Finistère		
	Lannion, Côtes-d'Armor		Banner of arms.
	Le Juch, Finistère	1999	
	Lorient, Morbihan		From this coat of arms was developed a flag used by the Bagad Sonerien An Oriant, among others.
	Mordelles, Ille-et-Vilaine		
	Le Palais, Morbihan		
	Plédran, Côtes-d'Armor		Banner of arms.
	Plérin, Côtes-d'Armor		Banner of arms.
	Ploeren, Morbihan		
	Ploërmel, Morbihan		Banner of arms.
	Port-Louis, Morbihan		Banner of arms.
	Rennes, Ille-et-Vilaine		The earliest known mention of the flag of Rennes (early 16th century) shows the municipal shield (played argent and sable of six pieces, on a chief argent three ermine spots sable) on a bistre yellow background. More recently, various variants have been used, both by the municipality and by other organizations in Rennes. The drawing opposite is the most common. Some believe that Morvan Marchal drew inspiration from it to create the flag of Brittany. Another design is used by the Bleuñ-Brug of Finistère and seems to have come from the mark of the Cercle Celtique de Rennes. A version featuring the tilted shield has been adopted by the Vern-sur-Seiche bagad. A white flag sown with black ermines, with the city's coat of arms in the center, was used on the Rennes City Hall in contemporary times.
	Rostrenen, Côtes-d'Armor		Banner of arms.
	Saint-Brieuc, Côtes-d'Armor		Banner of arms.
	Saint-Malo, Ille-et-Vilaine		Saint-Malo's current flag is a blue flag with a white cross (the emblem of war ports under Louis XIV) and a gules franc quartier charged with a white ermine on a gold portcullis. Known as the "corsair flag", this is the flag of ships registered at the Saint-Malo Admiralty (and not the flag of Malouin privateers). In existence since the 18th century, privateers were only required to fly the following flags in the event of an attack: King's flag under the Ancien Régime, or the national tricolor flag from the Revolution onwards.
	Saint-Pol-de-Léon, Finistère		Banner of arms. On the first, the lion is that of Léon bearing the bishop's crozier (crosse épiscopale de gueules). The lion refers to the name of Léon, Leo, and the crosier recalls that the town was, before the Revolution, the seat of the bishopric of Léon (now attached to the bishopric of Quimper). It's a lion with horns (no claws, tongue or teeth). The second features the escutcheon of a defended boar (white tusks) with a gold crown around its neck, holding a red tower with three turrets, on a background of Breton ermines.
	Ushant, Finistère		Banner of arms.
	Vannes, Morbihan	20th century	Banner of arms. There is a notable difference between the coat of arms and the flag: the ermine on the flag is curled and adorned with the floating garter of Brittany, whereas the ermine on the coat of arms is tied with ermine doubled in gold. The red background symbolizes Bro Gwened, whose capital was Vannes.
	Yffiniac, Côtes-d'Armor		Banner of arms.

=== Centre-Val de Loire ===
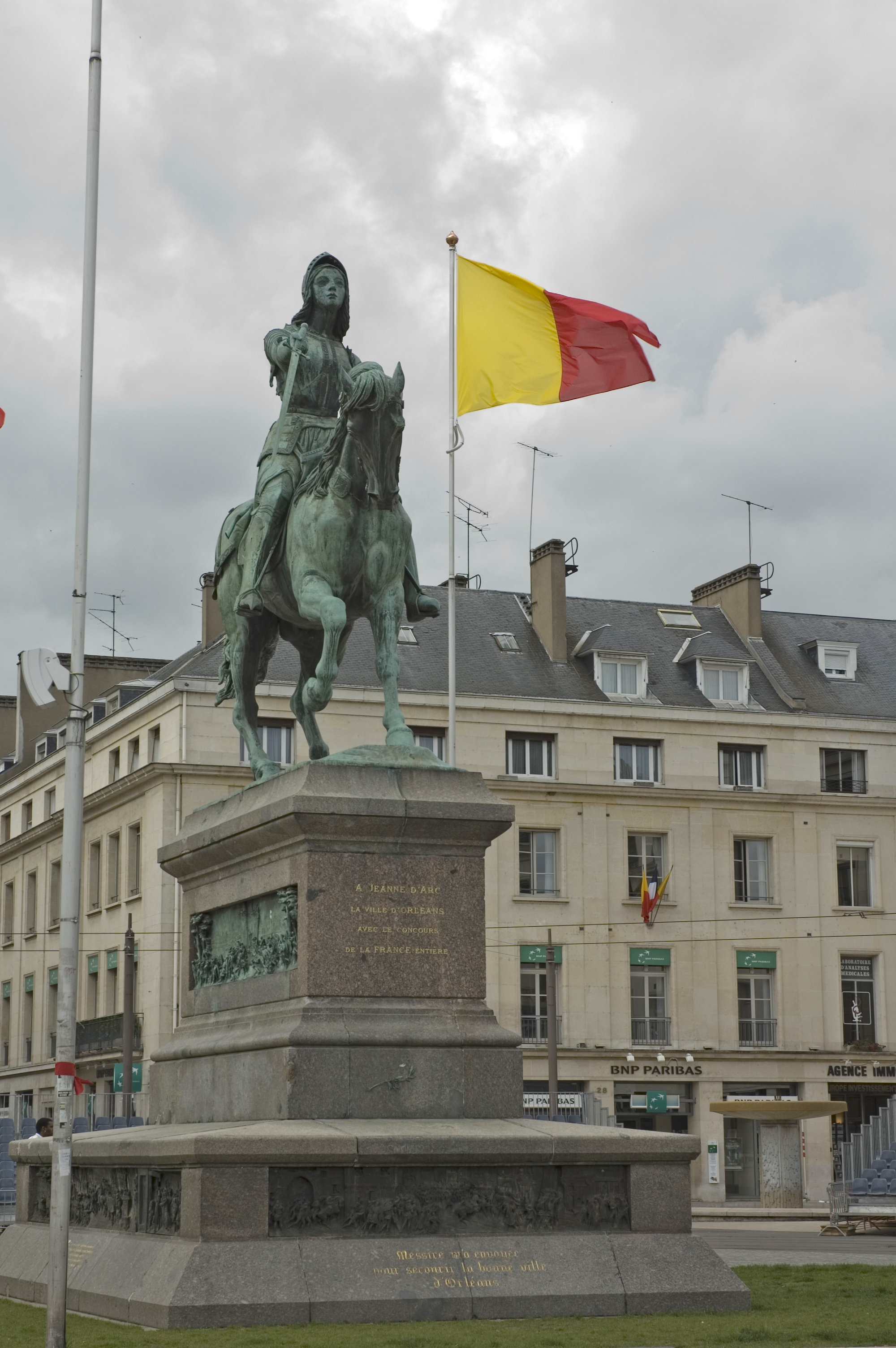
Orléans flag at the Joan of Arc statue

Flag	Commune	Date	Description
	Bourges, Cher		The flag has a vertical bicolour of green at the left and red at the right.
	Châteauroux, Indre		The flag has a vertical tricolour of groen, yellow and red. Green represents meadows, yellow harvests and red vines. The flag was originally that of Berry. It was taken over by the commune of Châteauroux.
	Joué-lès-Tours, Indre-et-Loire		The flag features the municipal logo on a white field.
	Orléans, Loiret		The flag has a vertical bicolour of yellow at the left and red at the right.
	Tours, Indre-et-Loire		Quasi banner of arms.

=== Corsica ===
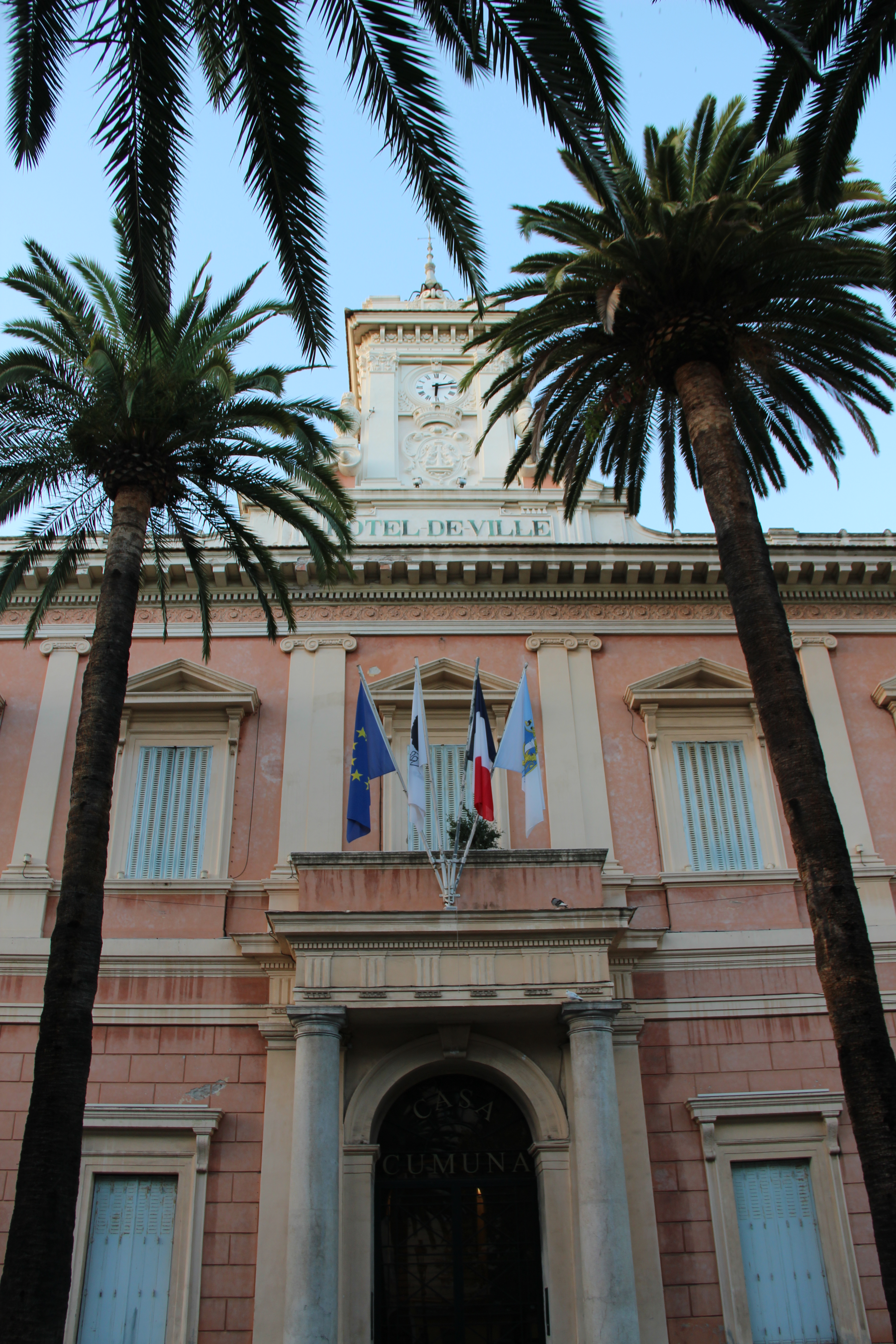
Ajaccio flag with coat of arms at the Ajaccio city hall

Flag	Commune	Date	Description
	Ajaccio, Corse-du-Sud		The flag has a vertical bicolour of blue at the left and white at the right.
	Bastia, Haute-Corse	2009	The flag features the municipal logo on a white field.
	Calvi, Haute-Corse		The flag has a white background with a red cross in the foreground.
	Cargèse, Corse-du-Sud		

=== Grand Est ===
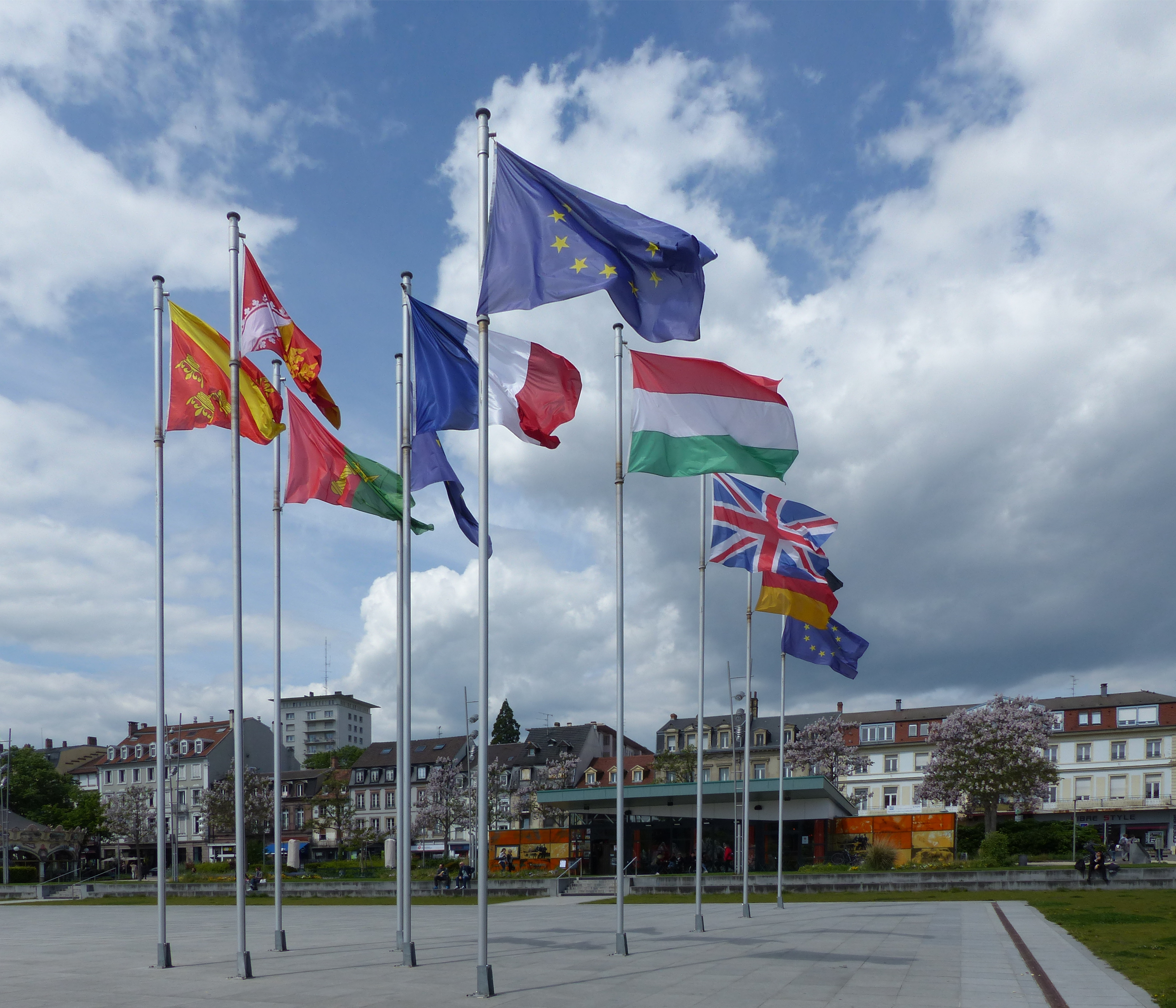
Flag of Colmar alongside several national and regional flags

Flag	Commune	Date	Description
	Charleville-Mézières, Ardennes		The flag has a vertical tricolour of blue, yellow and red. The three colours are taken from the municipal coat of arms.
	Colmar, Haut-Rhin		Banner of arms.
	Metz, Moselle		The flag has a vertical bicolour of white at the left and black at the right. The two colours are taken from the municipal coat of arms.
	Mulhouse, Haut-Rhin	1308	The flag is flamed with twenty red and white pieces, with an armorial canton featuring the Mulhouse Wheel. It was the official flag of the Republic of Mulhouse until Reunion in 1798.
	Reims, Marne		The flag is a horizontal bicolour consisting of a blue and white stripe. The colours are derived from the corresponding city coat of arms. In this, white was used as the background colour of the coat of arms and blue for the shield head.
	Strasbourg, Bas-Rhin	1262	The city flag is white and has a diagonal red stripe, a crossbar, across its width. The design is derived from the corresponding city coat of arms, which in turn is derived from old city seals. Possibly the division has to do with the (former) location of Strasbourg on the border between the Roman and Germanic empires. The red crossbar thereby refers to the name "The Road's Town" and the city's strategic location. The colours of the flag were also derived from the flag of Alsace.
	Toul, Meurthe-et-Moselle		

=== Hauts-de-France ===
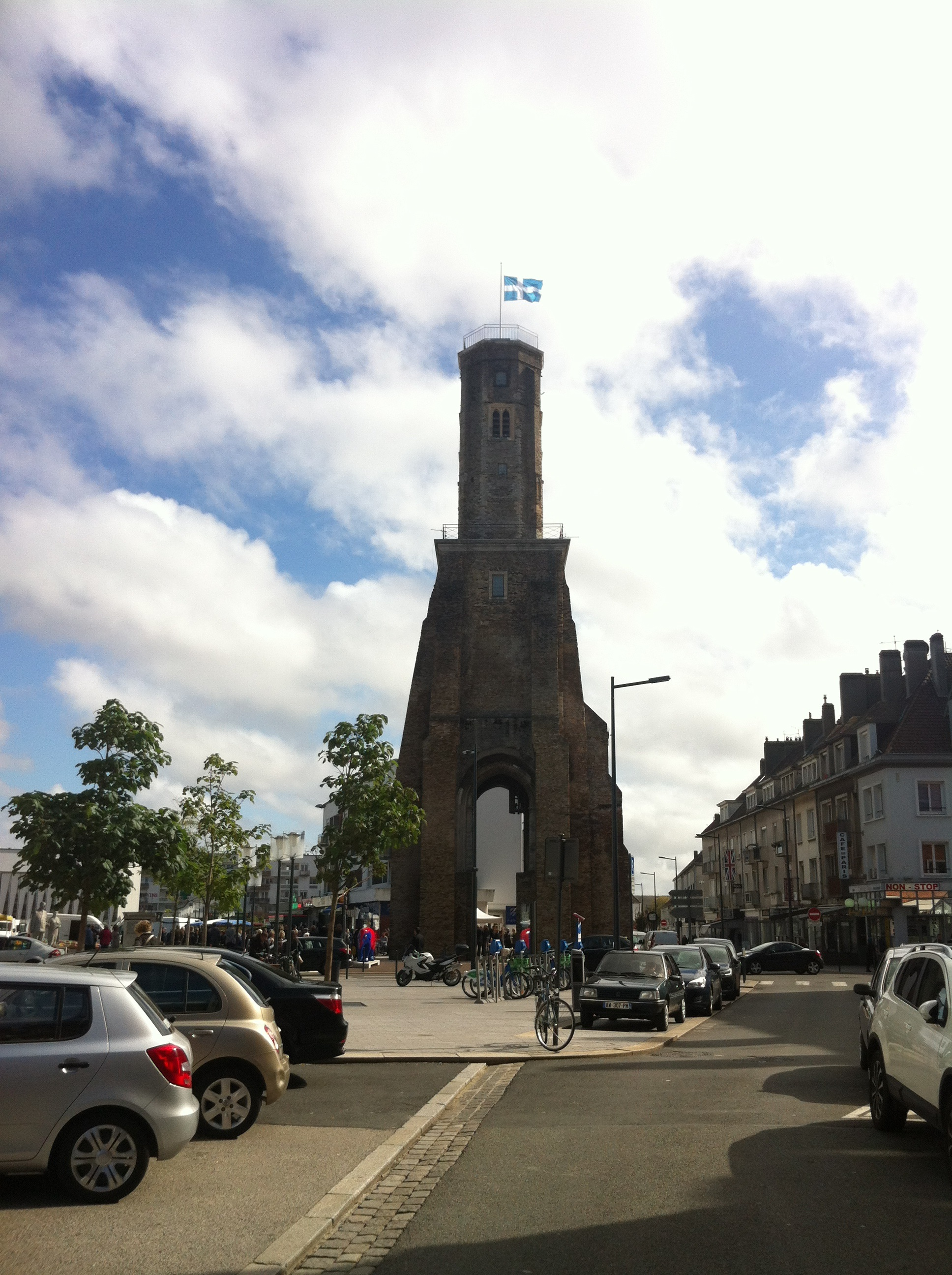
Calais flag at the Tour du Guet

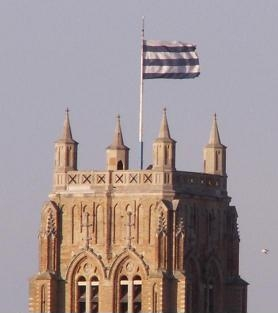
Dunkirk flag at the Belfry of Dunkirk

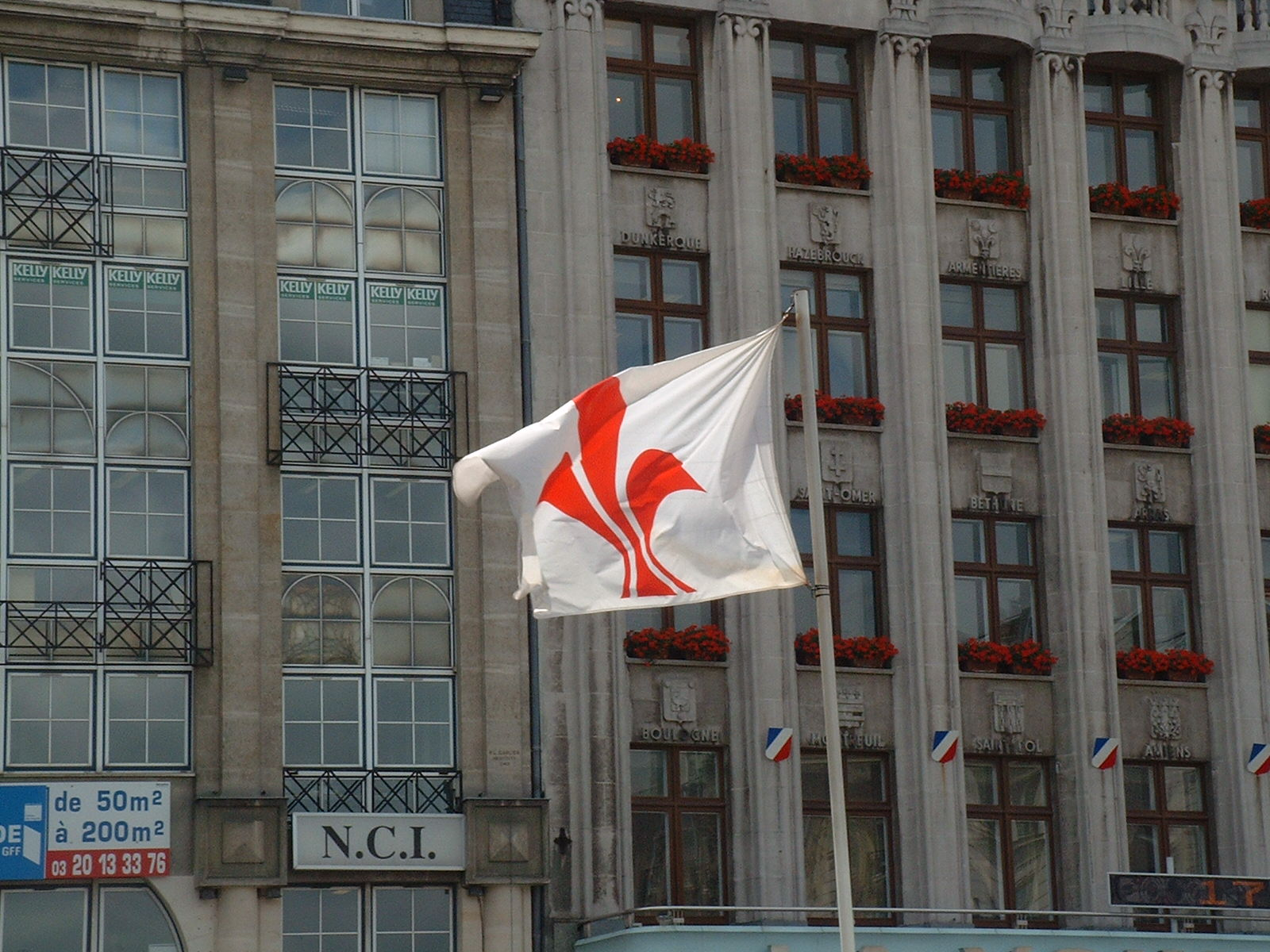
Former Lille flag, taken in 2007

Flag	Commune	Date	Description
	Amiens, Somme		Banner of arms.
	Avesnes-sur-Helpe, Nord		The flag consists of five horizontal stripes in the colours red and yellow.
	Boulogne-sur-Mer, Pas-de-Calais	1670	The town's flag is that of the Boulonnais militia, created in 1670 and divided into several regiments of infantry, cavalry and dragoons, whose sole purpose was to defend the province and the coast. The flag, known as the "flag of the Boulonnais troops", was set by the Duc d'Aumont, Louis-Marie-Augustin d'Aumont, governor of the town and the Boulonnais region. These flags were burned in 1792, along with some communal archives and wooden religious statues. Today, the flag flies atop the belfry and over the entrance to the town hall.
	Bray-Dunes, Nord		The flag has a horizontal tricolour of blue, yellow and green.
	Calais, Pas-de-Calais		The flag has a light blue background with a white Nordic cross in the foreground.
	Cambrai, Nord		The flag shows the municipal coat of arms on a yellow field. The gold-coloured flag represents Cambrai's traditional coat of arms: a golden coat of arms featuring a double-headed eagle of the Holy Roman Empire, each of whose heads are haloed in red (gules), as are the beaks and claws, and to which the Cambrésis coat of arms (Or, three azure lion cubs), the Legion of Honour and the Croix de guerre are affixed, all surmounted by a ducal crown.
	Dunkirk, Nord	17th century	The flag is silver fess azure, i.e. on a white background are three blue stripes, the lowest stripe being blue. The history of this flag is little known: under Spanish rule, the Dunkirk navy had its own flag. In 1662, when Dunkirk became definitively French, King Louis XIV honored the Dunkirk privateers with a special flag to encourage sea racing. Issued on June 24, 1684, it was white with a blue cross in the center. Over the following century, the Dunkirkers kept two flags: the first blue and white, and the second a red cross on a white background. On December 8, 1817, the Dunkirk flag was replaced by official decree by the Cherbourg flag, which is white with two blue stripes. Over time, the flag was given an extra stripe, and became the one we know today.
	Fort-Mardyck, Nord		The flag consists of four horizontal stripes in the colours white and red.
	Lens, Pas-de-Calais		The flag has a vertical bicolour of yellow at the left and blue at the right. The two colours are taken from the municipal coat of arms.
	Lille, Nord	2013-present	The flag of is a white field showing in its left a red stylised representation of a fleur-de-lis (This symbol is the modern logo of Lille derived from the city's coat of arms) with ville de in the centre in grey letters and lille on the right in large red letters. It is a logo flag.
	Lille, Nord	1987-2013	The former flag is white and displays a red fleur-de-lis in the centre. The fleur-de-lis comes from the former municipal logo.
	Lille, Nord	1945-1987	Banner of arms.
	Lille, Nord	1926-1939	Banner of arms, designed by Émile Théodore. Used till World War II
	Malo-les-Bains, Nord		
	Mardyck, Nord		The flag consists of six horizontal stripes in the colours blue and yellow.
	Montreuil, Pas-de-Calais		
	Petite-Synthe, Nord		The flag has a vertical bicolour of blue at the left and red at the right.
	Rosendaël, Nord		The flag consists of six horizontal stripes in the colours red and green.
	Saint-Pol-sur-Mer, Nord		The flag consists of six horizontal stripes in the colours white and green.
	Senlis, Oise		The flag has a vertical tricolour of red, yellow and red. The three colours are taken from the municipal coat of arms.
	Tourcoing, Nord		Banner of arms.

=== Île-de-France ===
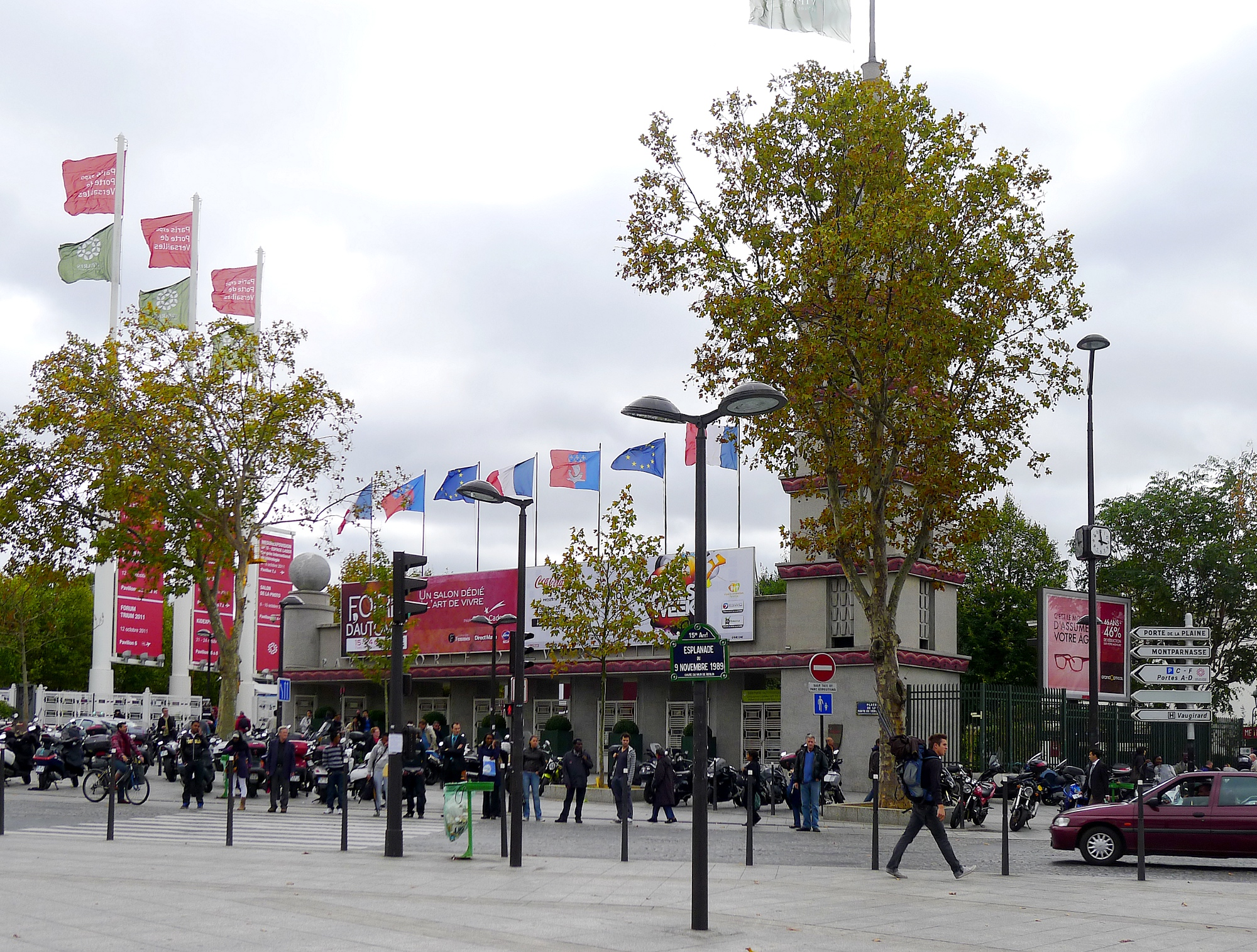
Paris flag used at the Paris Expo Porte de Versailles

Flag	Commune	Date	Description
	Étampes, Essonne		Banner of arms.
	Melun, Seine-et-Marne		
	Paris	1945	Main article: Flag of Paris In the center is the coat of arms of Paris. Red is identified with Saint Denis, blue with Saint Martin. The color scheme is traced to the French flag adopted during the French Revolution.
	Vincennes, Val-de-Marne	2007	Created in 2007 to mark the Year of the Château and the reopening of the keep to the public, the flag takes up the elements of the coat of arms. The chief of the coat of arms takes pride of place at the flagstaff, while the silhouette of the keep and the three cannonballs stand out against the red field of the fly. Designed by Olivier Touzeau.

=== Normandy ===
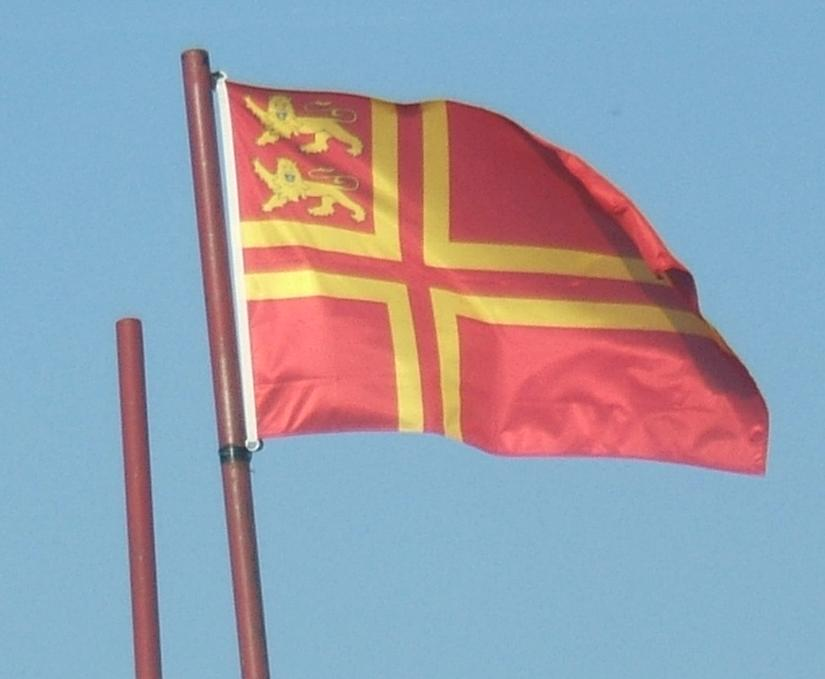
Falaise cross flag flying on top of the Château de Falaise.

Flag	Commune	Date	Description
	Falaise, Calvados		Norman flag with Nordic cross, nicknamed Saint-Olaf's Cross, adopted by William the Conqueror's hometown as a reminder of his Scandinavian origins.
	Le Havre, Seine-Maritime		The flag shows the municipal coat of arms on a white field.
	Rouen, Seine-Maritime		The flag is derived from the municipal logo. The flag is blue with a vertical red stripe along the hoist, with 'Rouen' written in white letters and a yellow picture near the fly. The picture of the Paschal lamb is from the coat of arms of Rouen.

=== Nouvelle-Aquitaine ===
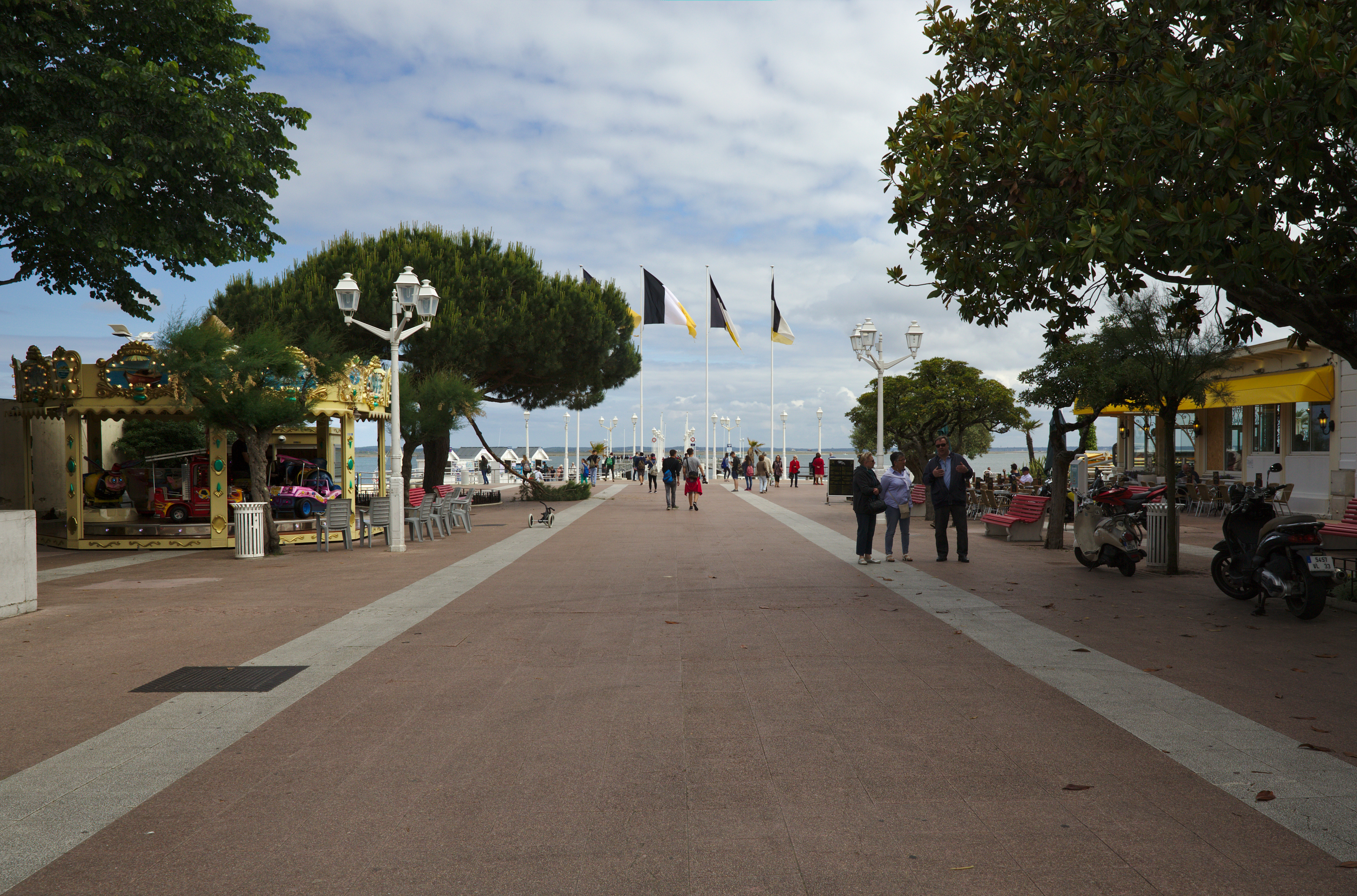
Arcachon flag at the Jetée Thiers

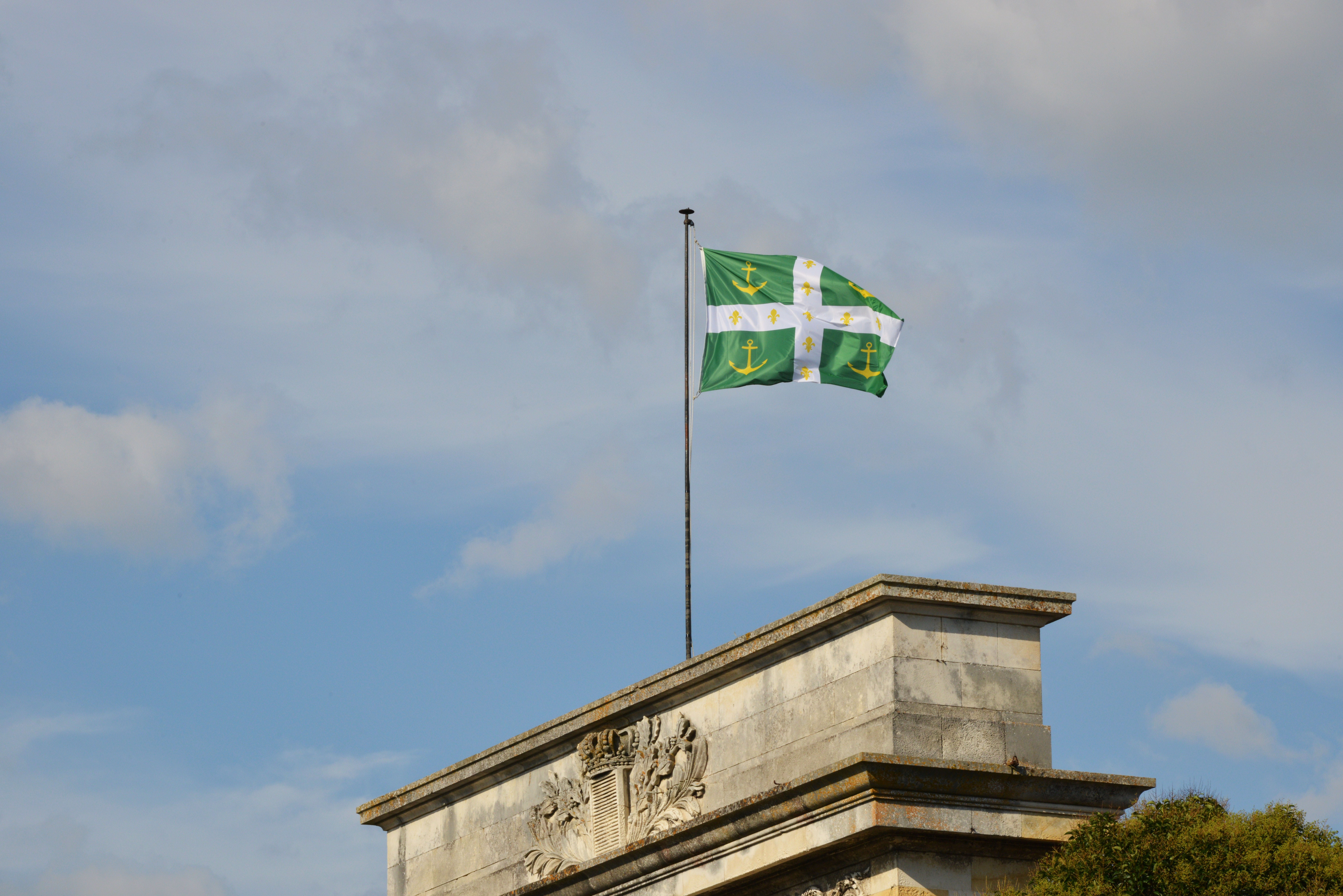
Rochefort flag at the Porte du Soleil (Sun Gate)

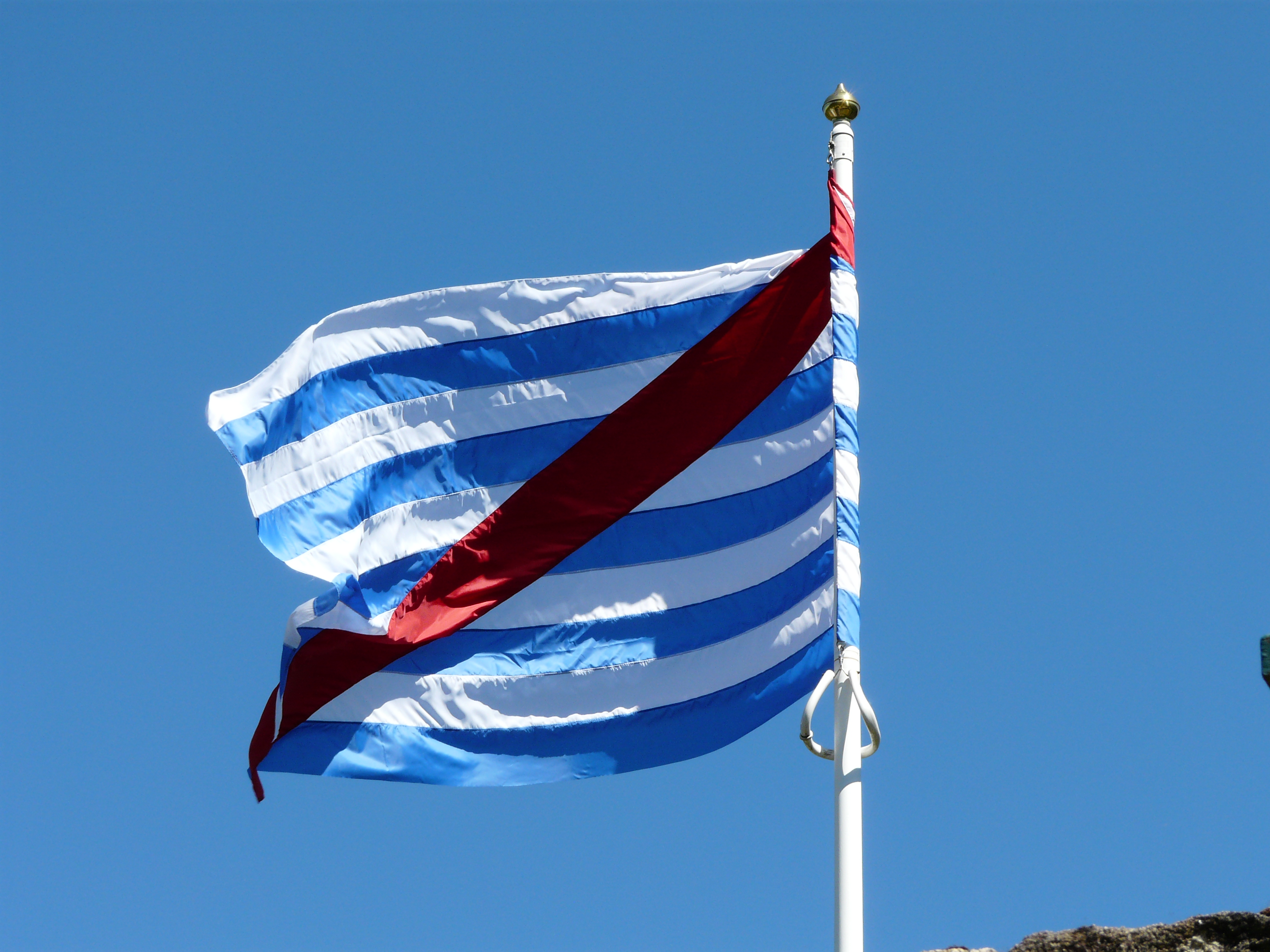
Gimel-les-Cascades flag, taken from the arms of the Lords of Gimel, Corrèze, France

Flag	Commune	Date	Description
	Agen, Lot-et-Garonne		
	Arcachon, Gironde	1857	The flag has a vertical tricolour of black, white and yellow. The town of Arcachon regularly uses the flag shown opposite, which was adopted in 1857 when the town was created, while the meaning of the colors has changed over time, these three colors were adopted by the French flag. Black represents darkness, past failures and solitude; white represents the present and the awakening of consciousness, recalling the dawn; yellow represents the light of the future and the city.
	Bayonne, Pyrénées-Atlantiques		The flag has a horizontal bicolour of red at the top and green at the bottom.
	Biarritz, Pyrénées-Atlantiques		The flag has a vertical bicolour of red at the left and black at the right.
	Bordeaux, Gironde		The flag shows the municipal coat of arms on a white field. The red and blue shield in the centre contains three fleur-de-lis, a leopard or lion, a white castle and a crescent moon.
	Châtelaillon-Plage, Charente-Maritime		The flag has a vertical tricolour of blue, yellow and blue.
	Gimel-les-Cascades, Corrèze		Banner of arms.
	Gujan-Mestras, Gironde		The flag has a vertical tricolour of blue, green and blue.
	Langon, Gironde		Banner of arms.
	Rochefort, Charente-Maritime		Opposite, the Rochefort flag flying over the pediment of the town hall and the Porte du Soleil.

=== Occitania ===
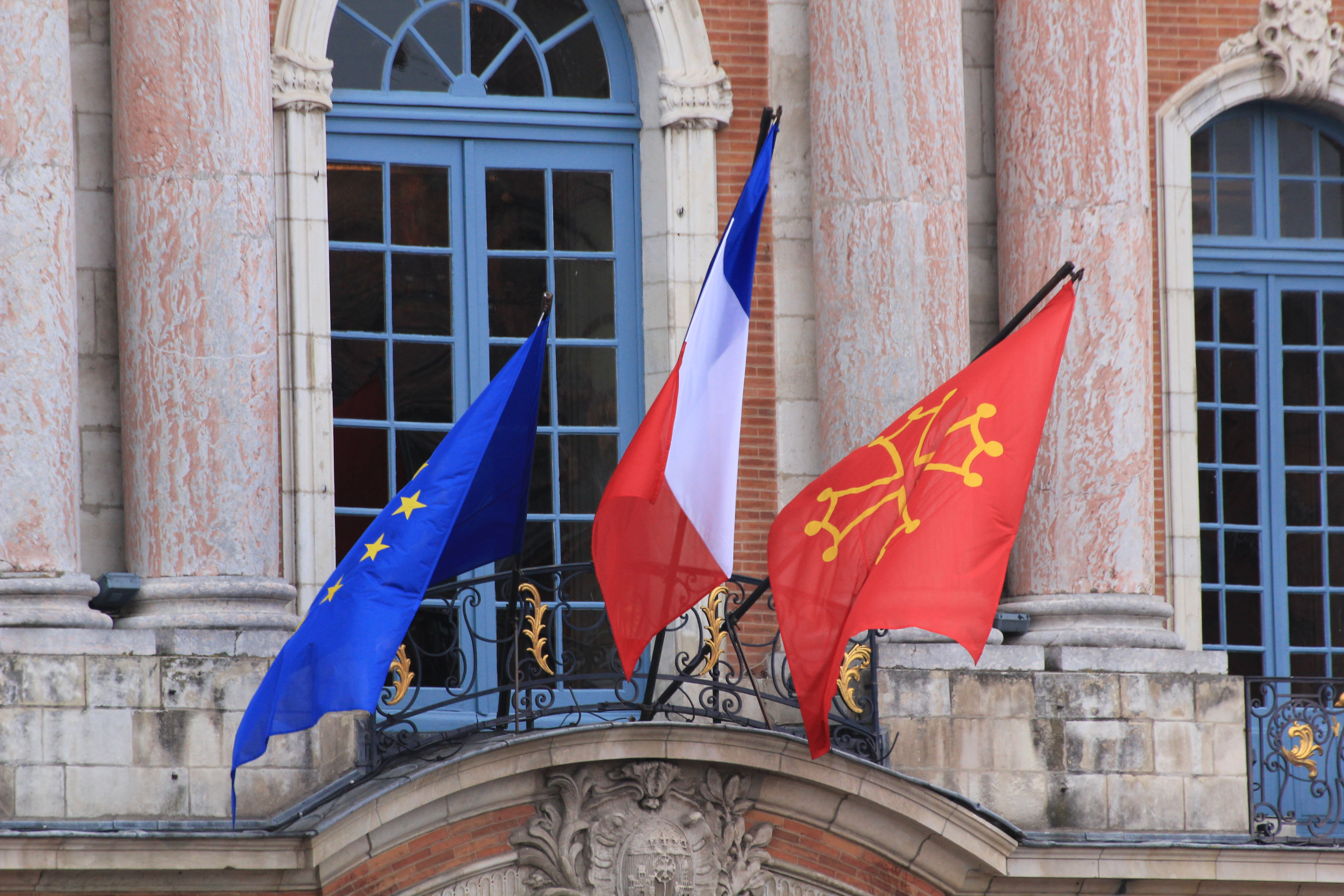
Toulouse flag at the balcony of Capitole de Toulouse

Flag	Commune	Date	Description
	Aiguefonde, Tarn		The flag has a vertical tricolour of green, blue and white.
	Béziers, Hérault		The flag is a blue and red bicolor charged with the city's coat of arms. It is used officially by the town council and flies in front of the Arènes and the Palais des Congrès.
	Cahors, Lot		The flag has a horizontal bicolour of blue at the top and white at the bottom.
	Foix, Ariège		Banner of arms.
	Montpellier, Hérault		The flag shows the municipal coat of arms on a white field. This shows the Virgin Mary holding her son Jesus and seated on a throne. At the top left and right, the capital letters A and M can be seen. These stand for the words Ave Maria. At the bottom of the coat of arms is a white shield with a red circle. This represents the coat of arms of the Guilhem dynasty. Guilhem was a lord who ruled Montpellier between the 11th and 13th centuries.
	Narbonne, Aude		The flag has a vertical bicolour of blue at the left and red at the right. The two colours are taken from the municipal coat of arms.
	Toulouse, Haute-Garonne	1211	The city flag is red and shows a large yellow cross in the centre. This is the Occitan cross and dates back as far as 1211. At the time, it appeared on a seal. The cross was derived from a Latin cross and probably assigned to Raymond VI. Raymond was a leader of the low Crusaders and, according to legend, had the same cross affixed to the shields of his men. In order to attach the cross to a shield, the design had to be modified in a practical sense. Then, gradually, the Occitan cross was created.

=== Pays de la Loire ===
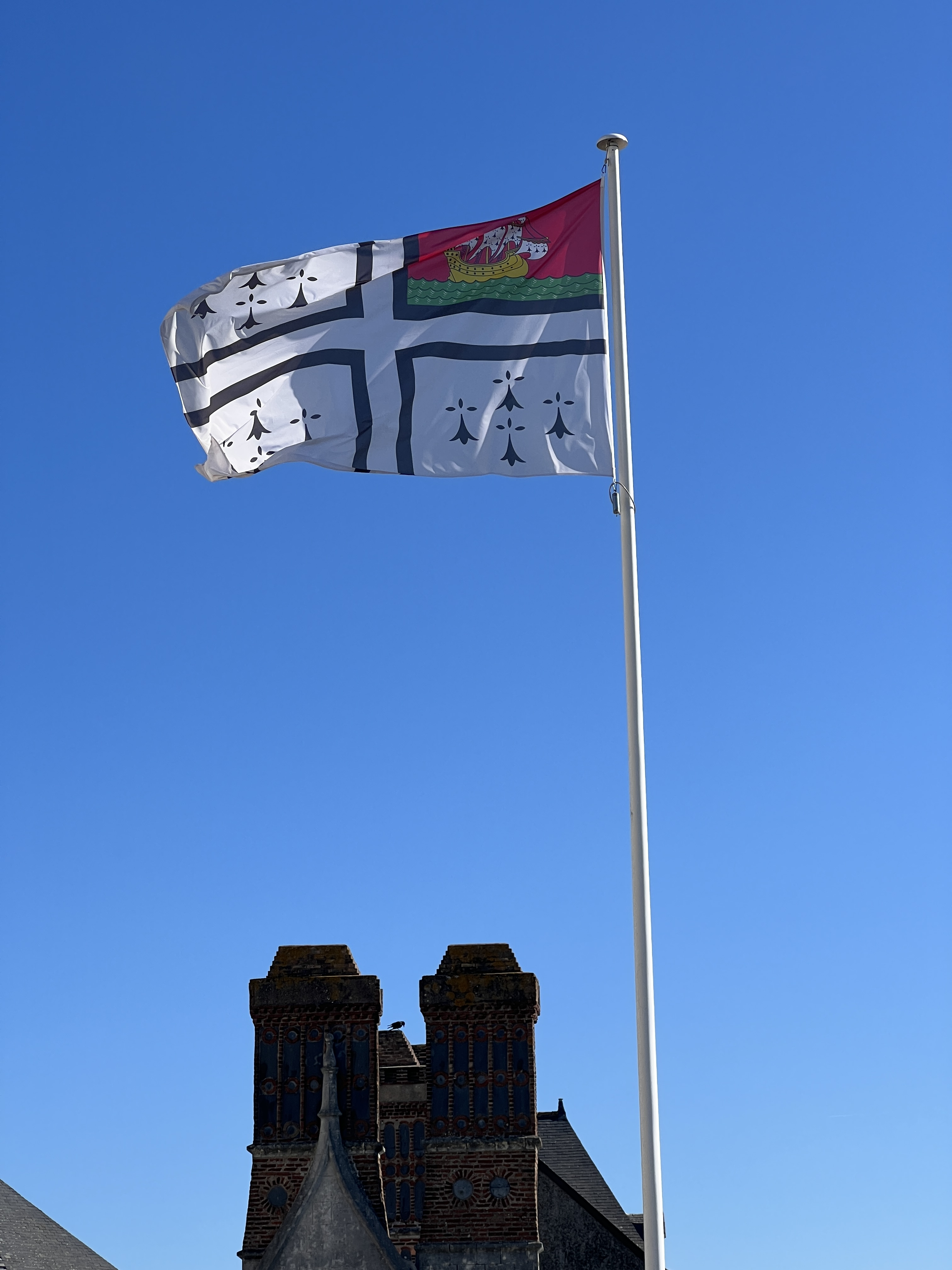
Flag of Nantes in the Château des ducs de Bretagne.

Flag	Commune	Date	Description
	Angers, Maine-et-Loire		
	Donges, Loire-Atlantique		Banner of arms.
	L'Île-d'Olonne, Vendée		
	Le Longeron, Maine-et-Loire		Banner of arms.
	Nantes, Loire-Atlantique		White cross of the Kingdom of France on the black cross of Brittany. A ship against a red background on a green and white sea in the canton. These are common heraldic elements that were widely used by knights on their arms.
	Rezé, Loire-Atlantique		Banner of arms.
	Saint-Nazaire, Loire-Atlantique		

=== Provence-Alpes-Côte d'Azur ===
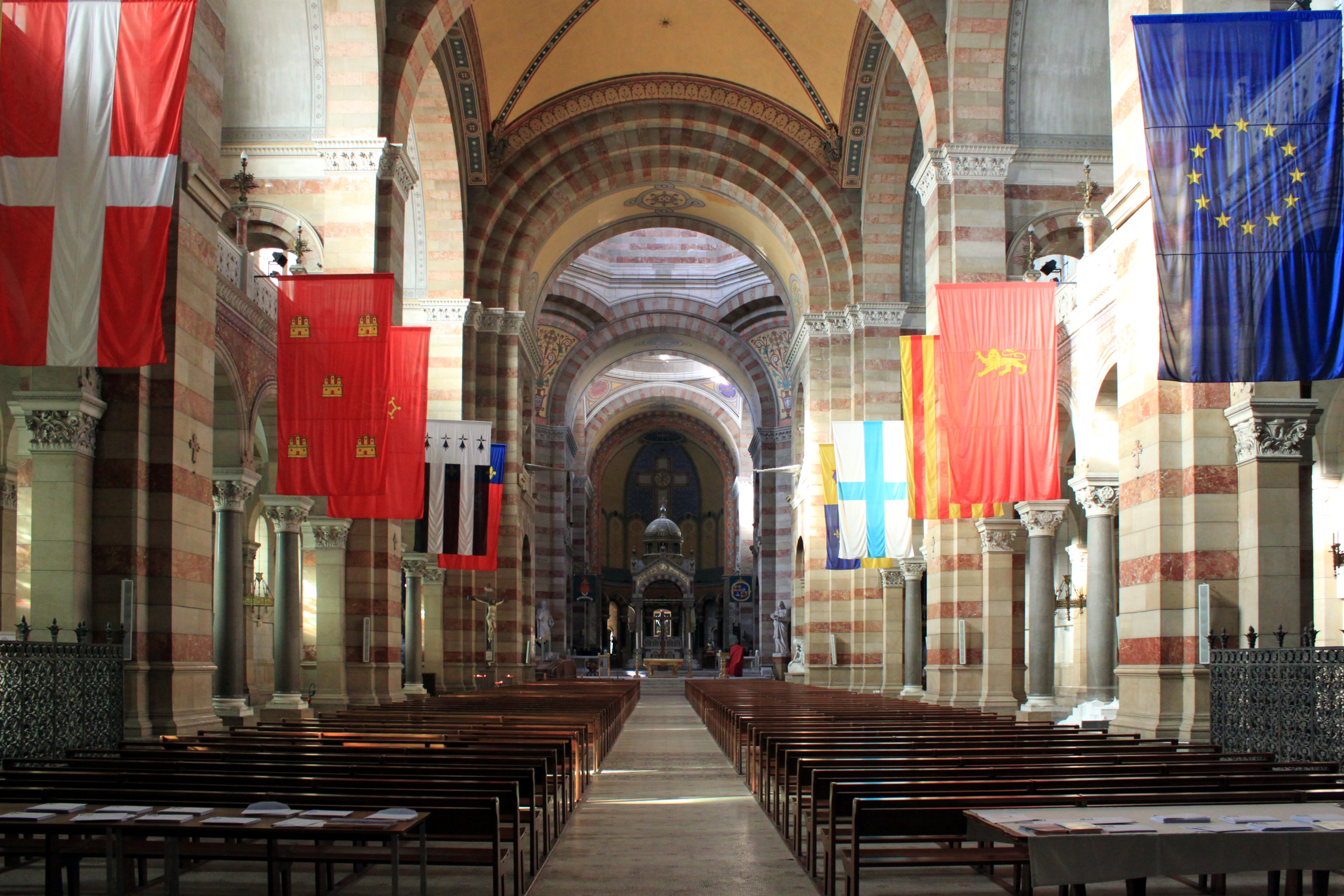
Marseille flag (on the right side) in the Cathedral of Saint Mary Major

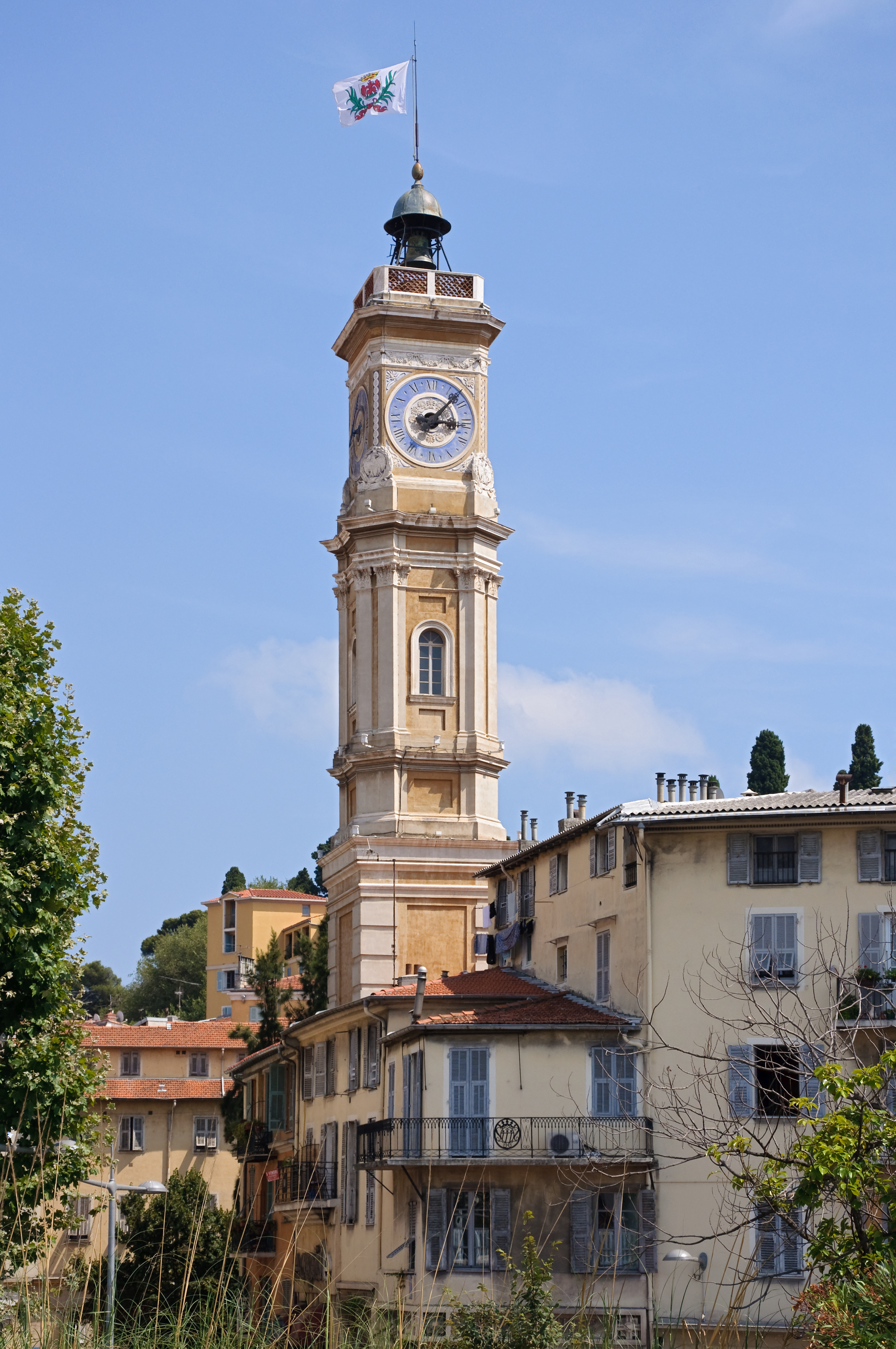
The Saint-François tower ('tour Saint-François') in Nice on the French Riviera. The flag of Nice flies on the top of this clock tower, formerly bell tower of a Franciscan monastery.

Flag	Commune	Date	Description
	Aix-en-Provence, Bouches-du-Rhône		The flag used by the town is composed of two stripes: one red and the other yellow, the colours of Provence. According to some sources, a red and yellow quartered flag also existed.
	Antibes, Alpes-Maritimes		
	Arles, Bouches-du-Rhône		The flag has a vertical bicolour of blue at the left and yellow at the right. The two colours are taken from the municipal coat of arms.
	Cagnes-sur-Mer, Alpes-Maritimes		The flag has a vertical bicolour of blue at the left and red at the right.
	Cannes, Alpes-Maritimes		The flag shows the municipal coat of arms on a white or blue field.
	Fréjus, Var		The commune has a flag, used for events such as the bravade, which features the colors of the coat of arms, two vertical stripes, red on the staff side and white on the outside.
	Hyères, Var		
	Marseille, Bouches-du-Rhône	13th century	Main article: Flag of Marseille The city flag is white and displays a light blue cross across its entire surface. The flag is widely used in France for boats and buildings. The cross is a reference to the flags of the crusaders, while azure is the colour of the city. Attested since the 11th century, it is one of the oldest French and European flags. The first preserved representation of Marseille's coat of arms dates from the end of the 11th century.
	Nice, Alpes-Maritimes	14th century	Flag of the County of Nice (1108–1176) The flag is white with three blue wavy lines at the bottom. Above are elements of the city coat of arms: a red eagle posing on three green hills. The eagle is an imperial emblem and a reference to the House of Savoy, which ruled over the land around Nice. This land (and territorial honour) is represented by the three hills, although they are not geographically correct.
	Saint-Raphaël, Var		The flag has a vertical bicolour of blue at the left and yellow at the right. The two colours are taken from the municipal coat of arms. The old logo had these background colors, which the new one no longer has.
	Saint-Tropez, Provence-Alpes-Côte d'Azur		The commune's flag features the colors of the privateers, with three red, white and red stripes, placed either vertically or horizontally.
	Toulon, Var		The flag has a blue background with a yellow cross in the foreground.
	Vedène, Vaucluse		

== Overseas region ==
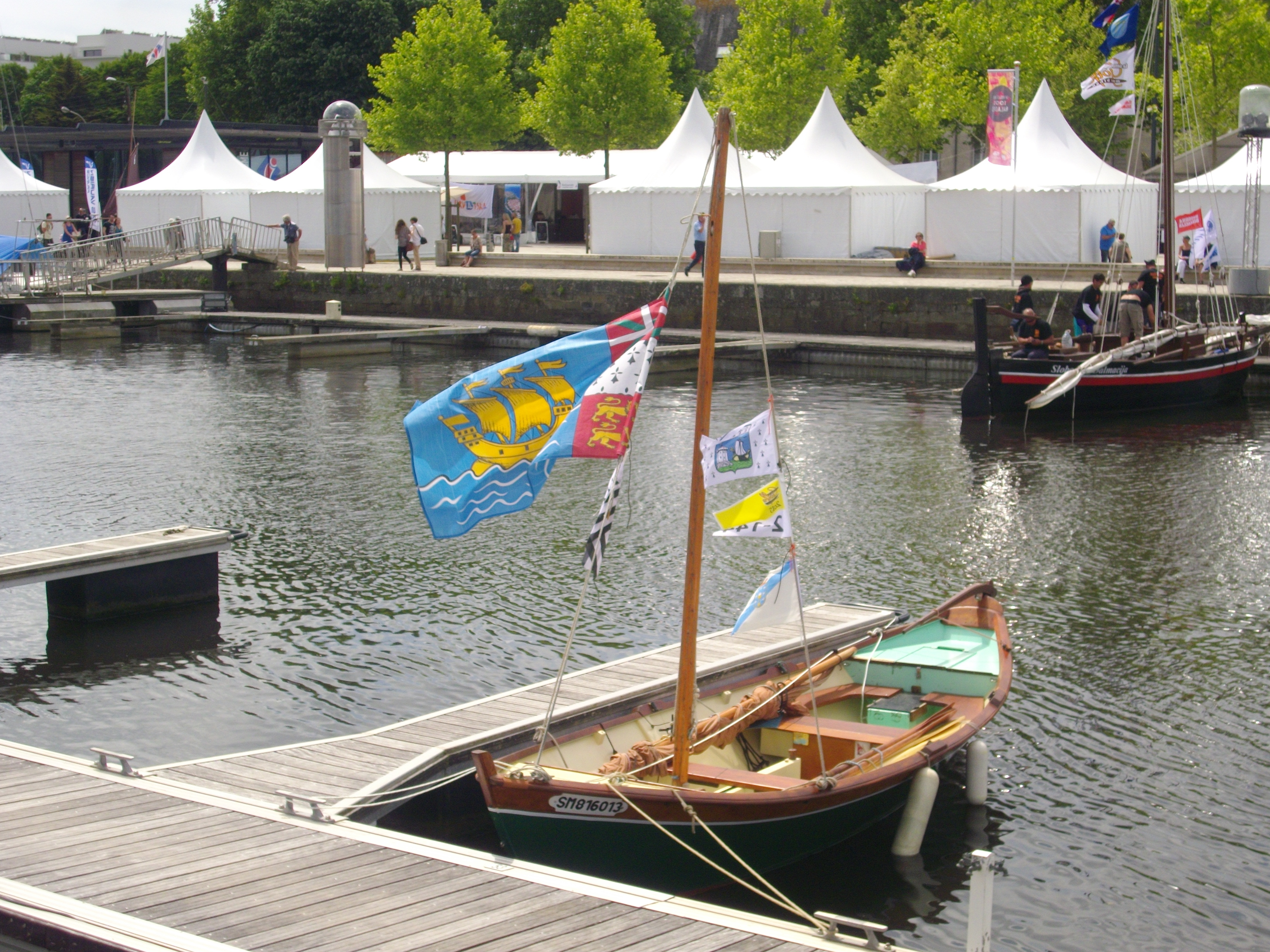
Saint Pierre and Miquelon flag at Vannes

Flag	Commune	Date	Description
	Cayenne, French Guiana		The flag features the municipal logo on a white field. Banner of arms.
	Miquelon-Langlade, Saint Pierre and Miquelon		Banner of arms.
	Saint-Denis, Réunion		
	Saint-Pierre, Saint Pierre and Miquelon	1982	The flag is blue with a yellow ship, said to be Grande Hermine, which brought Jacques Cartier to Saint Pierre on 15 June 1536. Three square fields placed along the hoist recall the origin of most inhabitants of the islands, from top to bottom, Basques, Bretons, and Normans.

== See also ==
- List of French flags
- Flag of France
