= List of Occitan flags =

This is a list of flags that are used exclusively in Occitania. Other flags used in Occitania, as well as the rest of France can be found at list of French flags.

== National minority flags ==
Flag	Date	Use	Description
	-	Flag of Occitania	A red banner with the cross of Toulouse.
	-	Flag of Occitania	A red banner with the cross of Toulouse. Version with star
	-	Flag of Occitania	Provence (i.e. Occitania) flag with the Félibrige star

== Regional flags ==
Flag	Date	Use	Description
	2016	Flag of Occitanie	This flag is sometimes flown by government institutions. The region has no official flag.

== Departmental flags ==
Flag	Date	Use	Description
		Flag of Ariège	Banner of arms is used culturally. The logo flag is the official regional flag.
		Flag of Aude	Banner of arms is used culturally. The logo flag is the official regional flag.
		Flag of Aveyron	
		Flag of Gard	
		Flag of Gers	
		Flag of Haute-Garonne	
		Flag of Hérault	
		Flag of Lot	
		Flag of Lozère	
		Flag of Pyrénées-Orientales	
		Flag of Tarn	
		Flag of Tarn-et-Garonne	

== Historical flags ==
Flag	Date	Use	Description
	778-1271	Flag of the County of Toulouse	
	1956-2016	Flag of Languedoc-Roussillon	
	1956-2016	Flag of the Midi-Pyrénées	

== See also ==
- List of French flags

== Footnotes ==
- ^reg Registered at the French Society of Vexillology.
