= List of Corsican flags =

This is a list of Corsican flags, including symbolic national and sub-regional flags, standards and banners used exclusively in Corsica.

== Regional flags ==
Flag	Date	Use	Description
	1755	Traditional flag of Corsica (Registered by the French Society of Vexillology)	
		Variant of the traditional flag of Corsica	

== Historical flags ==
Flag	Date	Use	Description
	14th century	Flag of Corsica	
	until 1755	Flag of Corsica	
	1794 - 1796	Flag of The Anglo-Corsican Kingdom	

== City flags ==
Flag	Date	Use	Description
		Flag of Ajaccio	
	2009-present	Flag of Bastia	
		Flag of Calvi	
		Flag of Cargèse	

== See also ==
- List of French flags

== Footnotes ==
- ^reg Registered at the French Society of Vexillology.
