= List of flags of Pays de la Loire =

This is a list of flags that are used exclusively in Pays de la Loire. Other flags used in Pays de la Loire, as well as the rest of France can be found at list of French flags.

== Regional flags ==
Flag	Date	Use	Description
	1986 (de facto)	Traditional flag of Pays de la Loire ^{reg}	Banner of arms.

== Departmental flags ==
Flag	Date	Use	Description
		Flag of Loire-Atlantique	The Loire-Atlantique department forms part of the traditional cultural region of Brittany, although it is currently administered as part of the Pays de la Loire region.
		Flag of Maine-et-Loire	A blue and red flag with three fleur-de-lis.
		Flag of Mayenne	
		Flag of Sarthe	
		Flag of Vendée	Argent two hearts voided and entwined surmounted by a crown voided and a crosslet all gules.

== City and town flags ==
Flag	Date	Use	Description
		Flag of Donges	A blue and yellow checkerboard pattern.
		Flag of Guérande	
		Flag of Nantes	
		Flag of Nort-sur-Erdre	
		Flag of Rezé	
		Flag of Saint-Nazaire	

== Traditional districts ==
Flag	Date	Use	Description
		Flag of Pays d'Ancenis	
		Flag of Pays de Retz	

== See also ==
- List of Breton flags
- List of French flags

== Notes ==
- ^reg Registered at the French Society of Vexillology.
