= Communist Party for Independence and Socialism =

Communist Party for Independence and Socialism Pati Kominis pou Lendépandans èk Sosyalism
- Abbreviation: PKLS
- Spokesperson: Jean-Pierre Etilé
- Founded: May 22, 1984
- Split from: Martinican Communist Party
- Headquarters: 9 impasse du Capitaine Pierre Rose, 97200 Fort-de-France Cedex
- Newspaper: Patriyot
- Ideology: Communism; Marxism–Leninism; Martinican independence
- Political position: Far-left
- International affiliation: São Paulo Forum

Website
- www.pkls.org

Communist Party for Independence and Socialism (French: Parti Communiste pour l'Indépendance et le Socialisme, PCLS; French: Pati Kominis pou Lendépandans èk Sosyalism in Martinican Creole, PKLS) is a Marxist-Leninist communist party and pro-independence political party in Martinique.

The party defines itself as a Marxist–Leninist party. It boycotts the political institutions and does not take part in elections.

It publishes the monthly "Patriyote".

Beyond local politics, the PKLS seeks to integrate Martinique into regional Caribbean structures and maintain international affiliations, including participating as a member organization of the São Paulo Forum.

== History ==
In 1984 an important faction of the Martinican Communist Party, who were unhappy with the party's acceptance of the decentralisation laws, broke away and founded the PKLS on May 22, 1984. The date of the party's foundation purposely coincide with the Martinican Slave revolt of 1848.
