= Flag of Lyon =

Flag of a city

Lyon
- Use: Civil flag
- Proportion: 3:2

The flag of Lyon consists of a rectangular cloth on which the elements of its coat of arms are displayed, it is therefore a heraldic flag. Habitually it counts on habitual proportions of 3:2 and it is a flag for civil use, since in the City hall and its dependencies only the French national flag is raised.

The shield proper of Lyon consists of a field of gules (red color), in which a lion appears rampant (of profile and erect) and of silver (white color). This coat of arms is augmented from a heraldic chief, the division occupying the upper third. This is the "Head of France", granted to all "Bonnes Villes", which shows the heraldry of his former monarchs: of azure laden with three golden fleurs de lys (a blue background adorned with three yellow lily flowers).

In the 13th century, merchants' guilds embarked on a revolt against the power of the Archbishop-Count of Lyon. These used their own flags with a lion to symbolize their strength, forcing in 1320 King Philip V of France to intervene in this conflict. As a result of the intervention of the king, the city happened to depend directly on the French Crown, being included the list of "Bonnes Villes" and receiving its shield (and flag) of arms. In 1376, King Charles V simplified its heraldry, reducing to three the indeterminate number of fleurs de lys that hitherto covered the entire space of the royal armories and heraldic chiefs of the "Bonnes Villes".
