= Breton Communist Party =

Communist party in Brittany, France (1971–1974)

Breton Communist Party: Parti communiste Breton; Strollad Komunour Breizh
- Leader: Kristian Hamon
- Founded: 1 February 1971
- Dissolved: 1974
- Ideology: Breton nationalism; Communism; Maoism (majority)
- Political position: Far-left

Party flag

The Breton Communist Party (Note: French: Parti communiste Breton, abbr. PCB; Breton: Strollad Komunour Breizh) was a minor communist party in Brittany, France. It advocated an independent and socialist Brittany and consisted mainly of Maoists who broke from the Breton Democratic Union after the leftist uprising of May 68. The party had a minor presence in the French Left and did not see electoral success with its candidates, who were unaffiliated on the ballot. It dissolved in 1974.

== History ==
The Breton Communist Party (PCB) can trace its origins to the leftist Breton Democratic Union (UDB) and the May 68 period of civil unrest in France. The slow electoral progress of the UDB convinced many of its younger members to create a new, more radical party; the PCB was one of many organisations that emerged from this development. Yann-Morvan Gefflot and Jean-Pierre Vigier jointly founded the party on 1 February 1971, uniting a diverse membership of communists of different currents under the shared goal of an independent Brittany. However, most members self-identified as Maoists.

Immediately after its founding, the PCB ran unaffiliated candidates in local elections but found no electoral success. Its impact on French left-wing politics outside of elections was also minimal. The party dissolved a few years later in 1974.

== Ideology ==
The PCB was a communist party that supported the establishment of an independent, socialist Brittany. Its members were mainly Maoists, but the membership had communists of other currents, including council communists, Guevarists, spontaneists (foquismoists), anti-Stalinists, and libertarian socialists. Jacques Duclos, a prominent contemporary member of the French Communist Party, criticised the PCB's ostensible ideological fluidity, saying: "I do not know if [the PCB] is Breton, but I can tell you that it is not communist." The party supported the militant Breton Revolutionary Army, founded around the same time in 1971.
