= French Society of Vexillology =

Non-profit organization

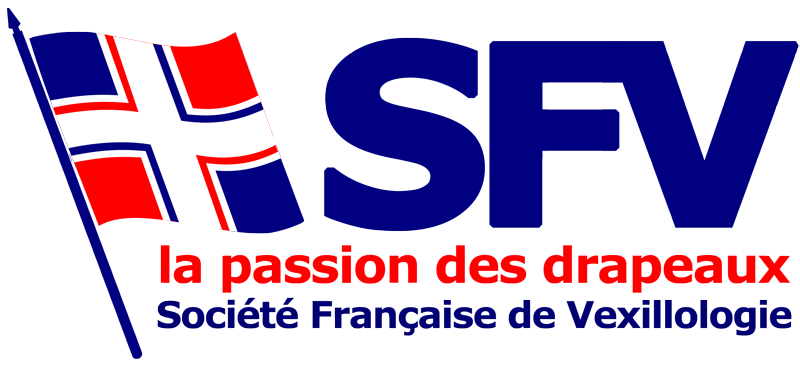
- Formation: 16 March 1985
- Founder: Hervé Pinoteau
- Type: Charitable incorporated organisation
- Purpose: Vexillology
- Location: Paris, France
- Website: http://www.drapeaux-sfv.org/

The Société française de vexillologie (French Society of Vexillology), or SFV, is a free, non-profit association of vexillology and heraldry enthusiasts of France. The centre aims principally at promoting the study of the history, symbolism and usage of flags, and preserving related documents. It was founded in 1985 in Paris and is a FIAV member since 1991.

The organization has an official, six-monthly, journal called Drapeaux et Pavillons, reserved to its members.

== See also ==
- International Federation of Vexillological Associations (FIAV)
