= Banner of arms =

Flag which has the same image as a coat of arms

A banner of arms is a type of heraldic flag, characterised by sharing its imagery with that of the coat of arms (i.e. the shield of a full heraldic achievement, rendered in a square or rectangular shape of the flag).

The term is derived from the terminology of heraldry but is also used in vexillology. Examples of modern national flags which are banners of arms are the flags of Austria, Iraq, and Switzerland.

The banner of arms is sometimes simply called a banner, but a banner is in a more strict sense a one of a kind personal flag of a nobleman held in battle.

== Examples ==
=== National / state flags ===
Country	Flag	Coat of arms from which the flag is derived or vice versa
Albania		
Albania	Flag of Albania	Coat of arms of Albania (1992-1998)
Algeria		
Algeria	Flag of Algeria	Coat of arms of Algeria (1962-1971)
Australia		
Australia	King's Flag for Australia	Coat of arms of Australia
Austria		
Austria	Flag of Austria	Coat of arms of Austria
Bosnia and Herzegovina		
Bosnia and Herzegovina	Flag of Bosnia and Herzegovina	Coat of arms of Bosnia and Herzegovina
Burkina Faso		
Burkina Faso	Flag of Burkina Faso	Coat of arms of Burkina Faso
Canada		
Canada	Sovereign's Flag for Canada	Coat of arms of Canada
Croatia		
Croatia	Flag of Croatia (early 16th century)	Coat of arms of Croatia
Czech Republic		
Czech Republic	War Flag of the Czech Republic	Coat of arms of the Czech Republic
Denmark		
Denmark	Royal Banner of Denmark (14th century)	Coat of arms of Denmark
Finland		
Finland	Temporary state flag (December 1917 – May 1918)	Coat of arms of Finland
Gabon		
Gabon	Presidential Standard (1960–1990)	Coat of arms of Gabon
Greece		
Greece	Flag of Greece (historical)	Coat of arms of Greece
Hungary		
Hungary	Flag of Hungary	Coat of arms of Hungary (1957-1990)
Iceland		
Iceland	Flag of Iceland	Coat of arms of Iceland
Iraq		
Iraq	Flag of Iraq	Coat of arms of Iraq
Ireland		
Ireland	Presidential Standard of Ireland	Coat of arms of Ireland
Israel		
Israel	Presidential standard of Israel	Coat of arms of Israel
Kiribati		
Kiribati	Flag of Kiribati	Coat of arms of Kiribati
Kosovo		
Kosovo	Flag of Kosovo	Coat of arms of Kosovo
Lithuania		
Lithuania	Flag of Lithuania (state)	Coat of arms of Lithuania
Luxembourg		
Luxembourg	Flag of Luxembourg for use at sea and in air	Lesser coat of arms of Luxembourg
Malta		
Malta	Flag of Malta	Coat of arms of Malta
Monaco		
Monaco	Flag of Monaco (alternative)	Coat of arms of Monaco
Morocco		
Morocco	Flag of Morocco	Coat of arms of Morocco (French protectorate)
Namibia		
Namibia	Flag of Namibia	Coat of arms of Namibia
New Zealand		
New Zealand	Coronation Standard of New Zealand	Coat of arms of New Zealand
North Macedonia		
North Macedonia	Flag of North Macedonia	Coat of arms of the President of North Macedonia
Norway		
Norway	Royal Standard of Norway	Coat of arms of Norway
Palestine	Flag of Palestine	Coat of arms of Palestine
Palestine	Flag of Palestine	Coat of arms of Palestine
Poland		
Poland	Presidential jack of Poland	Coat of arms of Poland
Portugal		
Portugal	Flag of Portugal (heraldic and historical)	
Portugal	Royal standard of King Pedro IV (historical)	Coat of arms of Portugal
Serbia		
Serbia	Banner of arms of Serbia	Coat of arms of Serbia
Slovakia		
Slovakia	Presidential Standard of Slovakia	Coat of arms of Slovakia
Somalia		
Somalia	Flag of Somalia	Coat of arms of Somalia
Sweden		
Sweden	Royal Standard of Sweden (The King's personal)	Coat of arms of Sweden
Switzerland		
Switzerland	Flag of Switzerland	Coat of arms of Switzerland
Tonga		
Tonga	Royal Standard of Tonga	Coat of arms of Tonga
Turkey		
Turkey	Flag of Turkey	Emblem of Turkey
United Arab Emirates		
United Arab Emirates	Flag of the United Arab Emirates	Emblem of the United Arab Emirates
United Kingdom		
United Kingdom	Royal Standard of the United Kingdom	Coat of arms of the United Kingdom
United Kingdom	Royal Standard of the United Kingdom for use in Scotland	Coat of arms of the United Kingdom for use in Scotland

=== Provincial flags ===
Subdivision	Flag	Coat of arms from which the flag is derived or vice versa
Anguilla		
Anguilla	Flag of Anguilla (1967–1969)	Coat of arms of Anguilla
Aquitaine		
Aquitaine	Flag of Aquitaine	Coat of arms of Aquitaine
Alsace		
Alsace	Flag of Alsace	Coat of arms of Alsace
Astrakhan Oblast		
Astrakhan Oblast	Flag of Astrakhan Oblast	Coat of arms of Astrakhan Oblast
Bavaria		
Bavaria	Flag of Bavaria (alternative)	Coat of arms of Bavaria
British Columbia		
British Columbia	Flag of British Columbia	Coat of arms of British Columbia
Bourgogne-Franche-Comté		
Bourgogne-Franche-Comté	Flag of Bourgogne-Franche-Comté	Coat of arms of Bourgogne-Franche-Comté
Castile and León		
Castile and León	Flag of Castile and León	Coat of arms of Castile and León
Castile-La Mancha		
Castile-La Mancha	Flag of Castile-La Mancha	Coat of arms of Castile–La Mancha
Colorado		
Colorado	Flag of Colorado (1907–1911)	Seal of Colorado
Corsica		
Corsica	Flag of Corsica	Coat of arms of Corsica
Dnipropetrovsk Oblast		
Dnipropetrovsk Oblast	Flag of Dnipropetrovsk Oblast	Coat of arms of Dnipropetrovsk Oblast
England		
England	Royal Banner of England	Royal Arms of England
Flanders		
Flanders	Flag of Flanders	Coat of arms of Flanders
Friuli-Venezia Giulia		
Friuli-Venezia Giulia	Flag of Friuli-Venezia Giulia	Coat of arms of Friuli-Venezia Giulia
Gibraltar		
Gibraltar	Flag of Gibraltar	Coat of arms of Gibraltar
Hong Kong		
Hong Kong	Flag of Hong Kong	Emblem of Hong Kong
Kedah		
Kedah	Flag of Kedah	Coat of arms of Kedah
Lipetsk Oblast		
Lipetsk Oblast	Flag of Lipetsk Oblast	Coat of arms of Lipetsk Oblast
Macau		
Macau	Flag of Macau	Emblem of Macau
Madeira		
Madeira	Flag of Madeira	Coat of arms of Madeira
Maryland		
Maryland	Flag of Maryland	Coat of arms of Maryland
Meru		
Meru	Flag of Meru County	Coat of arms of Meru County
Midi-Pyrénées (Occitania, Languedoc)		
Midi-Pyrénées (Occitania, Languedoc)	Flag of Midi-Pyrénées	Coat of arms of Midi-Pyrénées
Moravian-Silesian Region (Moravia, Silesia)		
Moravian-Silesian Region (Moravia, Silesia)	Flag of Moravian-Silesian Region	Coat of arms of Moravian-Silesian Region
Murcia (Region)		
Murcia (Region)	Flag of Region of Murcia	Coat of arms of Region of Murcia
Navarre		
Navarre	Flag of Navarre (historical)	Coat of arms of Navarre
New Brunswick		
New Brunswick	Flag of New Brunswick	Coat of arms of New Brunswick
Nova Scotia		
Nova Scotia	Flag of Nova Scotia	Coat of arms of Nova Scotia
Pará		
Pará	Flag of Pará	Coat of arms of Pará
Picardy		
Picardy	Flag of Picardy	Coat of arms of Picardy
Pomeranian Voivodeship		
Pomeranian Voivodeship	Flag of Pomeranian Voivodeship	Coat of arms of Pomeranian Voivodeship
Prince Edward Island		
Prince Edward Island	Flag of Prince Edward Island	Coat of arms of Prince Edward Island
Provence-Alpes-Côte d'Azur		
Provence-Alpes-Côte d'Azur	Flag of Provence-Alpes-Côte d'Azur	Coat of arms of Provence-Alpes-Côte d'Azur
Sarawak		
Sarawak	Flag of Sarawak	Coat of arms of Sarawak
Sardinia		
Sardinia	Flag of Sardinia	Coat of arms of Sardinia
Savoy		
Savoy	Flag of Savoy	Coat of arms of Savoy
Scania		
Scania	Flag of Scania	Coat of arms of Scania
Scotland		
Scotland	Royal Standard of Scotland	Royal coat of arms of Scotland
Sicily		
Sicily	Flag of Sicily	Coat of arms of Sicily
Ternopil Oblast		
Ternopil Oblast	Flag of Ternopil Oblast	Coat of arms of Ternopil Oblast
Tula Oblast		
Tula Oblast	Flag of Tula Oblast	Coat of arms of Tula Oblast
Ulyanovsk Oblast		
Ulyanovsk Oblast	Flag of Ulyanovsk Oblast	Coat of arms of Ulyanovsk Oblast
Voronezh Oblast		
Voronezh Oblast	Flag of Voronezh Oblast	Coat of arms of Voronezh Oblast
Wales		
Wales	Flag of Wales	The 1953 Royal Badge of Wales
Wallonia		
Wallonia	Flag of Wallonia	Coat of arms of Wallonia
Washington D.C.		
Washington D.C.	Flag of Washington, D.C.	Coat of arms of the Washington family
Yaroslavl Oblast		
Yaroslavl Oblast	Flag of Yaroslavl Oblast	Coat of arms of Yaroslavl Oblast
Zürich (canton)		
Zürich (canton)	Flag of Zürich	Coat of arms of Zürich

=== County flags ===
Cheshire		
Cheshire	Flag of Cheshire	Coat of arms of Cheshire
Essex		
Essex	Flag of Essex	Coat of arms of Essex
Jönköping County		
Jönköping County	Flag of Jönköping County	Coat of arms of Jönköping County
Kalmar County		
Kalmar County	Flag of Kalmar County	Coat of arms of Kalmar County
Kent		
Kent	Flag of Kent	Coat of arms of Kent
Kronoberg County		
Kronoberg County	Flag of Kronoberg County	Coat of arms of Kronoberg County
Northumberland		
Northumberland	Flag of Northumberland	Coat of arms of Northumberland
Przemyśl County		
Przemyśl County	Flag of Przemyśl County	Coat of arms of Przemyśl County
Sussex		
Sussex	Flag of Sussex	Coat of arms of Sussex
Vestfold og Telemark		
Vestfold og Telemark	Flag of Vestfold and Telemark	Coat of arms of Vestfold and Telemark
Vilnius County		
Vilnius County	Flag of Vilnius County	Coat of arms of Vilnius County
Warwickshire		
Warwickshire	Flag of Warwickshire	Coat of arms of Warwickshire

=== City flags ===
City	Flag	Coat of arms from which the flag is derived or vice versa
Aberdeen		
Aberdeen	Flag of Aberdeen	Coat of arms of Aberdeen
Barcelona		
Barcelona	Flag of Barcelona	Coat of arms of Barcelona
Bari		
Bari	Flag of Bari	Coat of arms of Bari
Belfast		
Belfast	Flag of Belfast	Coat of arms of Belfast
Belgrade		
Belgrade	Flag of Belgrade	Coat of arms of Belgrade
Bodø		
Bodø	Flag of Bodø	Coat of arms of Bodø
Brno		
Brno	Flag of Brno	Coat of arms of Brno
Durham		
Durham	Flag of Durham	Coat of arms of Durham
Dundee		
Dundee	Flag of Dundee	Coat of arms of Dundee
Edinburgh		
Edinburgh	Flag of Edinburgh	Coat of arms of Edinburgh
Florence		
Florence	Flag of Florence	Coat of arms of Florence
Freiburg im Breisgau		
Freiburg im Breisgau	Flag of Freiburg im Breisgau	Coat of arms of Freiburg im Breisgau
Gdańsk		
Gdańsk	Flag of Gdańsk	Coat of arms of Gdańsk
Hamburg		
Hamburg	Flag of Hamburg	Coat of arms of Hamburg
Helsinki		
Helsinki	Flag of Helsinki	Coat of arms of Helsinki
João Pessoa		
João Pessoa	Flag of João Pessoa	Coat of arms of João Pessoa
Kaliningrad		
Kaliningrad	Flag of Kaliningrad	Coat of arms of Kaliningrad
Kremenchuk		
Kremenchuk	Flag of Kremenchuk	Coat of arms of Kremenchuk
Leicester		
Leicester	Flag of Leicester	Coat of arms of Leicester
Lincoln		
Lincoln	Flag of Lincoln	Coat of arms of Lincoln
City of London		
City of London	Flag of the City of London	Coat of arms of the City of London
Lyon		
Lyon	Flag of Lyon	Coat of arms of Lyon
Marseille		
Marseille	Flag of Marseille	Coat of arms of Marseille
Milan		
Milan	Flag of Milan	Coat of arms of Milan
Montreal		
Montreal	Flag of Montreal	Coat of arms of Montreal
Moscow		
Moscow	Flag of Moscow	Coat of arms of Moscow
Naples		
Naples	Flag of Naples	Coat of arms of Naples
Pisa		
Pisa	Flag of Pisa	Coat of arms of Pisa
Portsmouth		
Portsmouth	Flag of Portsmouth	Coat of arms of Portsmouth
Przemyśl		
Przemyśl	Flag of Przemyśl	Coat of arms of Przemyśl
Saint Petersburg		
Saint Petersburg	Flag of Saint Petersburg	Coat of arms of Saint Petersburg
Salvador		
Salvador	Flag of Salvador	Coat of arms of Salvador
St Albans		
St Albans	Flag of St Albans	Coat of arms of St Albans
Strasbourg		
Strasbourg	Flag of Strasbourg	Coat of arms of Strasbourg
Stockholm		
Stockholm	Flag of Stockholm	Coat of arms of Stockholm
Verona		
Verona	Flag of Verona	Coat of arms of Verona
York		
York	Flag of York	Coat of arms of York
Zaragoza		
Zaragoza	Flag of Zaragoza	Coat of arms of Zaragoza

=== Organisation flags ===
Organisation	Flag	Coat of arms from which the flag is derived or vice versa
European Union		
European Union	European flag	Coat of arms of the chairman of the European Union Military Committee
Estonian Defense Forces		
Estonian Defense Forces	Flag of the Estonian Defense Forces	Coat of arms of Estonia
Italian Navy		
Italian Navy	Jack of the Italian Navy	Coat of arms of the Italian Navy
Spanish Navy		
Spanish Navy	Jack of the Spanish Navy	Coat of arms of Spain
Latvian Naval Forces		
Latvian Naval Forces	Ensign of the Latvian Naval Forces	Coat of arms of the Latvian Naval Forces
Republic of China (Taiwan) Navy		
Republic of China (Taiwan) Navy	Jack of the Republic of China Navy (Note: Also flag of Kuomintang.)	National Emblem of the Republic of China
Ukrainian Navy		
Ukrainian Navy	Naval Jack of Ukraine (1992)	Coat of arms of Ukraine
University of Bristol		
University of Bristol	Flag of the University of Bristol	Coat of Arms of the University of Bristol
Bangor University		
Bangor University	Flag of Bangor University	Coat of Arms of Bangor University
University of Cambridge		
University of Cambridge	Flag of the University of Cambridge	Coat of arms of the University of Cambridge
University of London		
University of London	Flag of the University of London	Coat of arms of the University of Cambridge
University of Warwick		
University of Warwick	Flag of the University of Warwick	Coat of Arms of the University of Warwick
