= Picard people =

Picards Chés Picards (Picard)
- Flag of the Picards

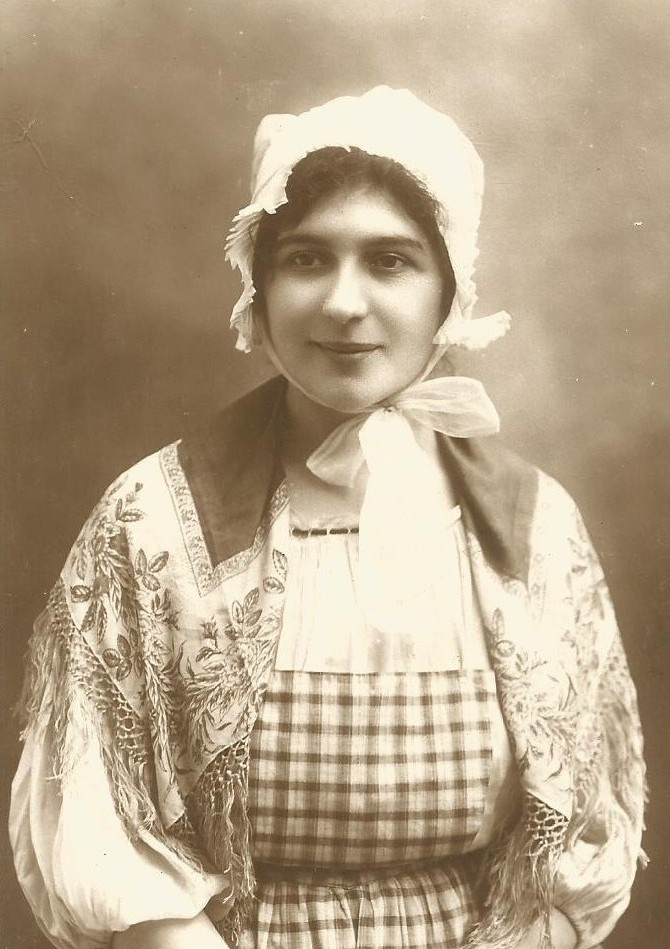
- Picard woman in a traditional dress.

Regions with significant populations
- Picardy
- Picardy (Administrative region): 1,932,422

Languages
- Picard, French

Religion
- Predominantly Roman Catholic; Increasingly irreligious

Related ethnic groups
- Belgae, Walloons, Flemish

- Person: Picard (m), Picarde (f)
- People: Picards
- Language: Picard
- Country: Picardie

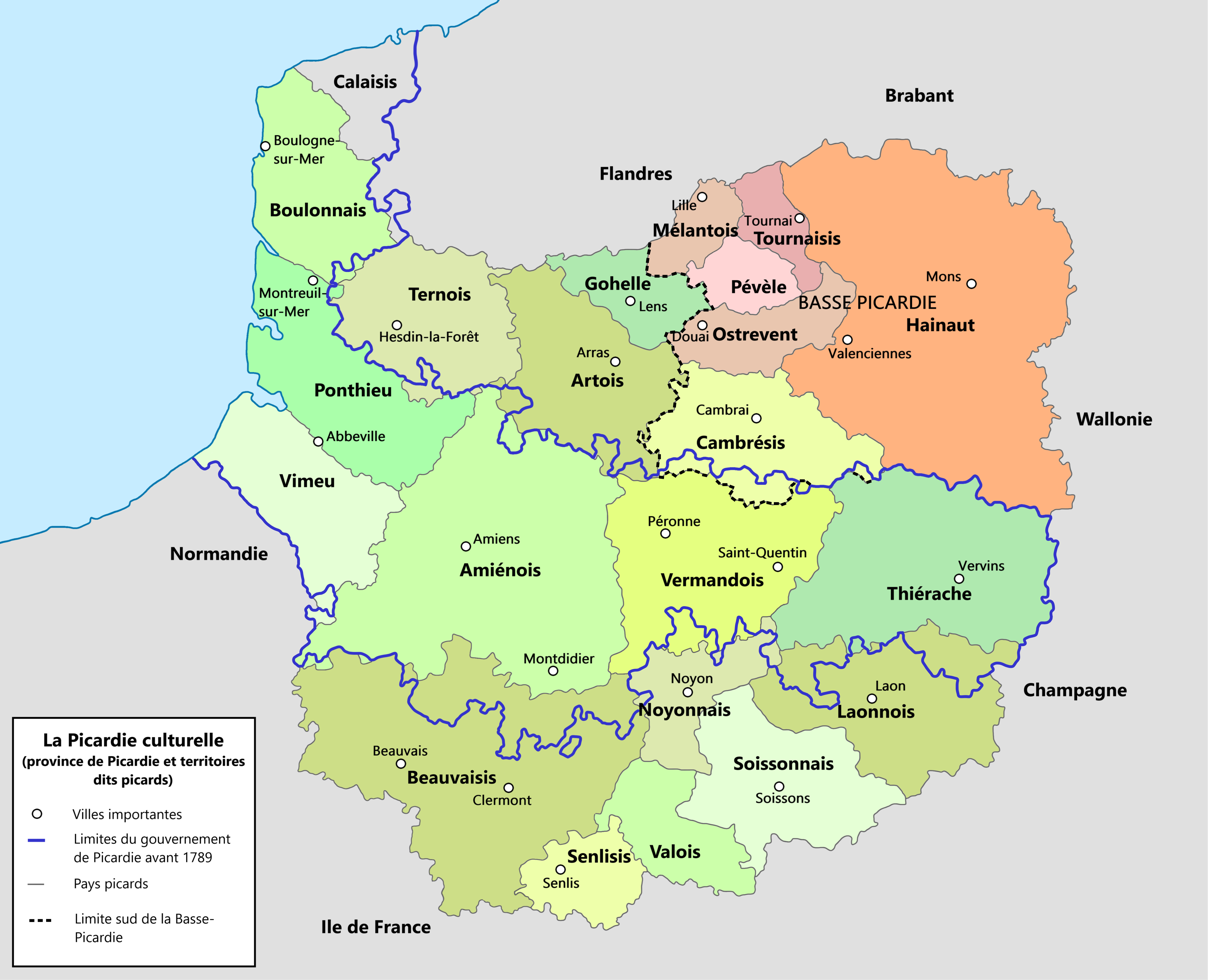
The cultural region of Picardy.

The Picards (/pɪˈkɑːrdz/; Picard: Chés Picards) are a Romance-speaking ethnic group native to the region of Picardy, in northern France and Wallonia, in Belgium.

== Etymology ==
The word 'Picard' derives from the Old French pic referring to a weapon with a long shaft and a pointed metal head, combined with the suffix -ard. The name means "piocheur", in the sense of a plowman or agricultural laborer.

The name appears for the first time during the late 11th century, after the death of "Guillaume le Picard" in 1098, during the First Crusade.

== Culture ==
=== Language ===
The Picard people originally speak the Picard language, a Gallo-Romance language belonging to the langues d'oïl cotinuum.

== Notes and references ==
=== Bibliography ===
- Bertaux, Fernand (1894). Les Artistes picards. E. Lechevalier.
- Debrie, René (1985). Bibliographie d'ethnologie picarde. Université de Picardie. ISBN 2-85925-029-8.
- Duverlie, Dominique (2004). Les Picards face à l'occupation allemande : le département de la Somme du 20 mai 1940 au 3 septembre 1944.
- Goze, Antoine (1842). Familles illustres de Picardie. Caron-Vitet.
- Lomier (1926). Les Picards au Canada. Société d'histoire du Canada.
- de Marsy, Arthur (2018). La Picardie et les Picards au Parlement de Paris, 1400–1417. Hachette. ISBN 9782019180300. (1st ed. 1889)
- Morlet, Marie-Thérèse (1967). Étude d'anthroponymie picarde : les noms de personne en Haute Picardie aux XIIIe, XIVe, XVe siècles. Musée de Picardie.
- Prétrot, Gérard (2017). Émigration picarde au Québec. Edilivre. ISBN 9782414139897.
- Rossier, Louis (1861). Histoire des Protestants de Picardie, particulièrement de ceux du département de la Somme. Grassart.
- Beauvy, François (1990). Dictionnaire picard des parlers et traditions du Beauvaisis. Eklitra LXIII.
