= Cuisine of Picardy =

Foods of the Picardy region of France

The administrative region of Picardy until 2016

The cuisine of Picardy, also known as Picard cuisine (French: la cuisine Picarde) refers to foods and food products from different departments of the Picardy region of France, including Aisne, Oise, and Somme. While sharing many similarities (like Maroilles cheese) with the Nord-Pas-de-Calais region, with which Picardy merged into Hauts-de-France in 2016, its cuisine remains unique and is quite different.

Given the presence of lush pastures in the region, dairy products play a prominent role in the local cuisine. Many well-known dishes such as ficelle Picarde, flamiche aux Poireaux, and tarte au Maroilles use cheese, cream, and milk as their main ingredients.

While Picardy is not particularly famous for its seafood, mussels, shrimp, and fish are commonly used in ragouts and gratins. Poultry, pork, and beef are staples of the region and are commonly prepared as stews or roast.

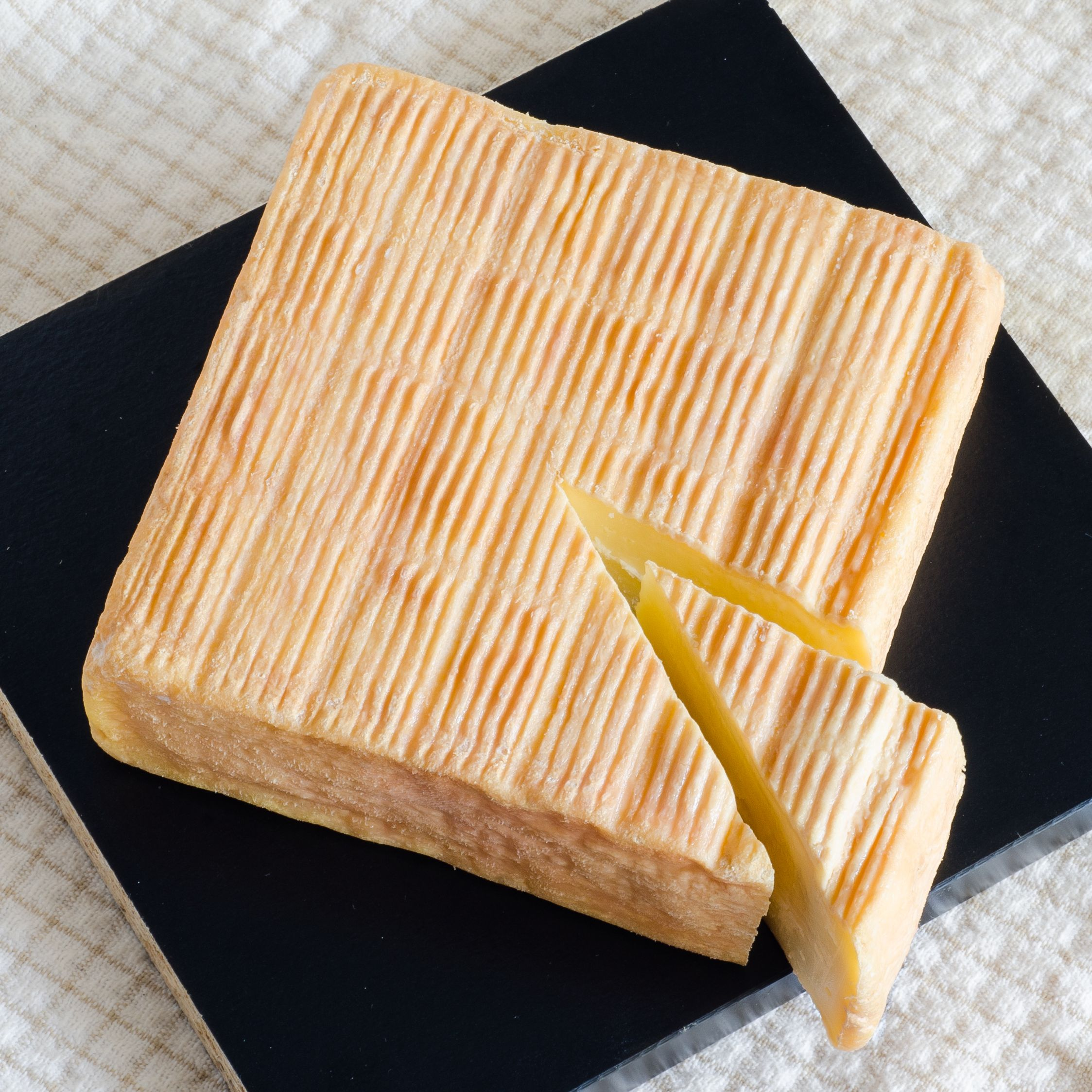
Maroilles cheese

Some of the specialties from this cuisine include Maroilles cheese, Picardy champagne, and Prés salés de la baie lamb. The specialties of the south of Picardy such as pommeau, Calvados, and Neufchâtel cheese are better known outside of the region. The widely known Chantilly cream is also from the Chantilly region of Picardy.

== Products and dishes ==
Main dishes

- Amiens andouillettes - A variety of andouillette sausage from Amiens made from pork intestines and stomach
- Amiens beignet - A savory fritter from Amiens
- Bisteux - A type of potato tarte
- Caghuse - Braised pork and onions in wine or cider
- Ficelle picarde - Savory crêpe stuffed with mushroom duxelle, cheese and cream
- Flamiche aux poireaux - A leek tart from Picardy made with a shortcrust base
- Gratin picard - A potato dish with cream, butter, and often cheese or bacon
- Noix du Beauvaisis - parsley ham pâté in jelly
- Lapin au cidre - Rabbit braised in cider and served with a creamy sauce
- Pâté de canard d'Amiens - a type of duck pâté specific to Picardy
- Rissoles de Coucy - Pastries filled with meat or sweet fillings from the Coucy region
- Soupe des hortillons - A vegetable soup made Amiens usually with leeks, carrots, potatoes, and herbs

Pastries

- Cugnot - A traditional bread similar to brioche from the Picardy region
- Gâteau battu - A light and tall cake from Picardy
- Galopin - A small individual cake made with a rich batter from Picardy

Meats

- Prés salés de la baie de Somme lamb
- Angus beef

Spices

- Herbes séchées de la baie de Somme - Dried wild herbs mixture native to Somme
- Hallencourt camelina oil
- Saffron
- Saffron cider vinegar

Apéritifs

- Apéritif de Picardie verte
- Claret
- Hypocras à la framboise - Raspberry-flavored spiced wine
- Moretum
- Picardy Poiret
- Hydromel moelleux

Wines

- Picardy Champagne
- Terramesnil white and red wines

Ciders

- Cidre du pays de Bray picard
- Vimeu cider
- Thiérache cider

Cheese

- Choquoise
- Fromage de chèvre fermier de Belleuse
- Dauphin
- Manicamp
- Petit Gerberoy
- Rollot
- Tomme au foin
- Tommes d'Éplessier

== See also ==
- Picardy region
- French wines
- Haute cuisine
- Cuisine and specialties of Nord-Pas-de-Calais

== Sources ==
- "La Picardie". Cuisine du terroir. Saveurs d'Annie (in French). Artémis. 2006. ISBN 978-2-84416-480-3.
- Debrie, J.; Debrie, R.; Pigrant, R. (1977). Mœurs épulaires picardes [Food customs of Picardy] (in French). FeniXX rédition numérique. ISBN 978-2-402-64932-2.
