= Coat of arms of the University of Cambridge =

Versions
- The banner of arms, which serves as the University flag
- Armiger: University of Cambridge
- Adopted: 1583
- Shield: Gules, on a cross ermine between four lions passant guardant or, a Bible lying fesseways of the field, clasped and garnished of the third, the clasps in base
- Motto: Hinc lucem et pocula sacra (not affixed)
- Use: Formal, ceremonial or informal contexts, degrees and official documents, competitions

The coat of arms of the University of Cambridge in Cambridge, England, is blazoned: Gules, on a cross ermine between four lions passant guardant Or, a Bible lying fesseways of the field, clasped and garnished of the third, the clasps in base. Or, in English:

On a red background, a cross of ermine fur between four gold lions walking but with one fore-leg raised, and facing the observer. These lions must always face the left-hand edge of the page or item on which the arms are displayed (which means they are facing right, heraldically speaking). On the centre of the cross is a closed book with its spine horizontal and with clasps and decoration, the clasps pointing downward.

— University of Cambridge Communications Team

The arms were granted at the 1573 visitation of the County of Cambridge undertaken by Robert Cooke, the then Clarenceux King of Arms, and a graduate of St John's College. The lions represent the university's royal patronage, the ermine represents dignity, and the Bible on the cross represents both knowledge and the Christian faith.

The motto is not a fixed or necessary component of the arms, but the motto generally used by the university is Hinc lucem et pocula sacra, Latin for "From here, light and sacred draughts". This derives from an emblem traditionally used by the University Press, featuring the alma mater ("nourishing mother") of Cambridge with a sun in one hand, representing enlightenment, and in the other a cup collecting droplets from the sky, representing spiritual sustenance.

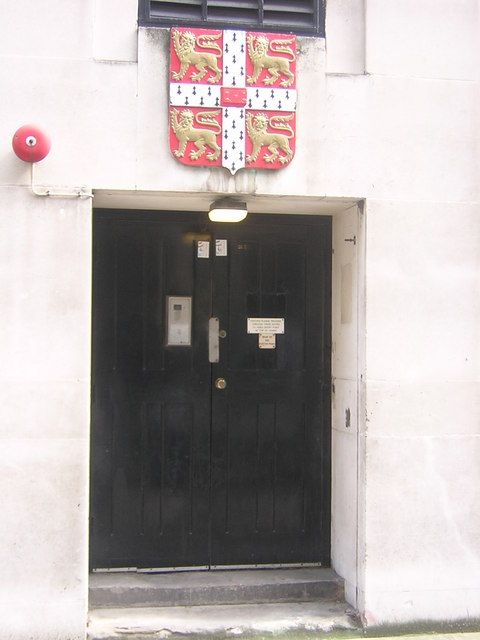
The university's arms above the back door to Bentley House, formerly the University Press's London office

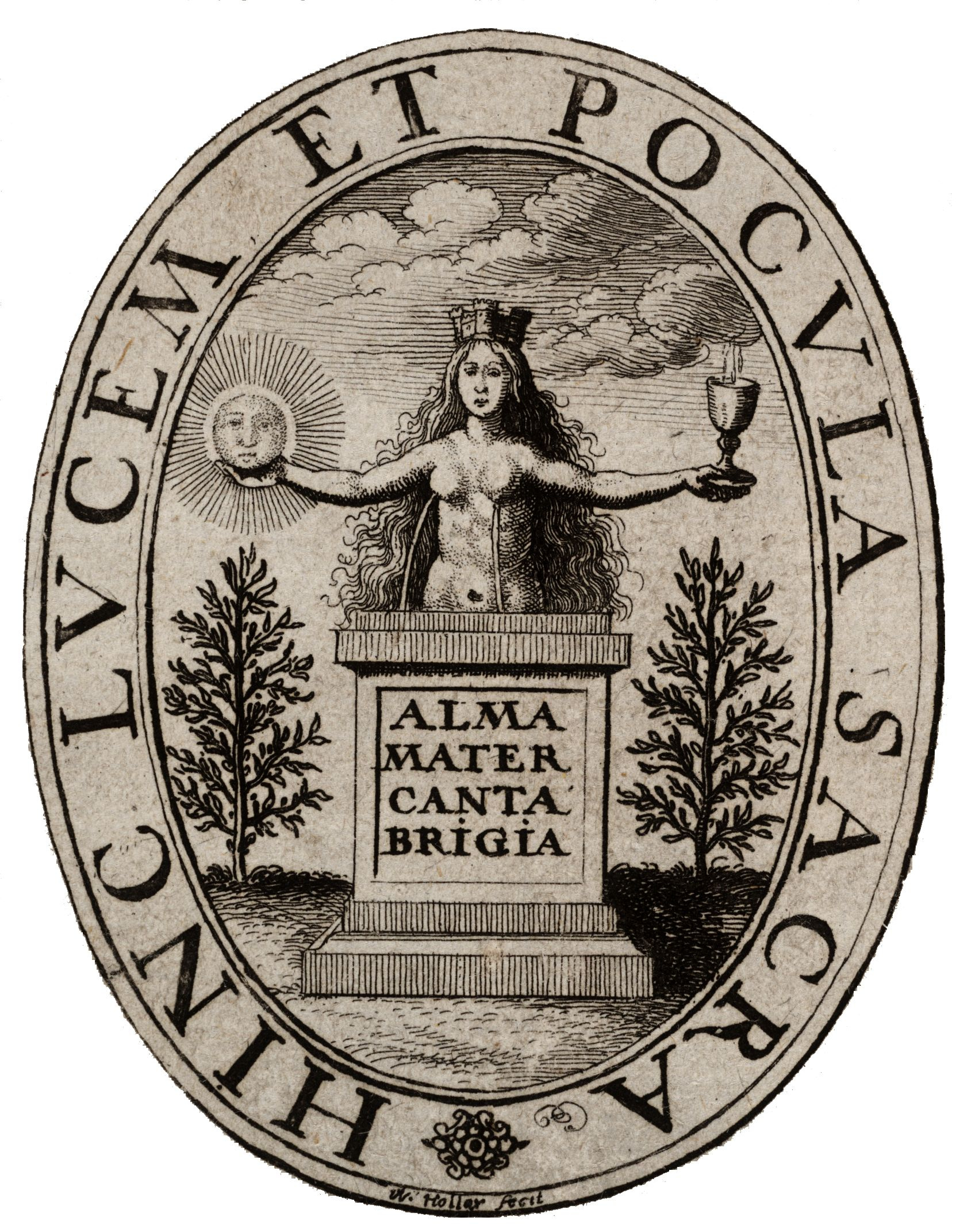
The University Press's emblem

== See also ==
- Armorial of UK universities
- University of Cambridge
