= Flamiche =

French savoury tart

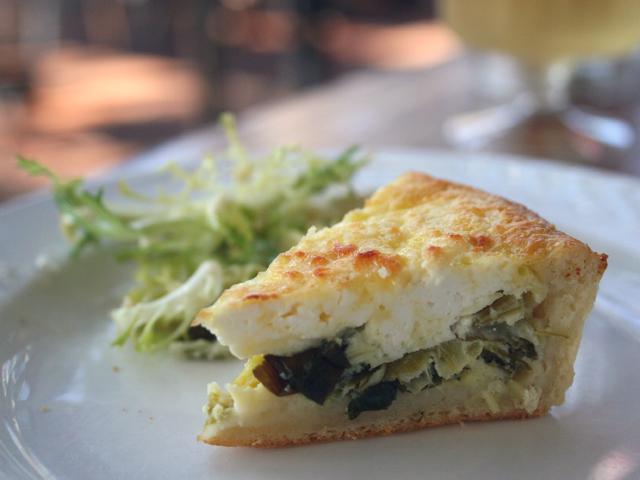
- Flamiche picarde
- Type: Pie
- Place of origin: France
- Region or state: Alsace; Burgundy; Picardy
- Main ingredients: Leeks, cream

Flamiche (French: [fla.miʃ]) is a French savoury tart, originating in north-west France. It dates to medieval times and originally was a kind of galette, but in its modern version is a tart made with leeks and cream.

== Etymology ==
Two possible derivations have been advanced for the word flamiche: either that it comes from flamme, 'flame', as the dish was traditionally cooked in a wood-burning oven, or that it is a corruption of vlamiche – Flemish (the dish being native to north-west France, close to the border with Flanders).

== History ==
The term dates from medieval times. Jean Froissart's Chronicles, dating from the 14th century, mention people eating "a little torte in the manner of a flamiche or beignet to comfort their stomachs". In his Dictionarie of the French and English Tongues (1611), Randle Cotgrave applies the term to "a cake made of butter, cheese, flower, and yolkes of egges". (Note: Cotgrave says that the term is also used "in Paris and thereabouts" for "a kind of better bread then ordinarie, reserued for the Maisters and Mistresses own mouthes".)

The 18th-century scholar Legrand d'Aussy described the flamiche as it was made in his time: "It is a kind of galette made with baker's dough. It is rolled out with a rolling pin and put in the oven while the wood is burning. As soon as it has been thoroughly heated, it is taken out of the oven and spread with butter. It is eaten as soon as it comes out of the oven". In his Encyclopédie méthodique (1782) Jacques Lacombe describes a flamiche as "A kind of pastry made with salty fatty cheese, butter, eggs, flour & seasoning. The dough is cut into thick pieces of two fingers, and baked in the oven".

== Modern version ==
As late as the 1880s there is no mention of leeks in the definition in the Dictionnaire de la langue française: "Name, in some provinces, of a pastry made of cheese, butter and eggs", but in 1910 a French journal described a flamiche as "a flour dough, buttered inside with leeks cut into small pieces", originating in Péronne, Somme. In Larousse Gastronomique (1938), Prosper Montagné wrote, "Nowadays the name flamiche is given to a kind of leek tart made in Burgundy and Picardy." In 1998, Simon Hopkinson wrote of "La Flamiche aux Poireaux: a buttery leek pie – a famed speciality of Alsatian cookery". Montagné does not specify the type of pastry to be used; Hopkinson uses puff; Elizabeth David suggests a crumbly shortcrust; Anne Willan uses a yeast dough similar to that used in pizzas. Clarissa Dickson Wright specifies a brioche dough, and although her recipe contains leeks, she comments that flamiche "can be filled with whatever you like".

== See also ==
- Quiche

== Sources ==
- Cotgrave, Randle (1611). A Dictionarie of the French and English Tongues. London: A. Islip. OCLC 1044380136.
- David, Elizabeth (2008) [1960]. French Provincial Cooking. London: Folio Society. OCLC 809349711.
- Froissart, Jean (1574). Histoire et chronique. Paris: Olivier de Pierre L'Huillie. OCLC 1046053523.
- Hopkinson, Simon (1998). Gammon and Spinach and Other Recipes. London: Macmillan. ISBN 978-0-33-373585-5.
- Lacombe, Jacques (1782). Arts et métiers mecaniques. Paris: Panckoucke. OCLC 1040009730.
- Littré, Émile (1883). Dictionnaire de la langue française. Paris: Hachette. OCLC 697603655.
- Montagné, Prosper (1976) [1938]. Larousse Gastronomique. London: Hamlyn. ISBN 978-0-600-02352-4. OCLC 1285641881.
- Paterson, Jennifer; Clarissa Dickson Wright (1996). Two Fat Ladies. London: Ebury Press. ISBN 978-0-09-185896-4.
- Willan, Anne (2007). The Country Cooking of France. San Francisco: Chronicle. ISBN 978-0-81-184646-2.
