= Picardy =

Picardy Picardie
- Region of France
- Flag Coat of arms

- Coordinates: 49°30′N 2°50′E
- Country: France
- Dissolved: 1 January 2016
- Prefecture: Amiens
- Departments: 3: Aisne (02); Oise (60); Somme (80)

Area
  - Total: 19,399 km^{2} (7,490 sq mi)

Population (2016)
  - Total: 1,932,422
  - Density: 99.615/km^{2} (258.00/sq mi)
- Demonym: Picards

GDP
  - Total: €60.808 billion (2024)
  - Per capita: €31,870 (2024)
- Time zone: UTC+01:00 (CET)
  - Summer (DST): UTC+02:00 (CEST)
- ISO 3166 code: FR-S
- NUTS Region: FR2
- Website: cr-picardie.fr

Picardy (/ˈpɪkərdi/; Picard and French: Picardie, French: [pikaʁdi], Picard: [piˈkaʀdi]; West Flemish and Dutch: Picardië) is a historical and cultural territory and a former administrative region located in northern France. The first mentions of this province date to the Middle Ages: it gained its first official recognition in the 13th century through the nation of Picardy at the University of Paris and entered French administration in the 14th century.

Unlike regions such as Normandy, Brittany, or Champagne, Picardy was never established as a duchy, county, or principality. Its boundaries fluctuated over the centuries due to the political instability in the area it covered. Since 1 January 2016, it has been part of the new region of Hauts-de-France.

The first geographic description of Picardy appeared in the late central Middle Ages, including the bishoprics of Amiens, Beauvais, Arras, Tournai, and Thérouanne. In the late Middle Ages, it also encompassed Saint-Quentin, Douai, Abbeville, Béthune, Clermont, and other towns such as Noyon, Valenciennes, Boulogne-sur-Mer, Hesdin, and Laon. At that time, Picardy was divided into Upper and Lower Picardy: Upper Picardy was closer to Île-de-France, while Lower Picardy, which Barthélemy the Englishman referred to as Hainaut, was closer to Flanders and Brabant.

During the ancien régime, Picardy was generally defined by thirteen traditional regions, still divided into Upper and Lower Picardy: the former grouping inland areas and the latter, coastal areas. It was divided between the governments of Picardy and Île-de-France. The government of Picardy covered the northern half of Upper Picardy, while the government of Île-de-France held the southern half, including towns such as Beauvais, Noyon, and Laon. This description of Picardy, seen in 19th and 20th-century records from the Society of Antiquaries of Picardy and the Historical Society of Upper Picardy, extended from Senlis to Calais, from Soissons and Laon to Abbeville and Boulogne-sur-Mer.

Historians and geographers such as Robert Fossier, Albert Demangeon, and Philippe Pinchemel replaced the idea of the ancien régime Picardy with the notion of an ethnic Picardy, identified particularly by the Picard language. This ethnic Picardy would include places like Senlis and Soissons, which popular tradition historically associated with Picardy due to their dialect. The northern boundary was marked by the linguistic border with Flemish, thus extending to Calais and Tournai.

In the 20th century, geographer Albert Demangeon demonstrated the existence of a geographic Picardy through what he called the "Picard plain", a vast chalk plain stretching from Beauvais to Arras, from Cambrai and Laon to Abbeville and the Boulogne region.

From 1972 to 2015, a region of the same name was created, bringing together the three departments of Somme, Oise, and Aisne, thus encompassing most of Picardy as defined in the Ancien Régime.

Today, Picardy, in its various definitions, is largely contained within the Hauts-de-France region and comprises five departments. Part of linguistic Picardy is in the Wallonia region of Belgium, in the Hainaut Province, and a small portion of historic Beauvais is in the northern part of the Val-d'Oise department, around Beaumont-sur-Oise and L'Isle-Adam.

== History ==
Map of the historical extent of Picardy

The historical province of Picardy stretched from Senlis to Calais via the main parts of the Oise and Aisne departments, the whole of the Somme department and the west of the Pas-de-Calais department. The province of Artois (Arras area) separated Picardy from French Flanders.

=== Middle Ages ===
From the 5th century, the area formed part of the Frankish Empire and, in the feudal period, it encompassed the six countships of Boulogne, Montreuil, Ponthieu, Amiénois, Vermandois and Laonnois. In accordance with the provisions of the 843 Treaty of Verdun, the region became part of West Francia, the later Kingdom of France.

The name "Picardy" derives from the Old French pic, meaning "pike", the characteristic weapon used by people from this region in ancient times. The term "Picardy" was first used in the early 13th century, during which time the name applied to all lands where the Picard language was spoken including territories from Paris to the Netherlands. In the Latin Quarter of Paris, people identified a "Picard Nation" (Nation Picarde) of students at Sorbonne University, most of whom actually came from Flanders. During the Hundred Years' War, Picardy was the centre of the Jacquerie peasant revolt in 1358.

Beginning in 1419, the Picardy counties (Boulogne, Ponthieu, Amiens, Vermandois) were gradually acquired by the Burgundian duke Philip the Good, acquisitions confirmed by King Charles VII of France at the 1435 Congress of Arras. In 1477, King Louis XI of France led an army and occupied key towns in Picardy. By the end of 1477, Louis would control all of Picardy and most of Artois.

=== Modern era ===
In the 15th century, the government (military region) of Picardy was created. This became a new administrative region of France, separate from what was historically defined as Picardy. The new Picardy included the Somme département, the northern half of the Aisne département and a small fringe in the north of the Oise département.

In 1557, Picardy was invaded by Habsburg forces under the command of Emmanuel Philibert, Duke of Savoy. After a seventeen-day siege, St. Quentin was ransacked, while Noyon was burned by the Habsburg army.

In the early 18th century, an infectious disease similar to English sweat originated from the region and spread across France. It was called Suette des picards or Picardy sweat.

Sugar beet was introduced by Napoleon I during the Napoleonic Wars in the 19th century in order to counter the United Kingdom which had seized the sugar islands possessed by France in the Caribbean. The sugar industry has continued to play a prominent role in the economy of the region.

One of the most significant historical events to occur in Picardy was the series of battles fought along the Somme during World War I. From September 1914 to August 1918, four major battles, including the Battle of the Somme, were fought by British, Commonwealth, French and German forces in the fields of Northern Picardy.

=== Picardy today ===
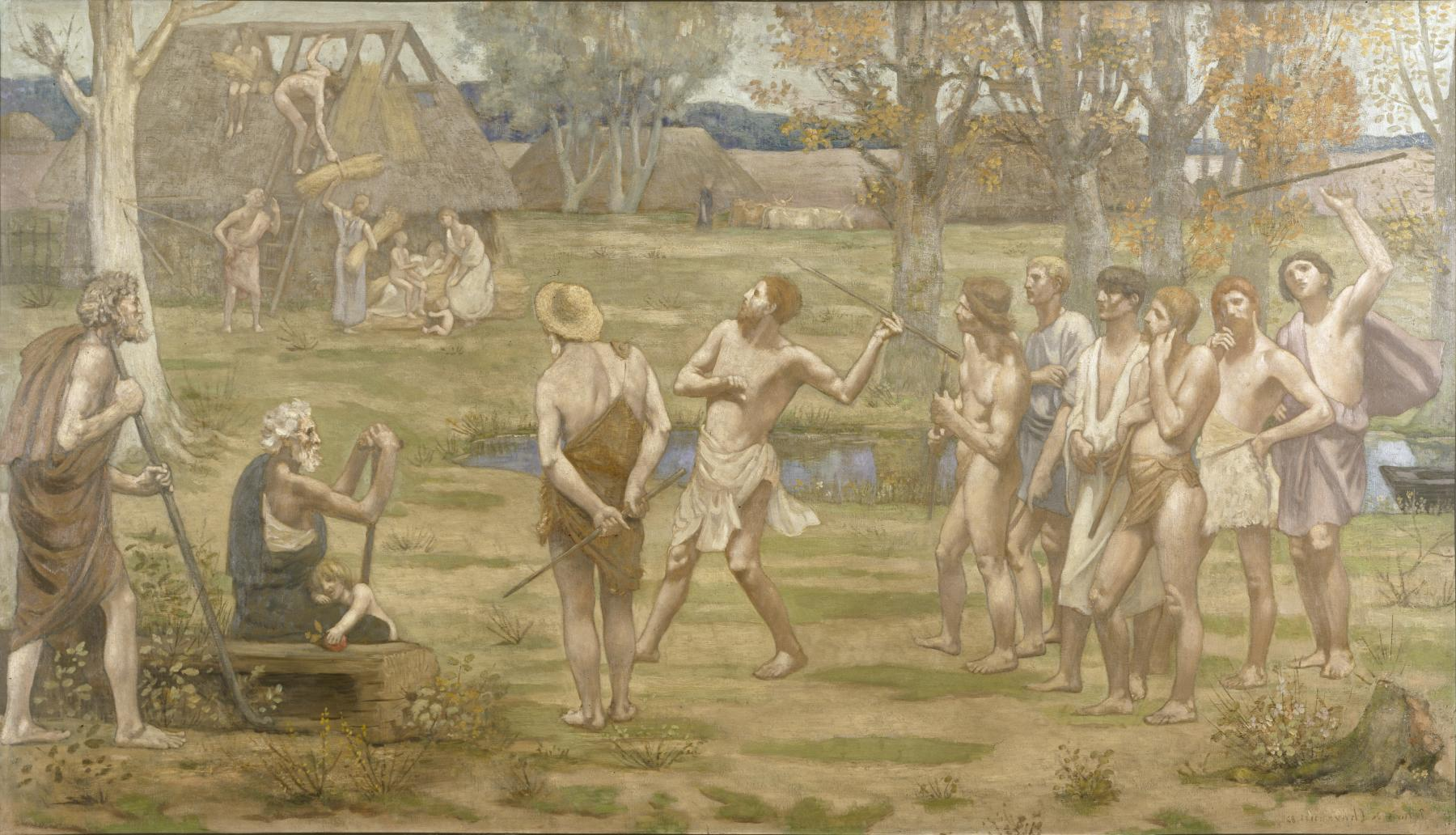
This painting by Pierre Puvis de Chavannes recalls the "Golden Age" in the history of the province of Picardy. The Walters Art Museum.

In 2009, the Regional Committee for local government reform proposed to reduce the number of French regions and cancel additions of new regions in the near future. Picardy would have disappeared and each department would have joined a nearby region. The Oise would have been incorporated in the Île-de-France, the Somme would have been incorporated in the Nord-Pas-de-Calais and Aisne would have been incorporated in the Champagne-Ardenne. The vast majority of Picards were opposed to this proposal and it was scrapped in 2010 (see newspaper: "Courrier Picard").

Today, the modern region of Picardy no longer includes the coastline from Berck to Calais, via Boulogne (Boulonais), that is now in the Nord-Pas-de-Calais region but does incorporate the pays of Beauvaisis, Valois, Noyonnais, Laonnois, Soissonnais, Omois among other departments of France. The older definition of Picardy survives in the name of the Picard language which applies not only to the dialects of Picardy proper but also to the Romance dialects spoken in the Nord-Pas de Calais region, north of Picardy proper, and parts of the Belgian province of Hainaut.

== Geography ==
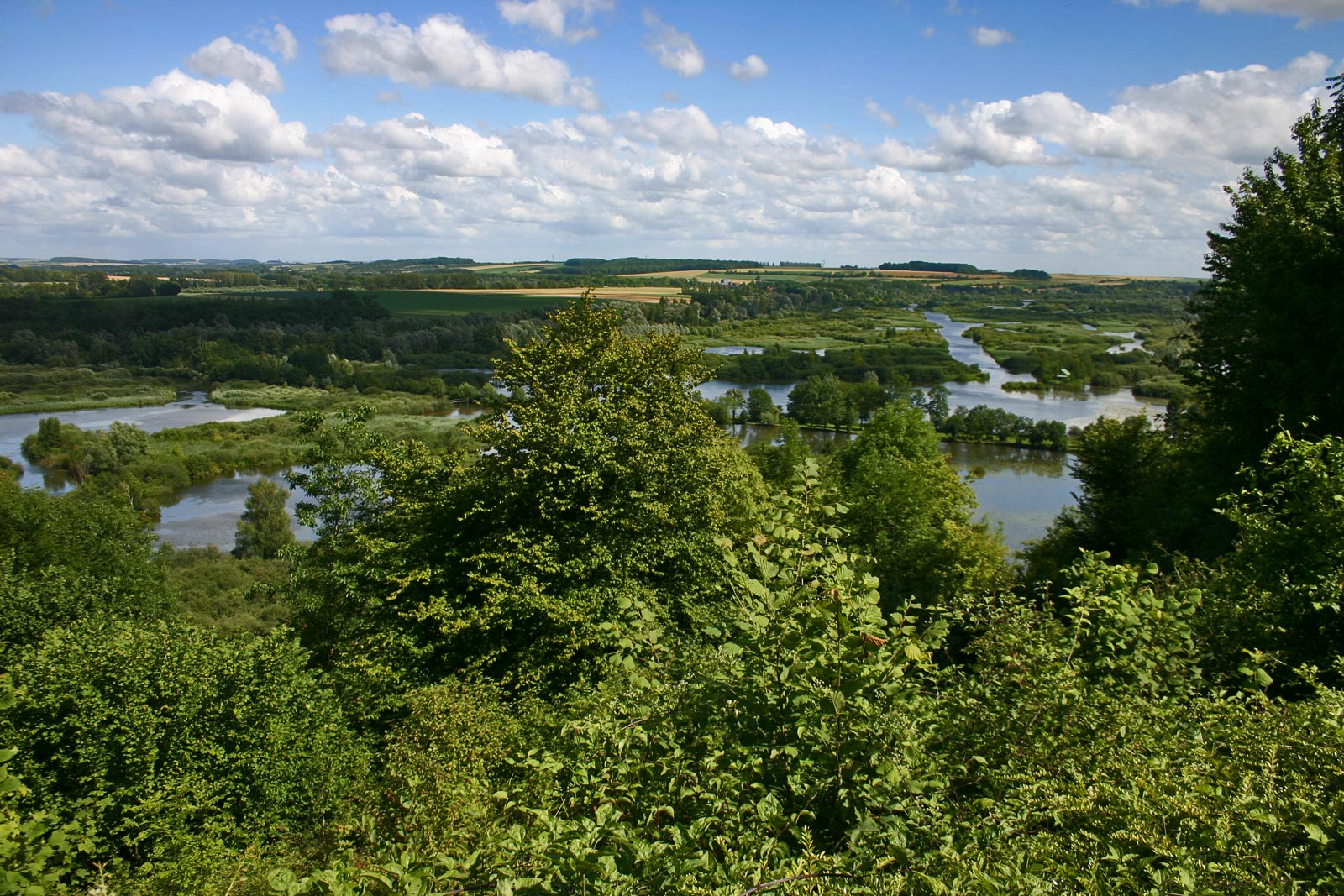
Landscape in Picardy

Between the 1990 and 1999 censuses, the population of Oise increased 0.61% per year, almost twice as fast as France as a whole. Meanwhile the Aisne department lost inhabitants, and the Somme barely grew with a 0.16% growth per year. Today, 41.3% of the population of Picardy live inside the Oise department.

Picardy stretches from the long sand beaches of the Somme estuary in the west to the vast forests and pastures of the Thiérache in the east to Chantilly and Pierrefonds near the Paris Area and vineyards of the border with Champagne to the south.

== Administration ==
The president of the regional council prior to its abolition in 2015 was Claude Gewerc, a Socialist who had been in office since 2004. That year he defeated longtime UDF incumbent Gilles de Robien.

Since 2008, the mayor of the city of Amiens, the regional capital, has been Socialist Gilles Demailly. He defeated longtime mayor Gilles de Robien of the New Centre party.

== Language and culture ==
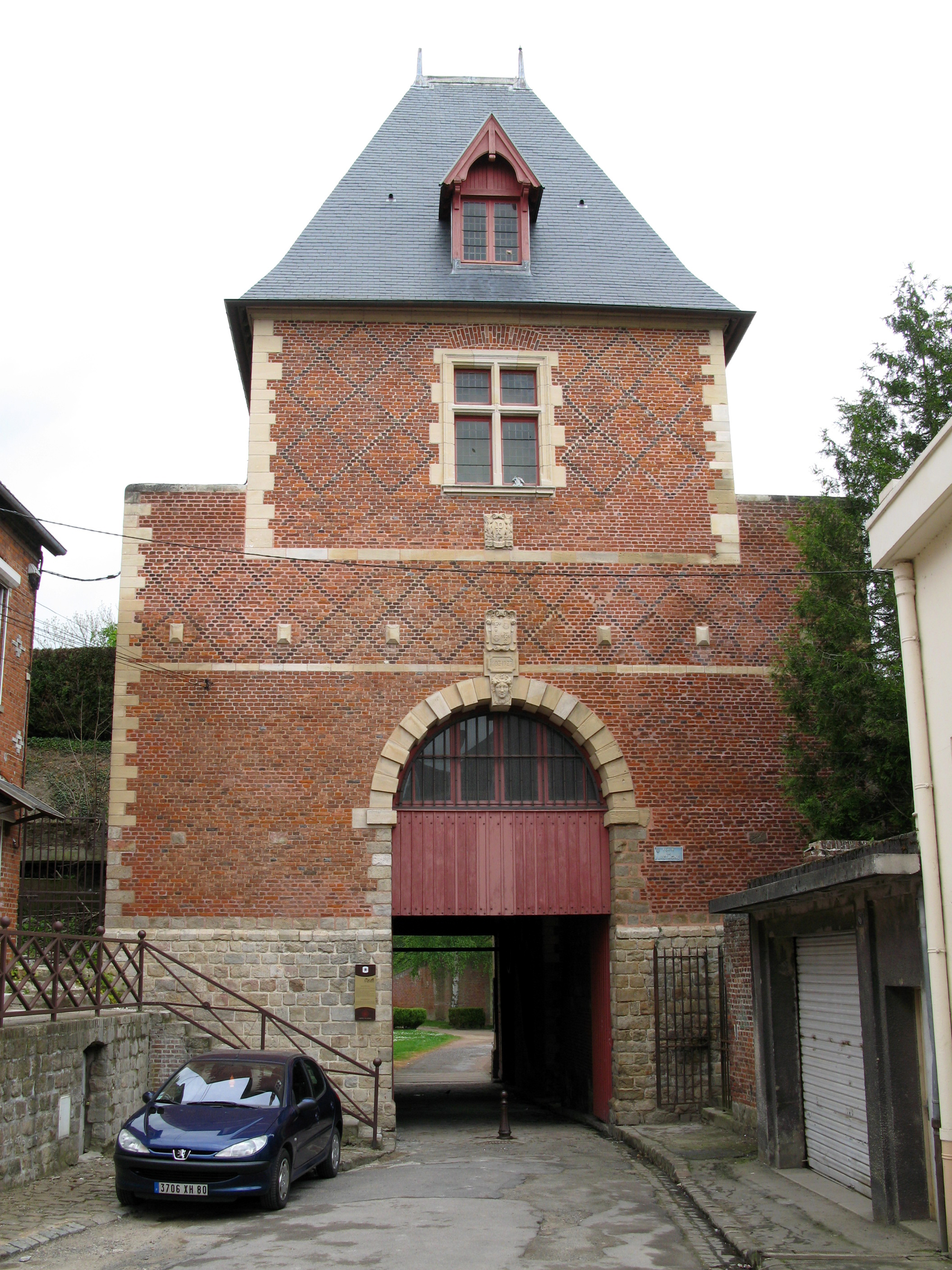
Distinctive brick building style demonstrated on a monument in the Somme, Picardy

Historically, the region of Picardy has a strong and proud cultural identity. The Picard (local inhabitants and traditionally speakers of the Picard language) cultural heritage includes Gothic churches (Amiens and Beauvais cathedrals or Saint-Quentin basilica), local cuisine (including ficelle picarde, flamiche aux poireaux, tarte au maroilles), beer (including from Péronne's de Clercq brewery) and traditional games and sports, such as the longue paume (ancestor of tennis), as well as danses picardes and its own bagpipes, called the pipasso.

The villages of Picardy have a distinct character, with their houses made of red bricks, often accented with a "lace" of white bricks. A minority of people still speak the Picard language, one of the languages of France, which is also spoken in Artois (Nord-Pas de Calais région). "P'tit quinquin", a Picard song, is a symbol of the local culture (and of that of Artois).

Picardy is arguably the birthplace of Gothic architecture, housing six of the world's greatest examples of Gothic cathedrals, which span the history of Gothic architecture in its entirety. Amiens Cathedral, standing as the largest cathedral in Europe, which according to John Ruskin is the "Pantheon of Gothic architecture", could house Notre-Dame de Paris twice over. It was built in as little as 50 years. Picardy also holds the tallest transept in the history of the Gothic period; this transept is located in Saint-Pierre cathedral in Beauvais, Oise.

The Museum of Picardy in Amiens, built between 1855 and 1867, houses a vast array of great works, spanning the centuries and ranging from archaeology from ancient Greece and Egypt to modern works of Pablo Picasso. The museum was closed until the end of 2019 for building work.

== Major cities ==
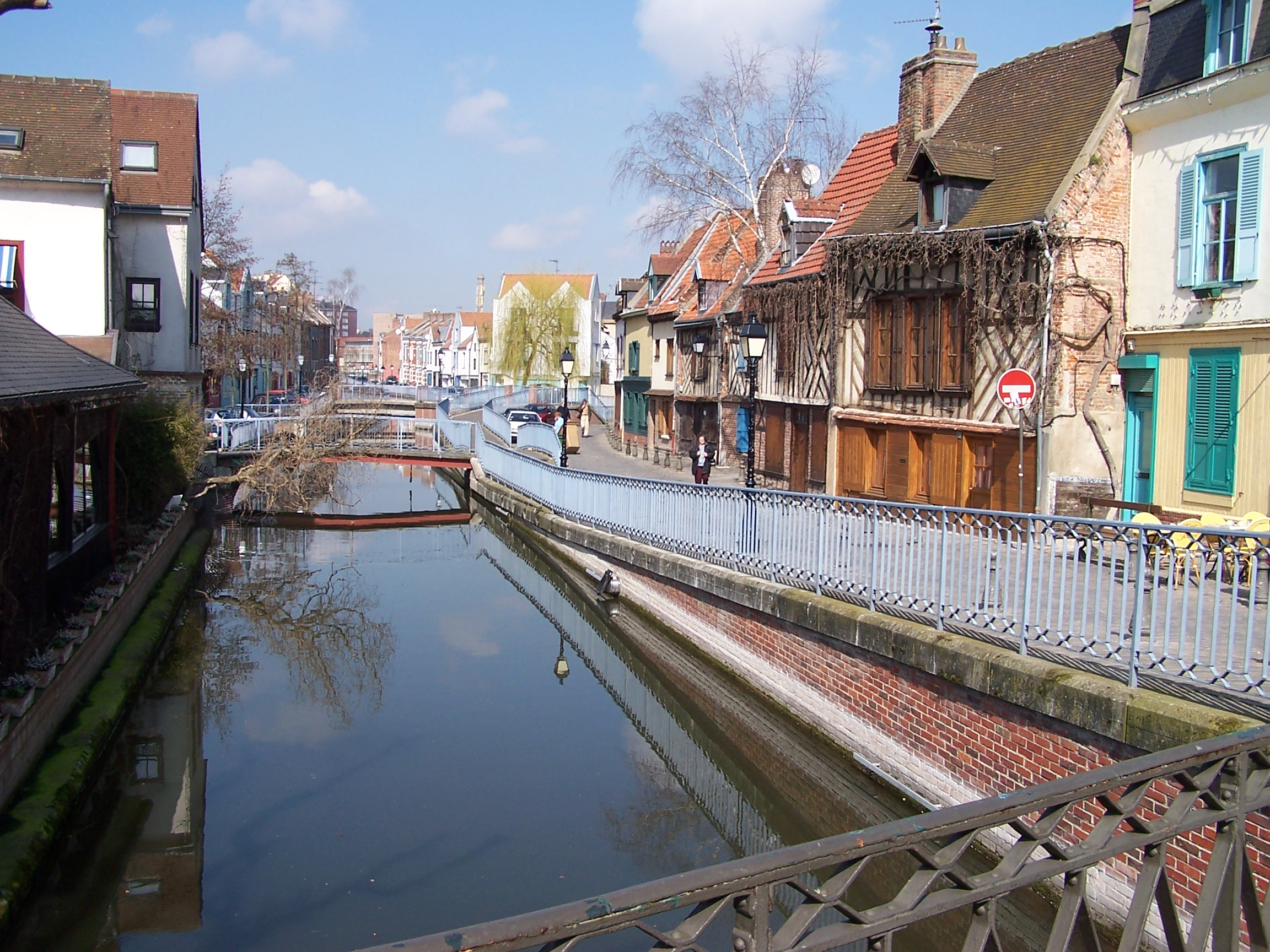
Amiens

- Abbeville
- Amiens
- Beauvais
- Compiègne
- Péronne
- Creil
- Laon
- Saint-Quentin
- Soissons
- Senlis

== In popular culture ==
- The song "Roses of Picardy" is a ballad written in 1916 during World War I. In 1927, the song title was used as the title of the silent British film of the same name.
- Picardy is one of the minor characters in the Japanese manga series Hetalia: Axis Powers.
- The French army song "Reveillez-vous picards" ( "picards awaken") was originally a rally song used by Charles the Bold's picard mercenaries.

== See also ==
- War memorials in the Aisne region of Picardy
- War memorials in the Oise region of Picardy
- War memorials in the Eastern Somme
- War memorials in the Western Somme
- Picard (surname), surname; lists other similar surnames associated with Picardy

== Bibliography ==
- Potter, David (1993). War and Government in the French Provinces: Picardy 1470-1560. Cambridge University Press. ISBN 9780521431897.
