= Flag of Warwickshire =

Flag of the historic county of Warwickshire in England

Warwickshire
- Proportion: 3:5
- Adopted: 15 August 2016
- Design: A white bear and white ragged staff centred on a red field
- Designed by: Traditional

The Warwickshire flag is the flag of the historic county of Warwickshire in England. It was registered with the Flag Institute in August 2016. The flag was registered as a result of a campaign that secured the support of a dozen county organisations plus the sanction of both the Lord Lieutenant and the High Sheriff.

== Design ==
The flag shows a bear and ragged Staff, a heraldic emblem associated with the Earldom of Warwick, in white on a red field.

=== Colours ===
The colours of the flag of Warwickshire are:

| Scheme | Red | White |
|---|---|---|
| Pantone (paper) | 186 C | Safe |
| HEX | #C8102E | #FFFFFF |
| CMYK | 0, 100, 80, 5 | 0, 0, 0, 0 |
| RGB | 200, 16, 46 | 255, 255, 255 |

== History ==
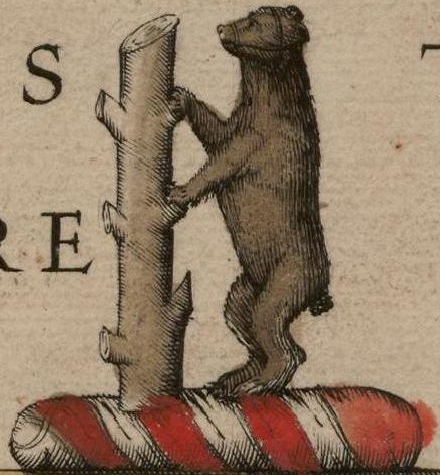
The bear and ragged staff as depicted in John Speed's c. 1611 map of the county

The design features the traditional bear and ragged staff used in the county since the Middle Ages as a symbol of the Earls of Warwick. The first recorded use of the two symbols was by the Beauchamp family, who became the Earls of Warwick in 1268, as a seal. They were initially used separately, and the earliest known appearance of them together was on a bed of black cloth embroidered with a gold bear and silver staff owned by Thomas de Beauchamp, 12th Earl of Warwick (1338–1401). The bear and ragged staff appear in the same arrangement as the flag in John Speed's 1611 map of the county.

The current holders of the title of Earl of Warwick, the Greville family, were granted the symbol of their predecessors, a "bear erect argent, muzzled gules, supporting a ragged staff of the first", shortly after being given the title in 1759. This crest is still used by the earls today. Over the centuries, however, the design has also become associated with the wider county. For example, the 1st Warwickshire Militia regiment, first raised in 1759, used the symbol. Many other organisations in the county followed in adopting the bear and ragged staff, including Warwickshire Constabulary (established in 1857), Warwickshire County Cricket Club (current club established in 1882) and Warwickshire County Council (established in 1889). The design of the flag lacks the chains and the muzzle on the bear, commonly found in old depictions of the emblem.

=== Modern flag ===
Warwickshire council began using a seal with a bear and ragged staff in 1889, and were awarded a red and white coat of arms with the same design in 1931. This led to it being used as a symbol for many Warwickshire-based organisations, such as sports clubs. It was the obvious choice when the campaign for Warwickshire to have a flag began in 2014, on the back of many other counties voting to have their own flags. When a design was drawn up, it ditched the bear's muzzle and chains that had been present on the council arms. Many local historical counties supported this design, and when it came time for registration, the Flag Institute changed the bear to be in a more commanding pose.

== See also ==
- Flag of Kent
