= Vaïsse =

Vaïsse is a surname. Notable people with the surname include:

- Claude-Marius Vaïsse (1799–1864), French politician
- Justin Vaïsse (born 1973), French historian and intellectual
- Martin Vaïsse (born 1987), French tennis player
- Maurice Vaïsse (born 1942), French historian
