= Flag and coat of arms of Picardy =

Flag of Picardie

Coat of arms of Picardy

The coat of arms of Picardy quarters the old royal coat of arms of France (blue with three gold fleurs-de-lis) with three red lions on silver. The flag looks the same but in rectangular form, it is a banner of arms.

== History ==
The origin of the coat of arms is uncertain, but it is certified in 1640. Fleur-de-lys symbolizing belonging to the Kingdom of France, lions reminiscent of Picardy's ties with northern provinces: Flanders, Brabant, Hainaut and Luxembourg.

The flag thus created was never the flag of the Picardy Regional Council, which preferred a stylized design referring to three departments: Aisne, Oise and Somme. The flag of the Regional Council was displayed on its buildings. However, the flag referring to the Picardy coat of arms is used during cultural or recreational events by individuals and even some communities.

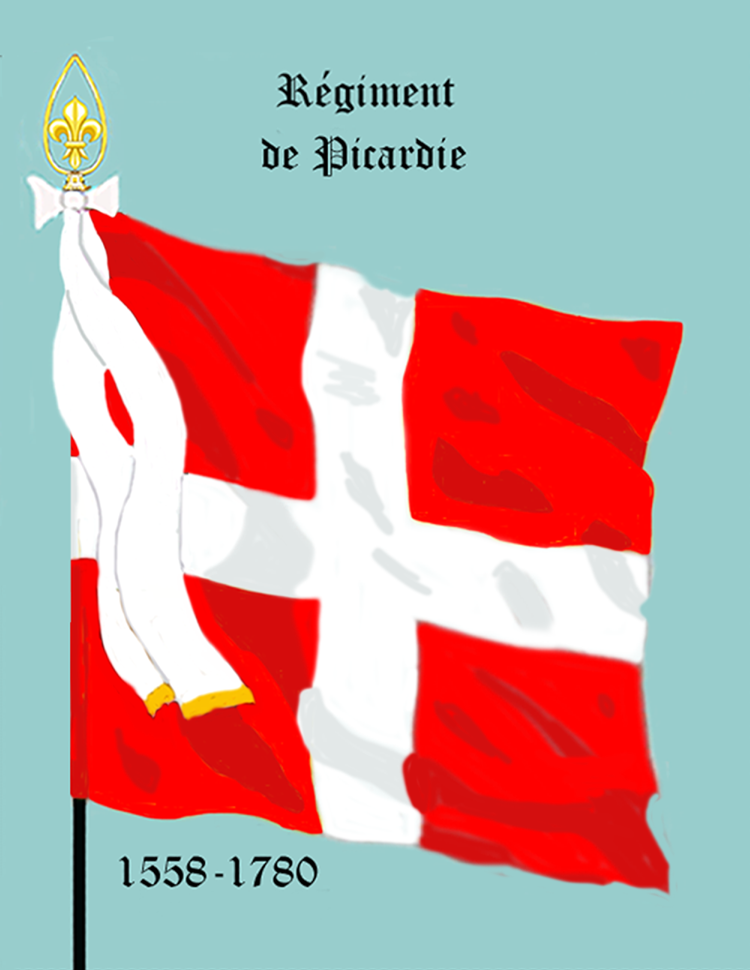
Banner of the Picardy Regiment in Kingdom of France (1585-1780).

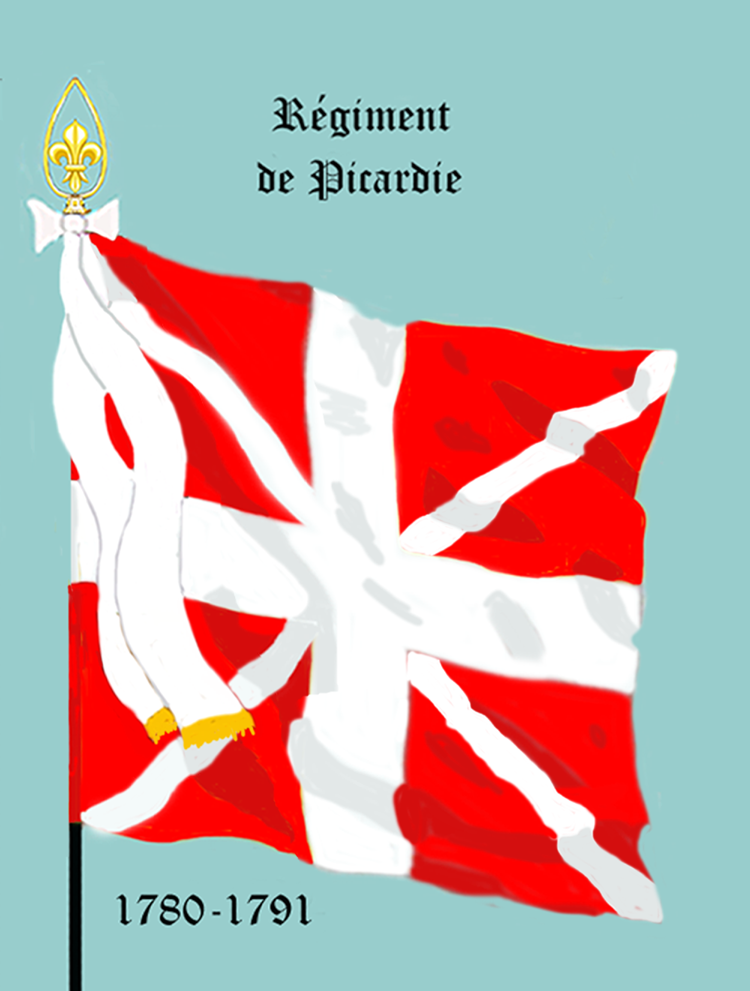
Banner of the Picardy Regiment in Kingdom of France (1780-1791).

Flag of the former Region of Picardie.
