= Jacques Lacombe (writer) =

French bookseller and writer (1724–1811)

Jacques Lacombe (1724–1811) was a French bookseller and lawyer.

His notable works include Encyclopediana ou Dictionnaire encyclopédique des ana (1791), one of the volumes of the Encyclopédie Méthodique. Another was Abrégé chronologique de l'histoire ancienne des empires et des républiques qui ont paru avant Jésus-Christ. Avec la notice des savans et illustres, & des remarques historiques sur le génie & les mœurs de ces anciens peuples. (1757). Most of his works were compilations.
