= Flag of Marseille =

Flag

Marseille
- Use: Civil flag
- Proportion: 2:3

The flag of Marseille consists of a rectangular white cloth with a light blue cross. It has a usual proportion of 2:3. It is a flag for civil use, since only the French national flag is hoisted in the town hall and in its premises. In the boats it is shown in secondary mast that is intended for the courtesy flag.

The medieval flag of the city already consisted of a white banner with a light blue cross. It had the peculiarity of being older than the coat of arms. The cross was adopted as a symbol of the Crusades, since at that time (11th - 13th centuries), in the ports of embarkation whose destination was the Holy Land, flags loaded with crosses were hoisted as a characteristic sign of the safe ports.

The first documented reference of the colors of Marseille is dated in 1254. It's about statutes of the city that prescribed its use: "de vexillo cum cruce communis Massilie portando in navibus et de alio vexillo". In 1257, in the agreement that the city signed with Charles of Anjou, Count of Provence, it was stated that "on land and sea, in their ships, galleys and other facilities, they will continue to show the flag of their municipality in the usual manner and only the banner of Mr. Count will be hoisted in the most honorable place".

In the 19th and 20th centuries, the flag was used by Marseille-based Fabre Line as its house flag.
