= Coat of arms of Belfast =

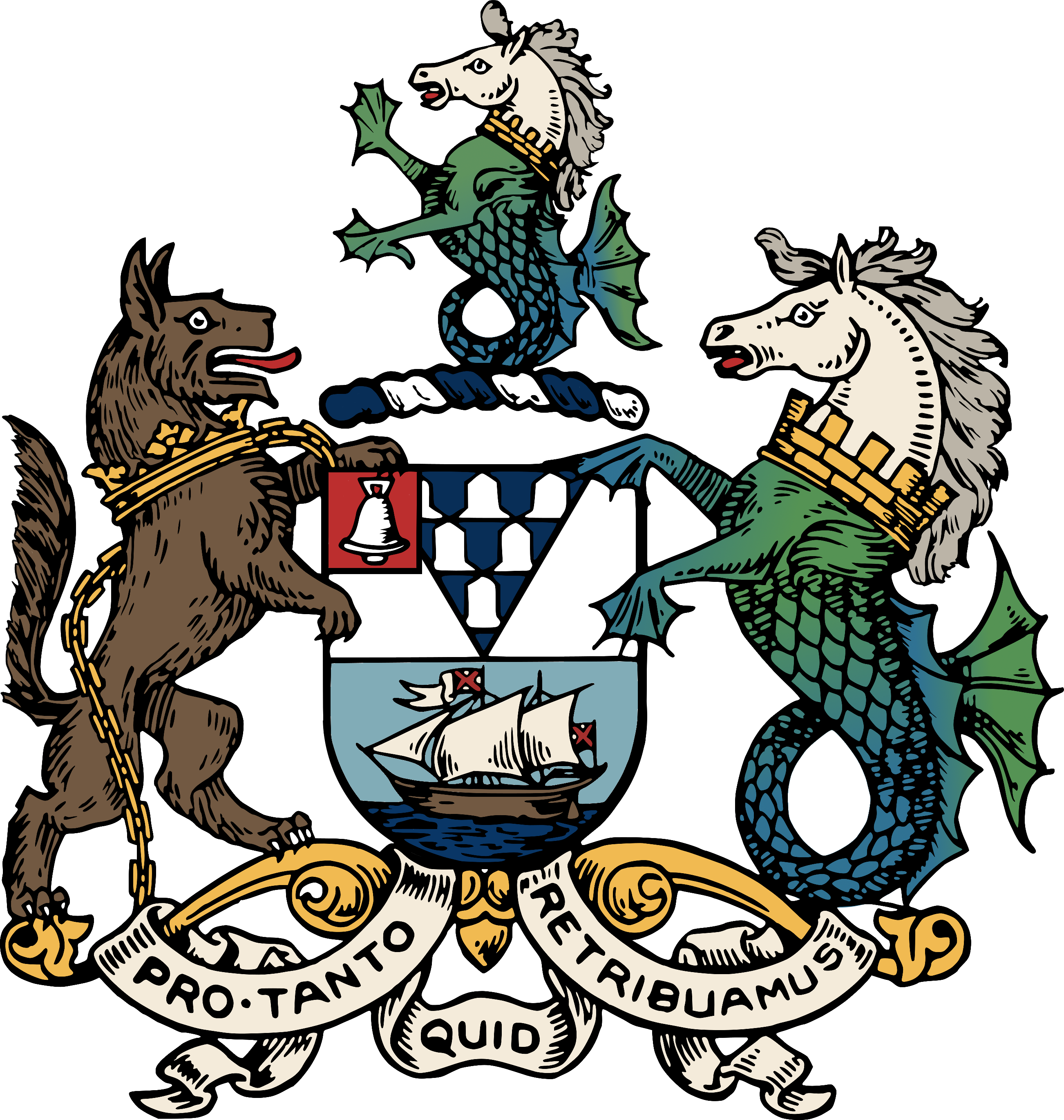
Coat of arms of Belfast (Note: The arms are blazoned: "Party per fesse argent and azure, in chief a pile vair, and on a canton gules a bell argent; in base, a ship with sails set argent, on waves of the sea proper. Supporters—(Dexter) a wolf proper, ducally gorged and chained or; (sinister) a sea-horse gorged with a mural crown proper. Crest—A sea-horse gorged with a mural crown proper. Motto—'Pro tanto quid retribuamus.'")

The coat of arms of Belfast was officially granted on 30 June 1890, although it has been used since the 17th century, making its first appearance on a seal adopted in 1640.

The arms depict a sailing ship beneath a pile or triangle of vair. The ship reflects the city's maritime history, while the vair comes from the arms of Sir Arthur Chichester, the founder of modern Belfast. There is also a canton emblazoned with a bell, representing the first syllable of the name (an example of "canting" or punning heraldry).

The symbolism of the shield is carried over into the supporters, a wolf and a seahorse. The wolf is a further reference to the Chichester family, whose arms were supported by two wolves, while the seahorse (which is repeated in the crest) is another maritime symbol, representing the steed on which Neptune was said to ride. The mural crowns were added after Belfast became a city in 1888.

The Latin motto, Pro tanto quid retribuamus, means "What return shall we make for so much?" or "In return for so much, what shall we give back?" This is a paraphrased version of Psalm 116:12, given in the Vulgate as Quid retribuam Domino pro omnibus quae retribuit mihi? ("What shall I render unto the Lord for all his benefits toward me?").

== Gallery ==
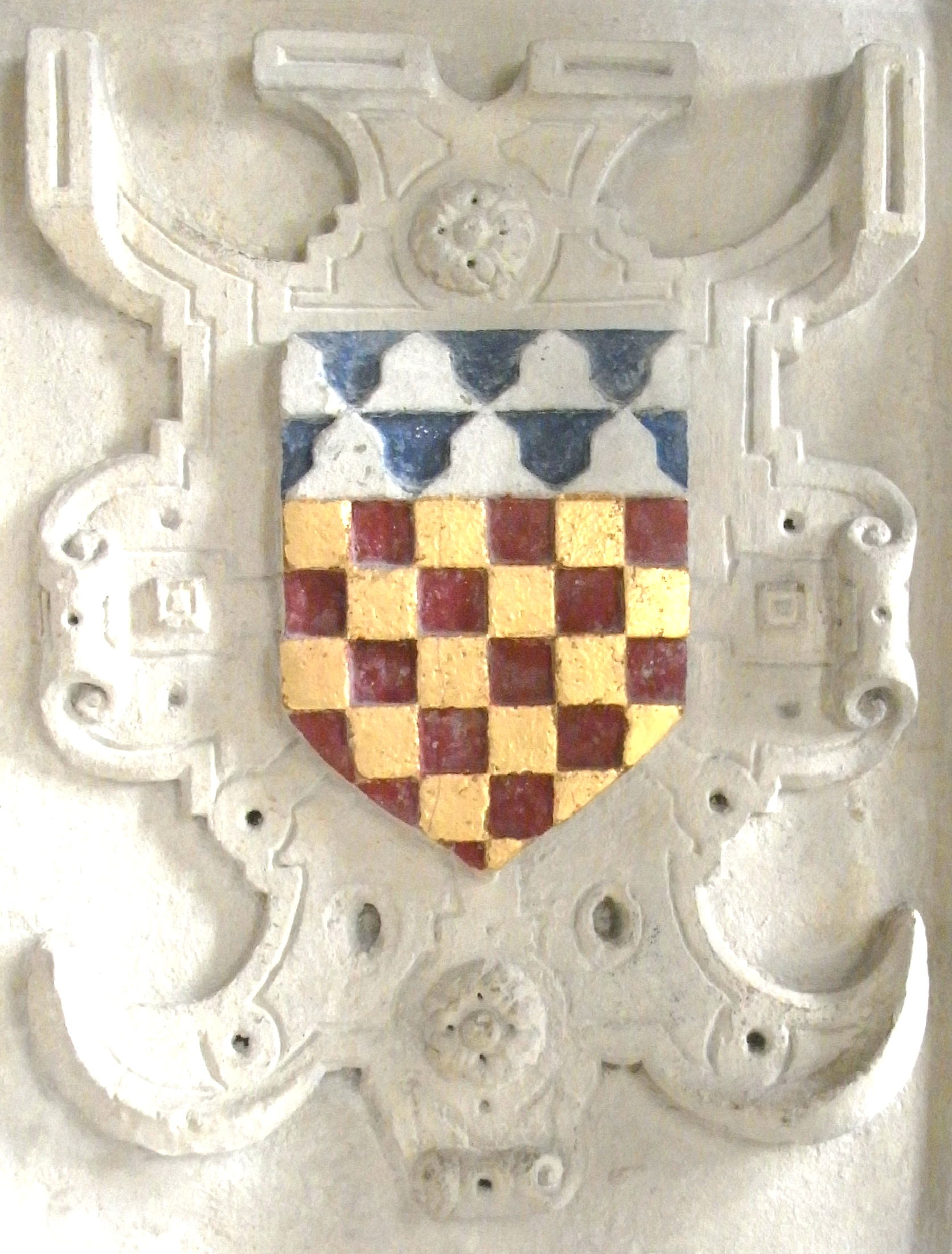
Arms of the Chichester family, including a vair chief

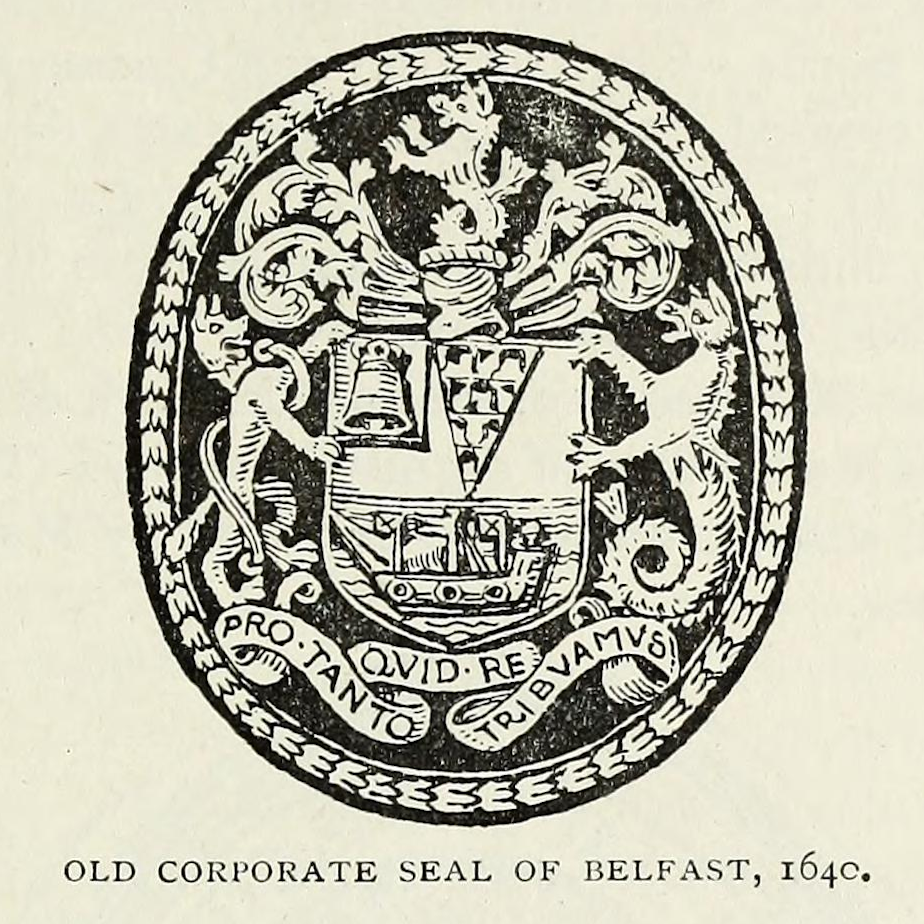
The seal of 1640

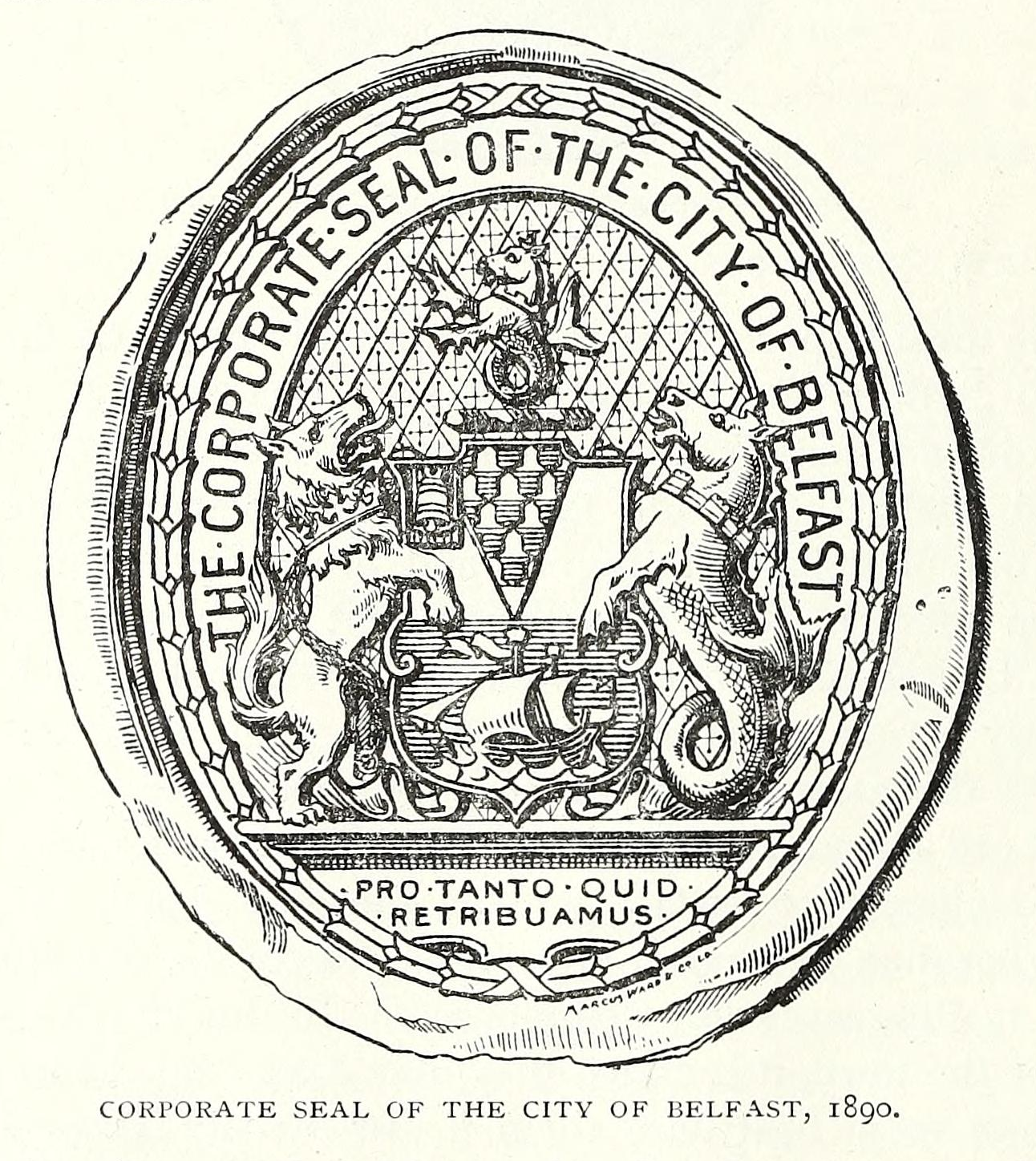
Redesigned seal adopted in 1890

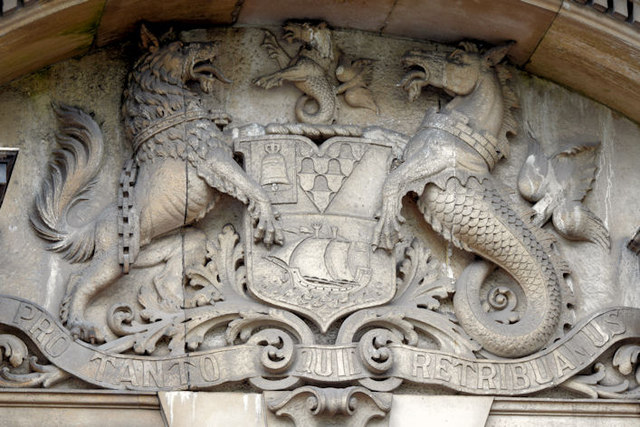
The arms above the entrance of John Bell House

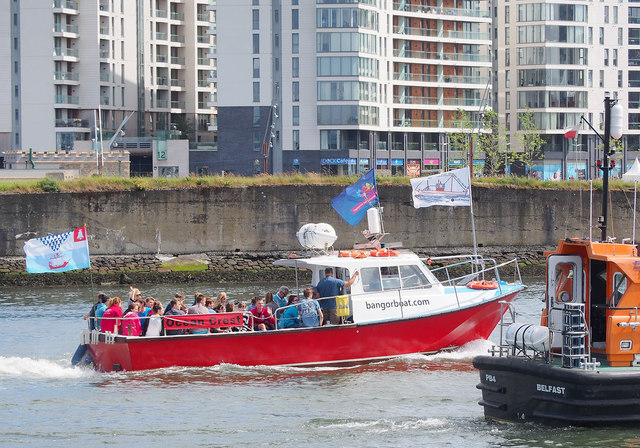
Boat in Belfast Harbour flying a banner of the arms

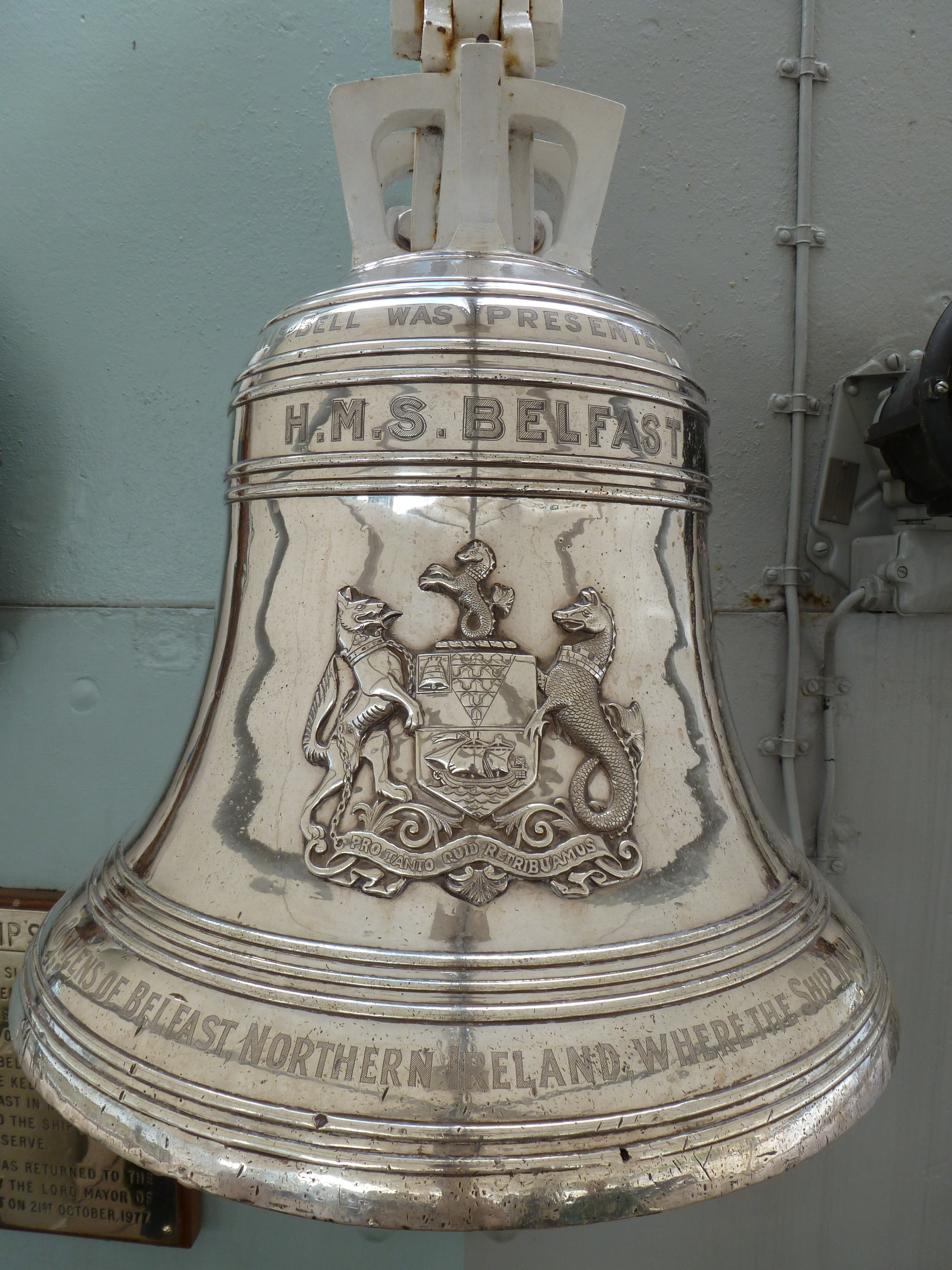
The arms on the bell of HMS Belfast
