= Ficelle picarde =

French stuffed pancake

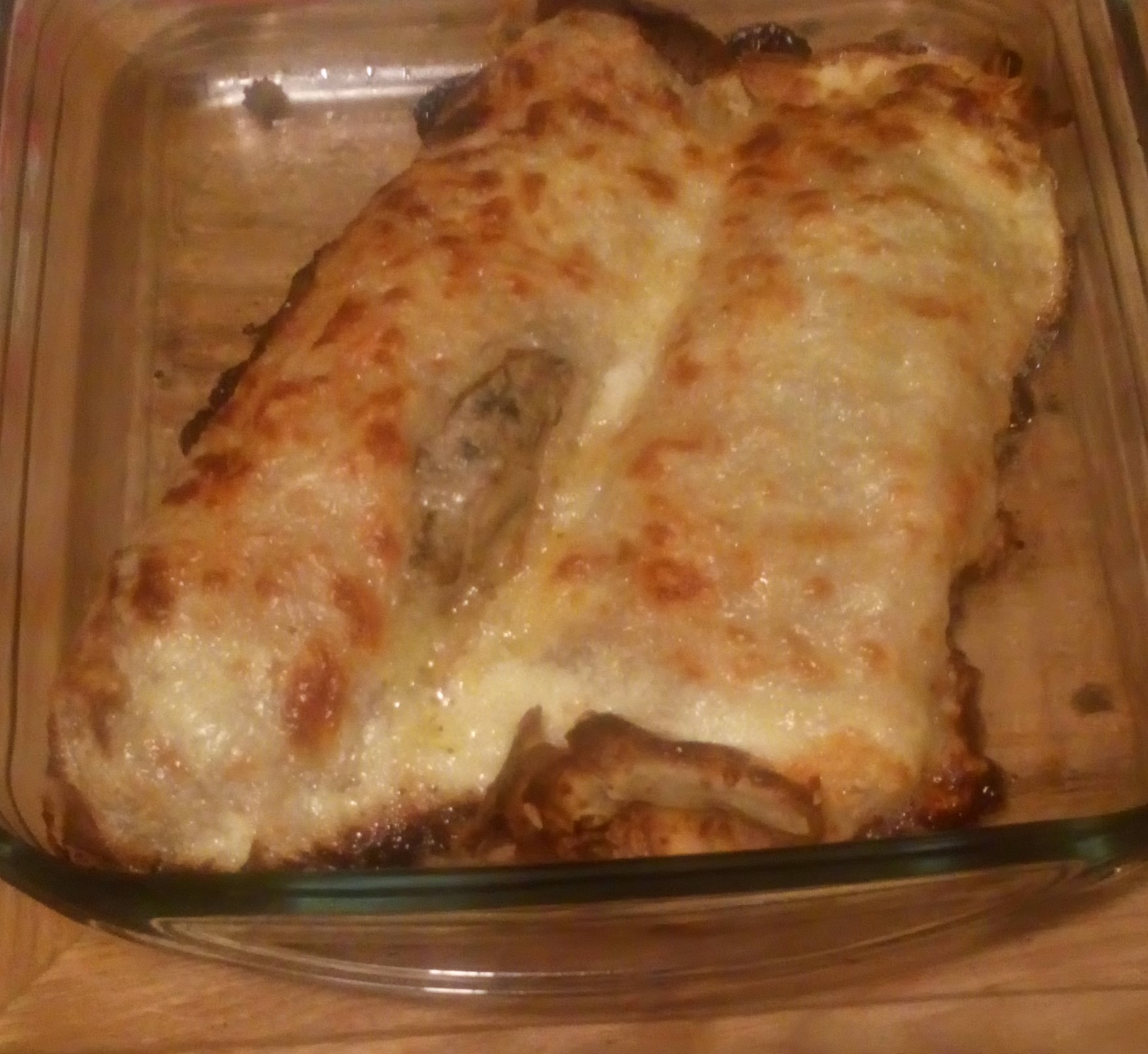
Ficelle picarde

Ficelle picarde (French pronunciation: [fisɛl pikaʁd], "Picardy string") is a dish of Picardy, northern France, consisting of a rolled savoury crêpe stuffed with a slice of ham and a creamed shallot duxelles, broiled in cream under a layer of cheese.

Though now considered a classic Picardy dish, it originated in Amiens' l'Hôtel du Commerce where a chef developed it in 1950, notwithstanding some legends that the dish originated in the era of Louis XIV.

== See also ==
- French cuisine
- List of French dishes
- List of pancakes
