= Coat of arms of Marseille =

Versions
- Escutcheon-only
- Armiger: City of Marseille
- Adopted: 14th century (documented); 1883 (current version)
- Crest: In silver, a mural crown of eight towers, five in sight
- Shield: In silver field, a cross of azure
- Supporters: In silver, in the right hand, a rampant and guard bull and, in the sinister one, a rampant lion
- Motto: Actibus immensis urbs fulget Massiliensis (The city of Marseille shines for its great achievements)
- Other elements: A trident and a silver caduceus placed in saltire

The coat of arms of Marseille has witnessed its existence since the 14th century. The current version was adopted in 1883.

The blazon proper of Marseille consists of a silver field (white) with a cross of azure (blue). It has its origin in the colors of the city's flag. Behind the shield itself are placed a trident and a silver caduceus placed in saltire (on blade). The trident is associated with the seas and fishing. The caduceus is usually presented as a symbol of commerce.

The heraldic supports -- the figures that flank the shield -- are the figure of a bull and a lion, both of silver. The bull, located in the right hand of the shield (left of the spectator), is rampant and guard (erect and watching the spectator). The lion is rampant.

In the crest, a French mural crown of silver is shown. The mural crown, of Roman origin, is often used by municipal corporations as an emblem of their power and authority. On the bottom, written in letters of saber (black color), is the motto of the city "Actibus immensis urbs fulget Massiliensis", which in Latin means "The city of Marseille shines through his great achievements".

== History ==
The flag of the city of Marseille, a white flag with a blue cross, has the peculiarity of being older than the coat of arms. The cross was adopted as a symbol of the Crusades, since at that time, (11th - 13th centuries) in the ports of embarkation to go to the Holy Land, flags loaded with crosses were hoisted as a characteristic sign of the safe ports.

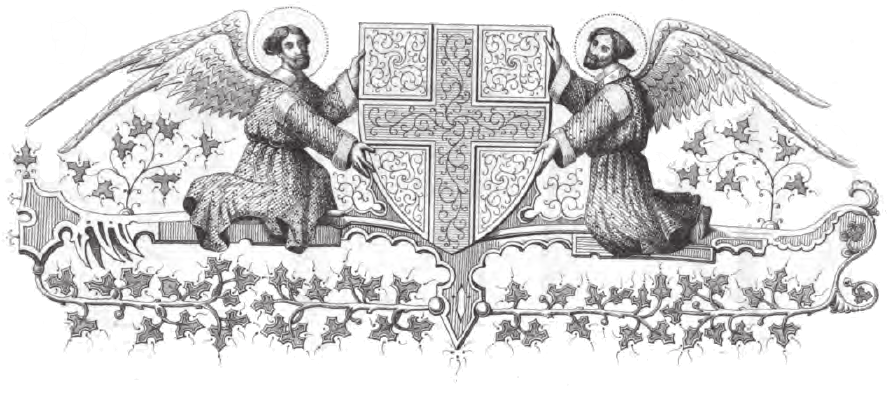
The coat of arms as they first appear in the Red Book

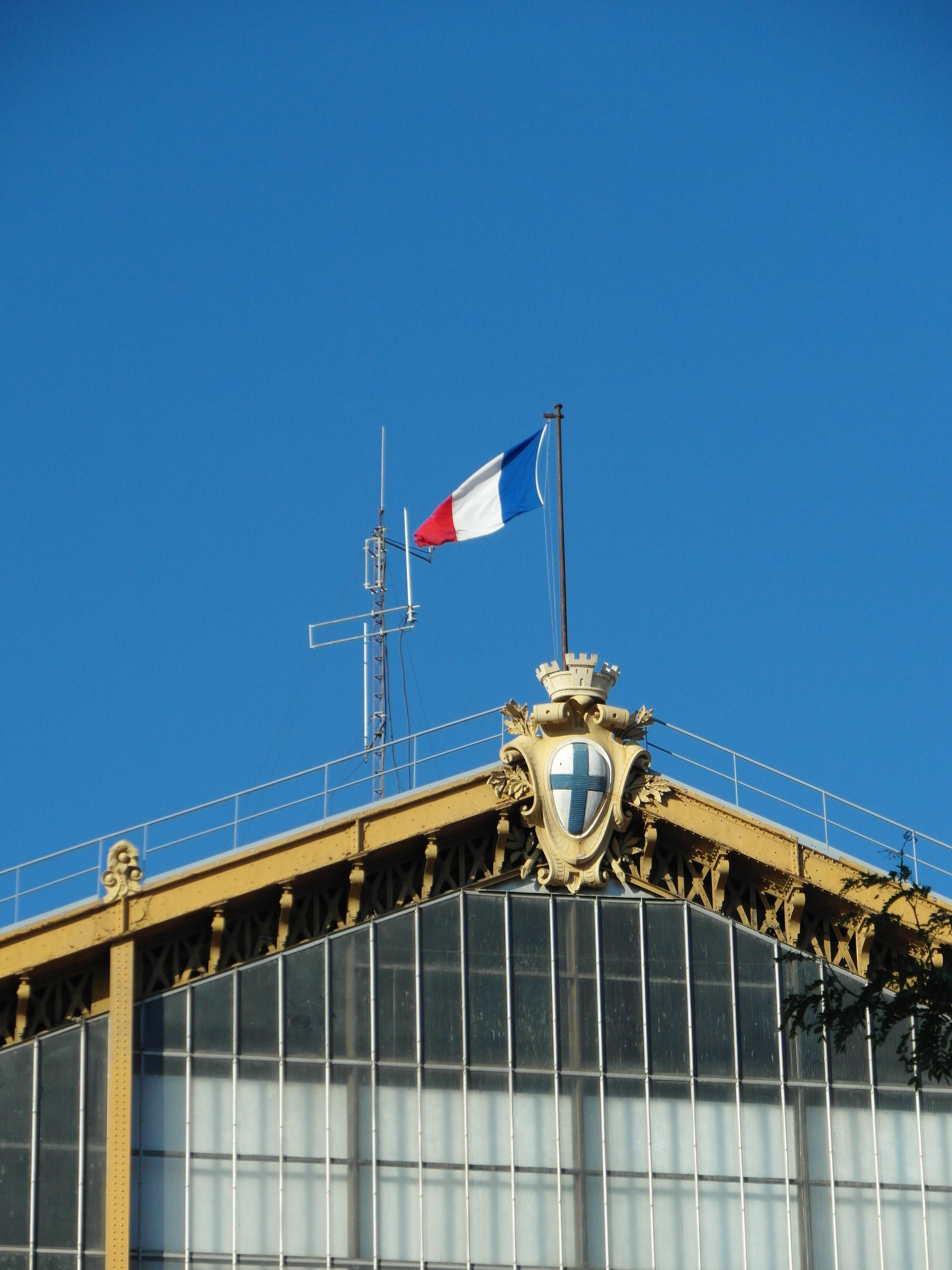
Displayed at Marseille-Saint-Charles

The first documented reference to the emblem of Marseille is dated in 1254, it's about statutes of the city that prescribed its use: «of vexillo cum cross communis Massilie carrying in navibus et de alio vexillo». In 1257, in the agreement that the city signed with Charles I of Anjou, Count of Provence, it was stated that "on land and sea, in their ships, galleys and other facilities, they will continue to show the flag of their municipality in the usual manner and only the banner of Mr. Count will be hoisted in the most honorable place". In that same year, the motto of the city appeared in Medieval Provençal: "De grands fachs resplend la cioutat de Marseilles" written in spelling of the era. The oldest graphic representation of the coat of arms dates back to the 14th century, it belongs to the Red Book of the city in an illumination in which an oath made in a viguerie, an administrative court of medieval France, is represented. In this scene can be seen four crosses of azure on a silver background.

With the passage of time, representations of the arms of the city (drawn, painted, printed or sculpted) carved on the facades of public buildings or decorating objects multiplied. Until 1699, the coat of arms was not officially registered in a General Armorial as a result of an edict established by Colbert that regulated the coats of arms.

On May 17, 1809, during the First Empire, it was allowed by decree that the municipalities recover their old blazons, suppressed in 1790 by the National Constituent Assembly. Marseille could enjoy this right in 1810. 6 New weapons were designed according to the guidelines of the Napoleonic heraldry: «in a cut field; in the first, silver, a cross of azure; in the second, of the same, a trireme of gold on a sea of sinople; the chief of gules loaded with three golden bees». However, Napoleonic weapons would never be used. During the Bourbon Restoration, Louis XVIII confirmed by royal patent, that the coat of arms of the city be adorned with a bull armed with a trident and a lion holding a caduceus, similar to those shown in the Armorial of 1699.

In 1826, a new version was approved in which a mural crown was introduced and the supports were replaced by a cornucopia and a trident accompanied by the inscription "Massilia civitas" (in Latin, City of Marseille). This composition is still used in an official seal of the municipality.

The large shield, intended for official documents, dates from 1883 and was designed by Joseph Laugier, a curator of the Cabinet of Coins and Medals. In it, the mural crown was kept and the bull, the lion and the motto of the city were recovered.
