= Coat of arms of Belgrade =

Versions
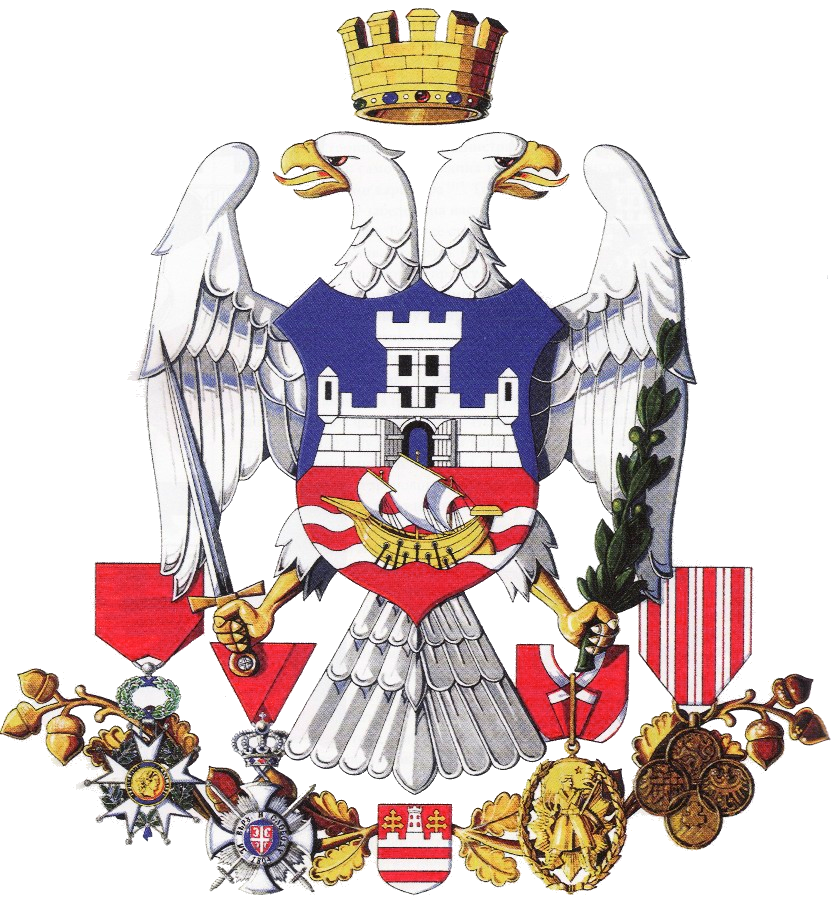
- Greater coat of arms

- Middle coat of arms

- Lesser coat of arms
- Armiger: City of Belgrade
- Adopted: 1931
- Order(s): Légion d'honneur (1920); Karađorđe's Star (1939); People's Hero (1974); Czechoslovak War Cross (1925)

The coat of arms of Belgrade is the official symbol of the City of Belgrade and is stable in three levels - as Basic or Small, Medium and Large.

The history of heraldic representation of Belgrade is long and goes back to the time when the city first became the Serbian capital during Despot Stefan Lazarevic when this symbol was first indirectly mentioned in Life of Despot Stefan Lazarević. The first known heraldic shaped coat of arms of the city appears in the sixteenth century and is probably of Hungarian origin. But like the history of the city itself, so did its coat of arms. As the city passed from hand to hand of the various invaders, so did its heraldic representation change - whether the city did not have its coat of arms as under the Ottomans at all, or that it got a whole new one under the Austrians.

The history of the coat of arms of Belgrade, which is in use today, began in 1931 when it was officially elected, following a competition that won the work of Đorđe Andrejević-Kun. In the socialist era, the coat of arms was neglected, and after the democratic changes of the 1990s it would undergo a re-affirmation, and since the 2000s it would be reorganized to three degrees, which is still in use today.

The use of the coat of arms of Belgrade is governed by the City Statute and special city regulations, which regulate and sanction the use of the coat of arms in various occasions and places in detail.

== History ==
The original coat of arms was commissioned in 1931 by Belgrade mayor Milan Nešić. The winning proposal was sketched by Đorđe Andrejević-Kun. The arms remained in continued use until the conclusion of the Second World War. Between 1946 and 1991, it included a red star on top to symbolize communist rule. The use of the arms was amended and regulated in 2003.

=== Symbolism ===
The arms contain the Serbian national colours (red, blue, and white). The red ground symbolises blood split over the city during its many conflicts. The blue sky symbolizes hope and faith in a better future. The white walls and tower symbolise the "white city" (Belgrade – Beograd literally means "the white city). The white rivers below represent the Danube and Sava and the primordial beginning of Belgrade while the Roman trireme refers to its antiquity. The open gates of the city represent free communication and commerce with the world.

== Modern use ==
=== Small coat of arms ===
The small (or lesser) coat of arms is the original design by Đorđe Andrejević-Kun. It features a simple escutcheon.

Blazon of Basic Coat of Arms:

“The basic coat of arms of the city is a baroque shield, on a blue field is a silver, stone-walled city with sloping walls with a four-toothed crown and two angular cantilever towers with conical roofs with one narrow black-filled window overlaid with an outer pair of crown teeth. Above the city crown, between the observation towers and above, into the field, open two-leafed silver gates of talpa with two horizontal beams of fastening through which an arched opening with wedge-shaped stone shows the blueness of the sky, rises a two-story silver, stone-built, tower with a triangular crown and with two black rectangular windows on each floor. The city rests on escaped red soil above two wavy silver beams, representing the Sava and Danube rivers. On the lower right is a golden antique trireme with crucified silver square sails and black ropes and with silver circular openings on the hull in three rows from which come black oars immersed in the river, in the upper row three, in the middle four. and in the bottom row two oars."

=== Middle coat of arms ===
The middle (or medium) coat of arms is identical to the small, but with the addition of a golden mural crown placed above the escutcheon. The crown features five merlons, and a diadem with five gems (rubies, sapphires, emeralds). According to the standards of Serbian Heraldry Society, this wall crown with five indents belongs only to the capital city, and the diadem with jewels belongs to the historical capitals.

=== Greater coat of arms ===
The greater coat of arms consists of a silver (white) bicephalic eagle, with gold talons and beak. The eagle is a symbol of the Serbian state, and is consistent with the national coat of arms of Serbia. On the eagle's chest are the coat of arms of Belgrade, which emphasis the status of capital, and above the eagle's heads is the wall crown of the medium coat of arms. Underneath the eagle are two oak branches, which represent civic virtues, and over the point where they cross is the first known coat of arms of Belgrade, which represents the heraldic history of the city. The sword and the olive branch on the large coat of arms represent readiness to fight in war, and to cooperate in peace. Over the oak branches are decorations given to Belgrade, in their natural colours, and with appropriate ribbons. They stand for the glorious past and merits of the citizens of Belgrade. The medals are:

1. Légion d'honneur, founded on May 19, 1802, by Napoleon Bonaparte, and is given as fifth grade and is the highest decoration of France. It was awarded to Belgrade in 1920, by Franchet d'Espèrey, French marshal, and honorary Field marshal of Serbian army. Only four cities outside France have received this medal: Belgrade, Liège, Luxembourg, and Stalingrad. Awarded to Belgrade in recognition of the glorious defence of city during World War I.
2. Order of the Karađorđe's Star, awarded to Belgrade on May 18, 1939. The order was founded in four grades King Petar I of Serbia on January 1, 1904.
3. Order of the People's Hero, awarded to Belgrade on October 20, 1974 (on the occasion of the thirtieth anniversary of the liberation of Belgrade during World War II)
4. Czechoslovak War Cross, awarded to Belgrade on October 8, 1925, founded by the Czechoslovak government. It was given for courage, and valour in fighting the enemy during World War I.

== See also ==
- Flag of Belgrade
