= Cap de la Hague =

Cape in Normandy, France

Coordinates: 49°40′N 1°50′W

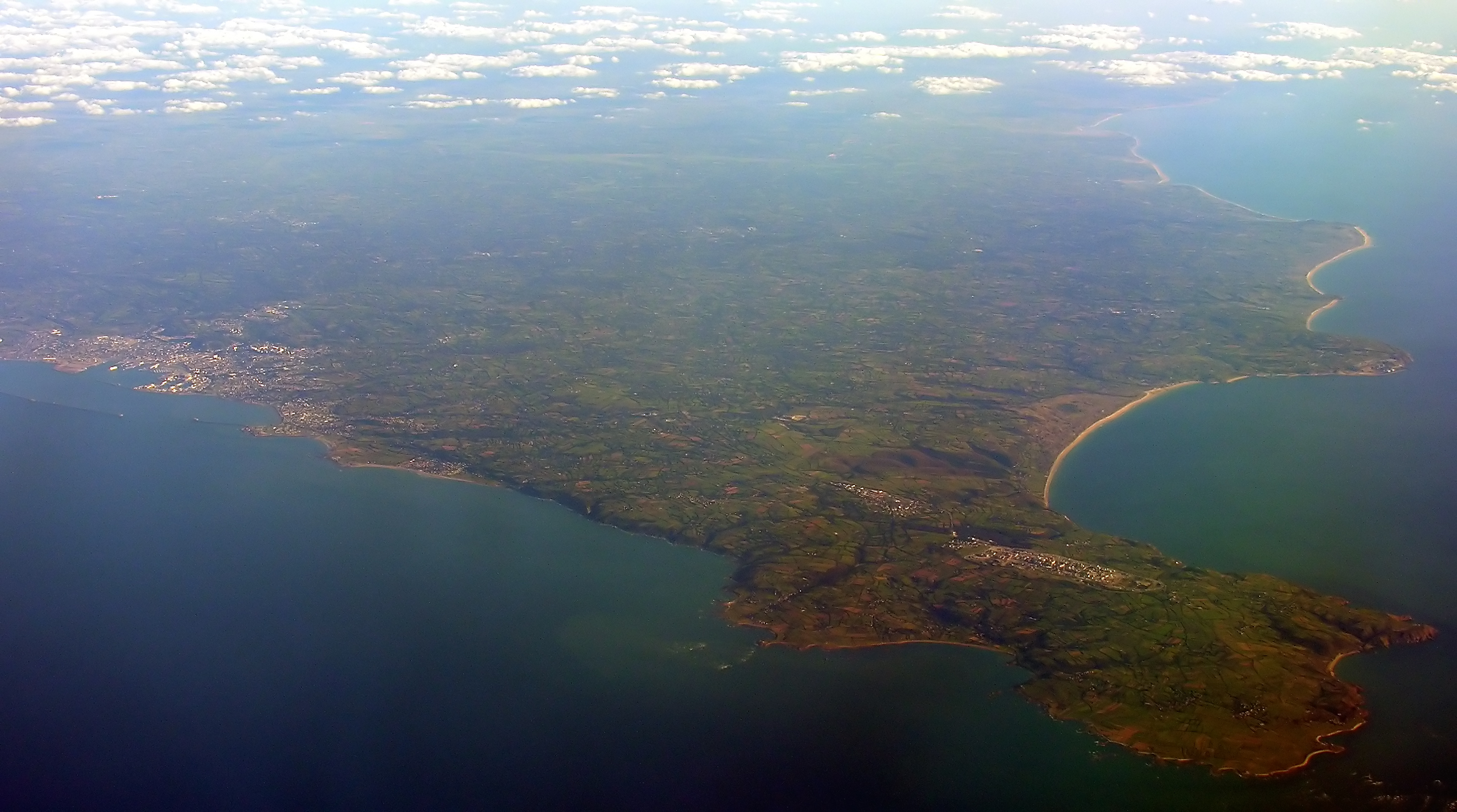
Cape of la Hague with Cherbourg on the left

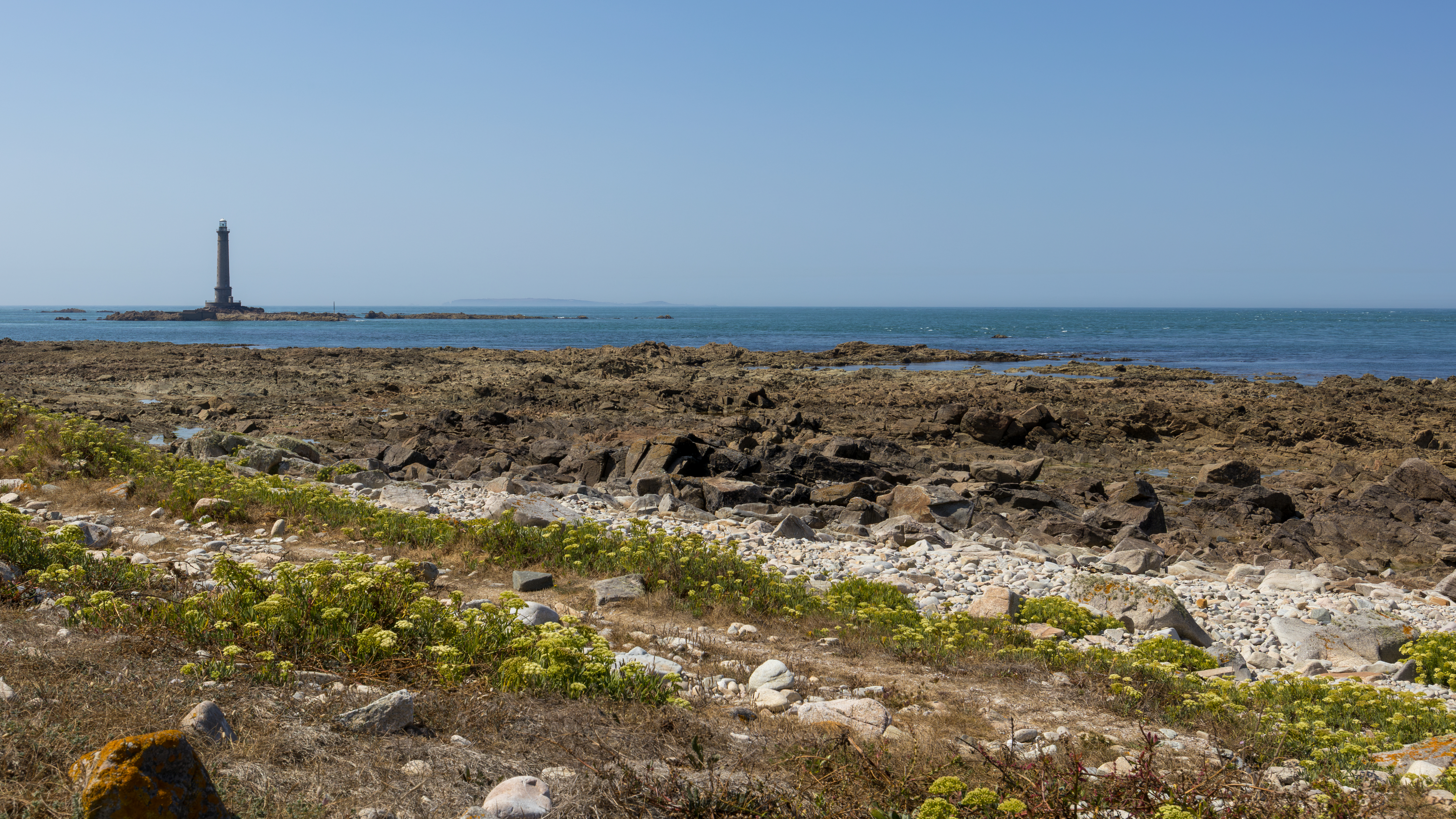

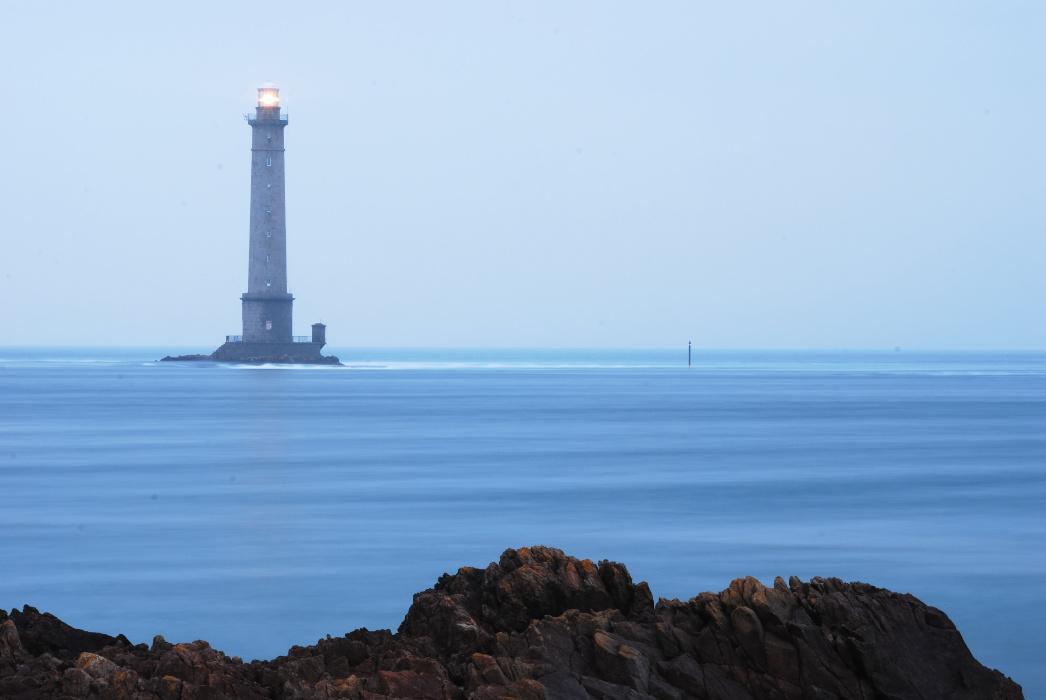
The La Hague lighthouse

Cap de la Hague (French pronunciation: [kap də la aɡ]) is a cape at the tip of the Cotentin Peninsula in Normandy, France.

The La Hague area has precambrian granite and gneiss cliffs, several coves and small fields surrounded by hedges. France's oldest rocks are to be found on its coast in Jobourg. Other rocky outcroppings on the coast include Cadomian granite in Auderville and Variscan granite in Flamanville.

The La Hague cape consists of two promontories about half a mile apart. The cape itself, which has the lighthouse and a lifeboat station, is very low-lying.

The dialect of the Norman language spoken by a minority in the region is called Haguais. The Norman poet Côtis-Capel was a native of the region and used the landscape as inspiration for his poetry. The painter Jean-François Millet was also a native of the region.

The La Hague site, the largest light water reactor nuclear waste reprocessing plant on earth (over half of the world's capacity), is located in the region.

== Climate ==
Climate data for Cap de la Hague (1991–2020 normals), extremes since 1936
Month	Jan	Feb	Mar	Apr	May	Jun	Jul	Aug	Sep	Oct	Nov	Dec	Year
Record high °C (°F)	14.8 (58.6)	17.0 (62.6)	20.8 (69.4)	22.0 (71.6)	26.6 (79.9)	29.2 (84.6)	32.9 (91.2)	31.4 (88.5)	29.8 (85.6)	28.0 (82.4)	19.6 (67.3)	16.2 (61.2)	32.9 (91.2)
Mean daily maximum °C (°F)	9.4 (48.9)	9.2 (48.6)	10.5 (50.9)	12.4 (54.3)	14.8 (58.6)	17.3 (63.1)	19.3 (66.7)	19.8 (67.6)	18.6 (65.5)	16.0 (60.8)	12.8 (55.0)	10.5 (50.9)	14.2 (57.6)
Daily mean °C (°F)	7.8 (46.0)	7.5 (45.5)	8.6 (47.5)	10.1 (50.2)	12.4 (54.3)	14.9 (58.8)	16.8 (62.2)	17.5 (63.5)	16.5 (61.7)	14.1 (57.4)	11.0 (51.8)	8.8 (47.8)	12.2 (53.9)
Mean daily minimum °C (°F)	6.2 (43.2)	5.7 (42.3)	6.6 (43.9)	7.8 (46.0)	10.1 (50.2)	12.4 (54.3)	14.4 (57.9)	15.2 (59.4)	14.3 (57.7)	12.1 (53.8)	9.3 (48.7)	7.1 (44.8)	10.1 (50.2)
Record low °C (°F)	−8.6 (16.5)	−6.2 (20.8)	−2.6 (27.3)	0.1 (32.2)	1.2 (34.2)	7.0 (44.6)	7.8 (46.0)	10.0 (50.0)	8.0 (46.4)	0.4 (32.7)	−2.2 (28.0)	−4.0 (24.8)	−8.6 (16.5)
Average precipitation mm (inches)	67.9 (2.67)	61.8 (2.43)	50.9 (2.00)	36.2 (1.43)	40.5 (1.59)	33.8 (1.33)	37.9 (1.49)	43.9 (1.73)	41.0 (1.61)	84.6 (3.33)	83.0 (3.27)	81.5 (3.21)	663 (26.09)
Source: Infoclimat (1991–2020 normals)
