= Petit suisse (disambiguation) =

Petit suisse, Petit Suisse or Petit-Suisse is a French cheese.

It may also refer to:

- Little Switzerland (Luxembourg) in Luxembourg
- Villa Petite Suisse, Nazareth (Maastricht), South Limburg (Netherlands)
- Dompierre-les-Ormes, a commune in Bourgogne-Franche-Comté, France, known locally as la petite Suisse du Mâconnais
