= Lower Normandy =

Former administrative region in France

Coordinates: 49°00′N 1°00′W

Lower Normandy Basse-Normandie (French) Basse-Normaundie (Norman)
- Flag

- Country: France
- Dissolved: 2016-01-01
- Prefecture: Caen
- Departments: 3: Calvados (14); Manche (50); Orne (61)

Area
  - Total: 17,589 km^{2} (6,791 sq mi)

Population (2007-01-01)
  - Total: 1,453,000

GDP
  - Total: €51.149 billion (2024)
  - Per capita: €34,421 (2024)
- ISO 3166 code: FR-P
- NUTS Region: FR2

Lower Normandy (French: Basse-Normandie, IPA: [bɑs nɔʁmɑ̃di, bas -]; Norman: Basse-Normaundie) is a former administrative region of France. On 1 January 2016, Lower and Upper Normandy merged becoming one region called Normandy.

== Geography ==
The region included three departments, Calvados, Manche and Orne, that cover the part of Normandy traditionally termed "Lower Normandy" lying west of the river Dives, the Pays d'Auge (except a small part remaining in Upper Normandy), a small part of the Pays d'Ouche (the main part remaining in Upper Normandy), the Norman Perche, and part of the "French" Perche. It covers 10,857 km^{2}, 3.2 percent of the surface area of France.

The traditional districts of Lower Normandy include the Cotentin Peninsula and La Hague, the Campagne de Caen, the Norman Bocage, the Bessin, and the Avranchin.

== History ==
Regions relating to Lower Normandy: Gallia Lugdunensis, Neustria, and Normandy.

The traditional province of Normandy, with an integral history reaching back to the 10th century, was divided in 1956 into two regions: Lower Normandy and Upper Normandy.

During the Roman era, the region was divided into several different city-states. That of Vieux was excavated in the 17th century, revealing numerous structures and vestiges bearing testimony to the prosperity of the Caen region.

The region was conquered by the Franks in the 5th century.

In the 9th century, the Norman conquests devastated the region. Much of the territory of Lower Normandy was added to the Duchy of Normandy in the 10th century.

In 1066, Duke William Il of Normandy conquered England. He was buried in Caen. After his death, Normandy went to his eldest son and England went to his second son, separating the two possessions.

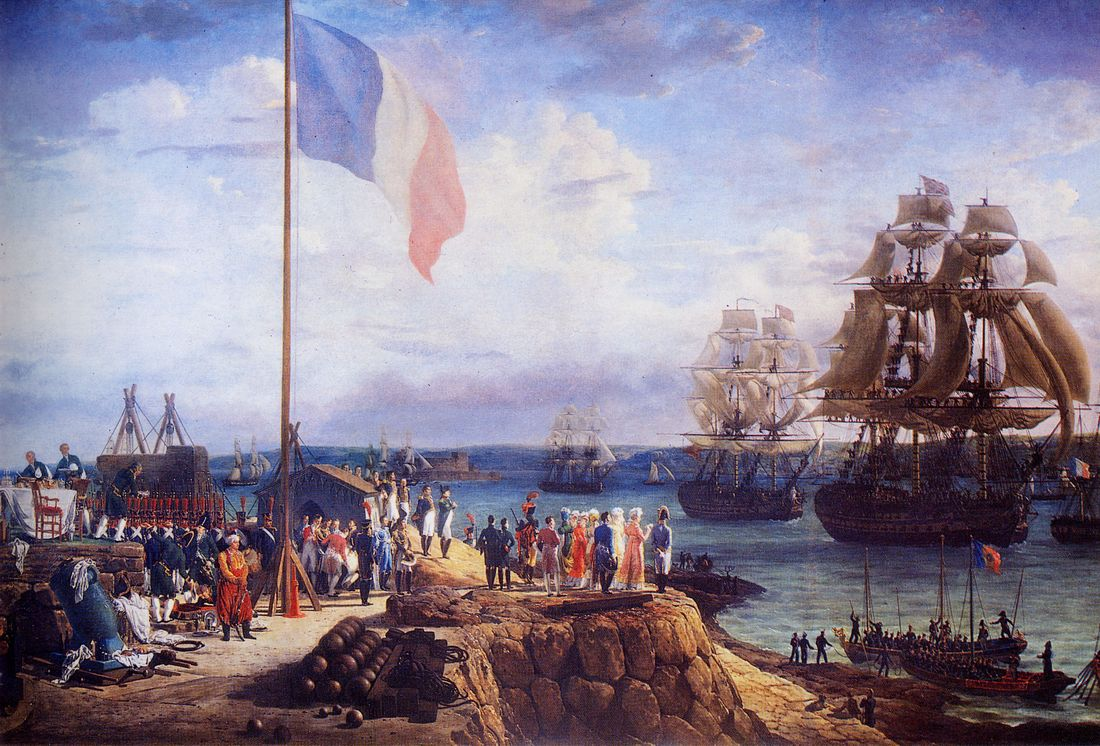
Napoleon I of France and Marie Louise attending a naval review in Cherbourg in 1811

The victory of Tinchebray in 1106 gave Normandy to the kings of England again. Nearly one hundred years later, in 1204, King Philip II Augustus of France conquered the region, apart from the Channel Islands. Then, during the Hundred Years' War, it was regained by the Plantagenets. However, the French recovered the mainland part of the region between 1436 and 1450.

During the Second World War, the main thrust of Operation Overlord was focused on Lower Normandy. The beaches of Calvados were the site of the D-Day landings in June 1944. Lower Normandy suffered badly during the War, with many of its towns and villages being destroyed or badly damaged during the Battle of Normandy.

== Economy ==
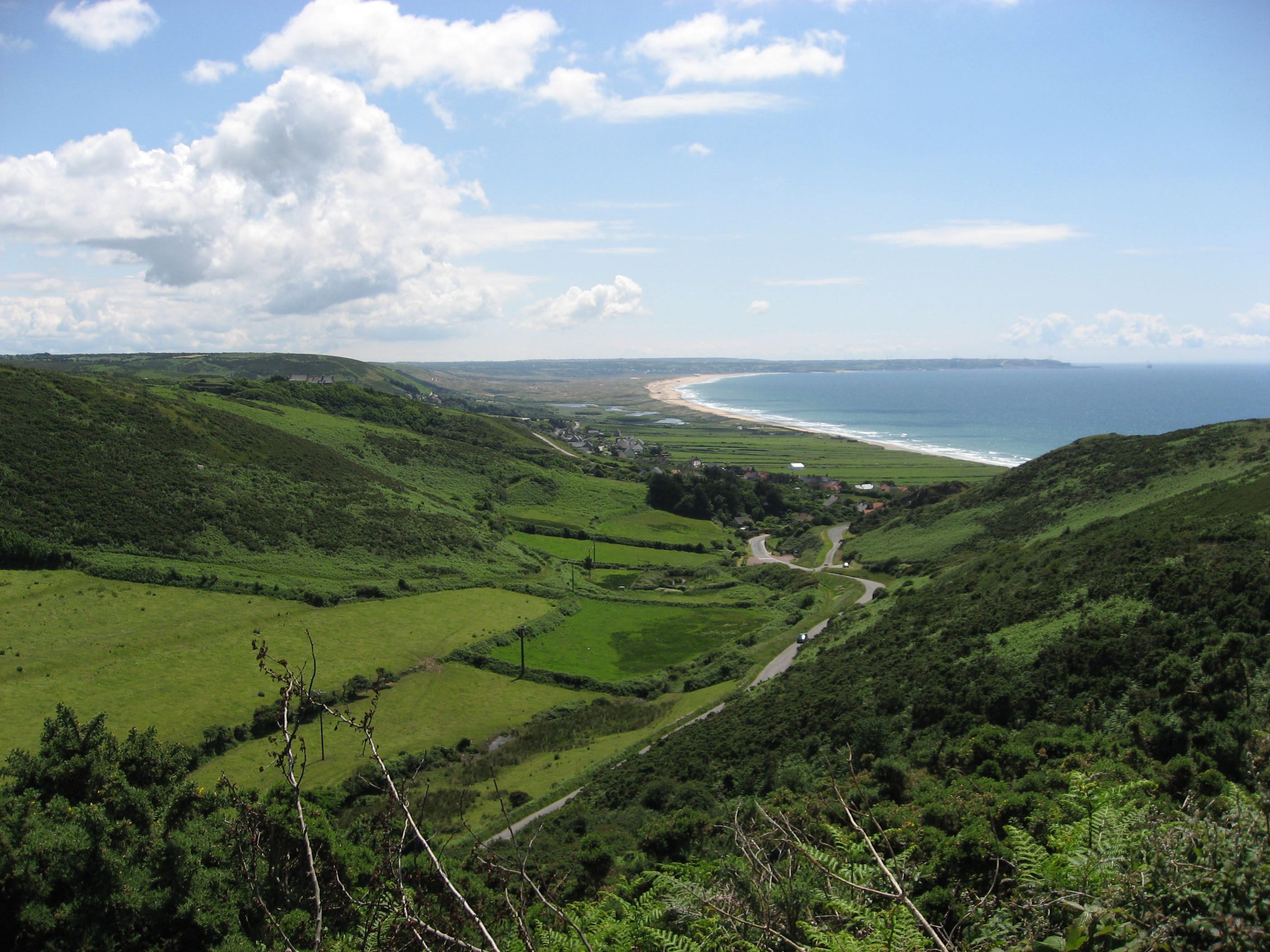
Scenery of Lower Normandy

The region's economy is heavily agricultural, with livestock and dairy farming, textiles and fruit production among its major industries. The region is the leader in France in the sectors of butter, fromage frais, soft cheeses, cider apples, cider, leeks, turnips, and flax. The region also breeds more horses than any other in France. The western part of the region is used mainly for farming, because of the prairies. Iron ore is mined near Caen. Tourism is also a major industry. The region has direct ferry links to England (via the port of Cherbourg and Caen Ouistreham).

== Culture ==
In addition to French, Normandy has its own regional language, Norman. It is still in use today in Lower Normandy, with the dialects of the Cotentin more in evidence than others. Lower Normandy has also been the home of many well-known French authors, including Guy de Maupassant, Marcel Proust, Jules Barbey d'Aurevilly. Notable Norman language authors connected especially with Lower Normandy include Alfred Rossel, Louis Beuve, and Côtis-Capel.

In terms of music, composer Erik Satie also hailed from this region. In the visual arts, Jean-François Millet was a native of La Hague. Eugène Boudin was born in Honfleur and Fernand Léger in Argentan. Important events include Deauville Asian Film Festival and Deauville American Film Festival.

== Major communities ==
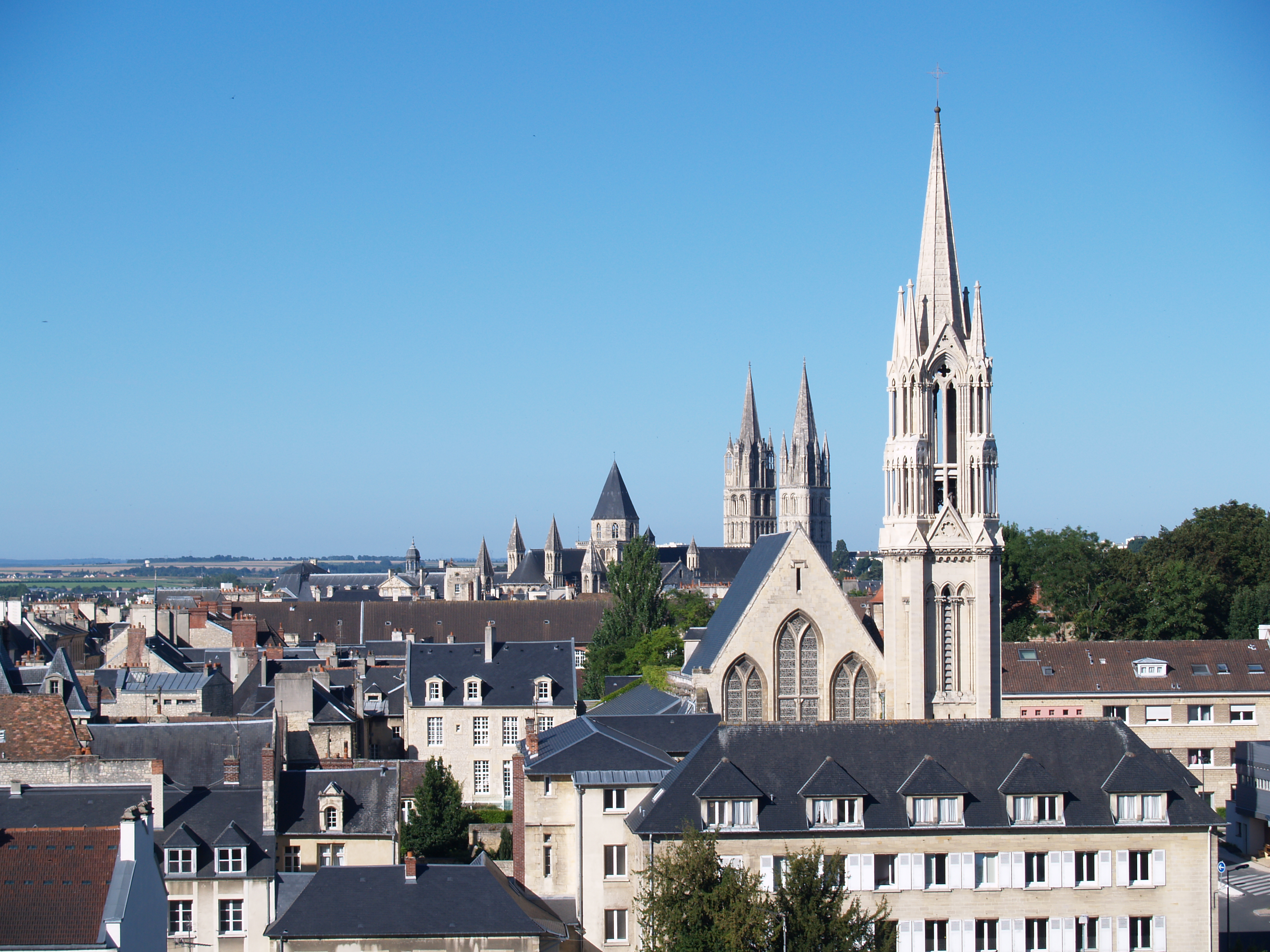
View of downtown Caen and the Abbey of St. Étienne

- Alençon
- Argentan
- Avranches
- Bayeux
- Caen
- Cherbourg-Octeville
- Deauville
- Flers
- Hérouville-Saint-Clair
- Lisieux
- Saint-Lô
- Tourlaville
