= Cotentinais =

Norman dialect of the Cotentin Peninsula

- cotentinais, le normand du Cotentin
- Native to: France
- Region: Cotentin Peninsula (Manche)
- Native speakers: no separate census; part of an estimated 19,000 to 50,000 Norman speakers
- Language family: Indo-European: Italic; Latino-Faliscan; Latinic; Romance; Italo-Western; Western; Gallo-Romance; Oïl; Norman; Northern (mainland) Norman; Cotentinais
- Early forms: Vulgar Latin: Proto-Romance; Old Gallo-Romance; Old French; Old Norman

Language codes
- ISO 639-3: –
- Glottolog: None
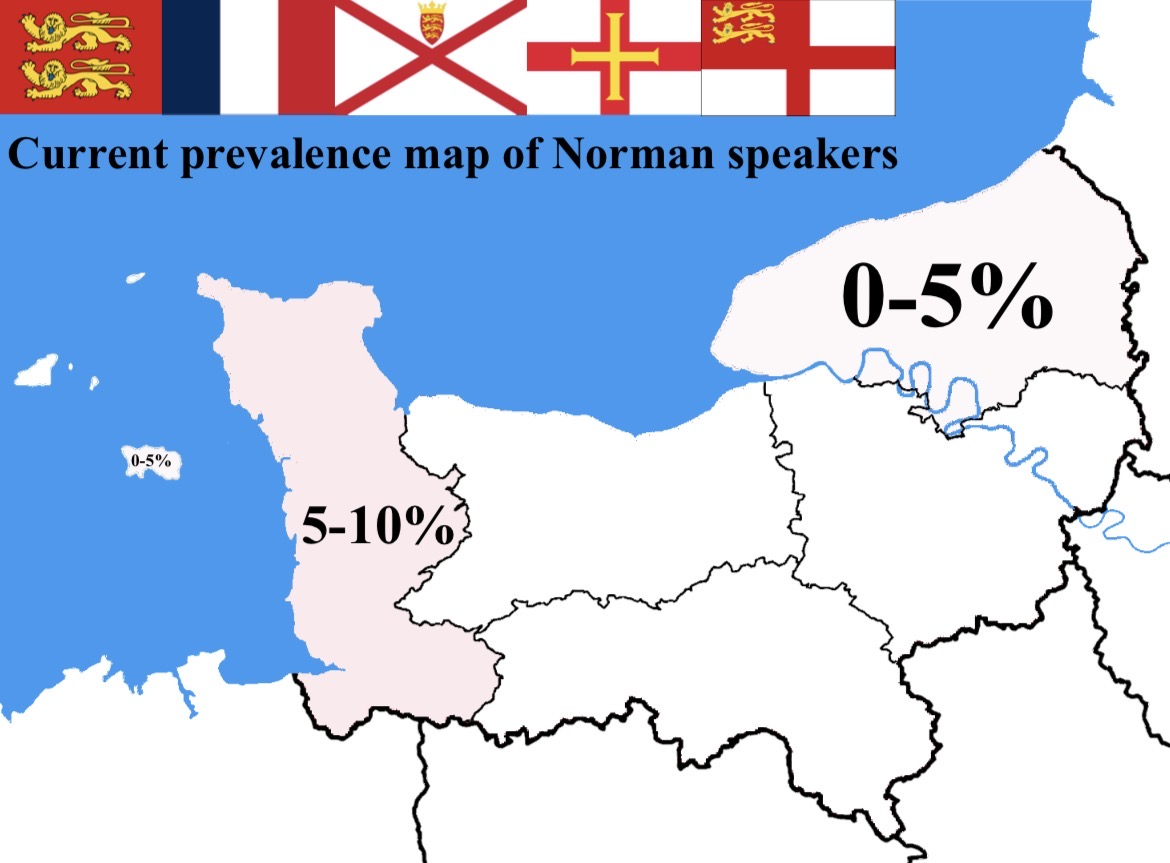
- Prevalence of Norman speakers; Cotentinais is the westernmost mainland variety.

Cotentinais (French pronunciation: [kɔtɑ̃tinɛ]; le normand du Cotentin) is the variety of the Norman language spoken on the Cotentin Peninsula, in the Manche department of Normandy, France. Together with Cauchois in the east, it is one of the best-preserved mainland forms of Norman. It belongs to the northern group of Norman, spoken north and west of the Joret line, and is closely related to the insular Norman of the Channel Islands (Jèrriais and Guernésiais).

Like Norman generally, Cotentinais descends from the Gallo-Romance speech of Neustria, overlaid from the 10th century with a Norse element left by Scandinavian settlers, which is especially visible in its maritime and rural vocabulary. After the incorporation of continental Normandy into the French crown in 1204 and the later standardisation of French, Norman declined to the status of a spoken patois; a literary revival began in the Cotentin in the later 19th century. The language is today classified as severely endangered, with transmission largely broken and its survival dependent on cultural associations.

== Name ==
The dialect is named after the Cotentin, the peninsula that forms the northern part of the Manche. The name of the region derives ultimately from the city of Coutances (Latin Constantia; the surrounding district was the pagus Constantinus), whose older French form Costentin was used by the 12th-century Norman poet Wace.

== Classification ==
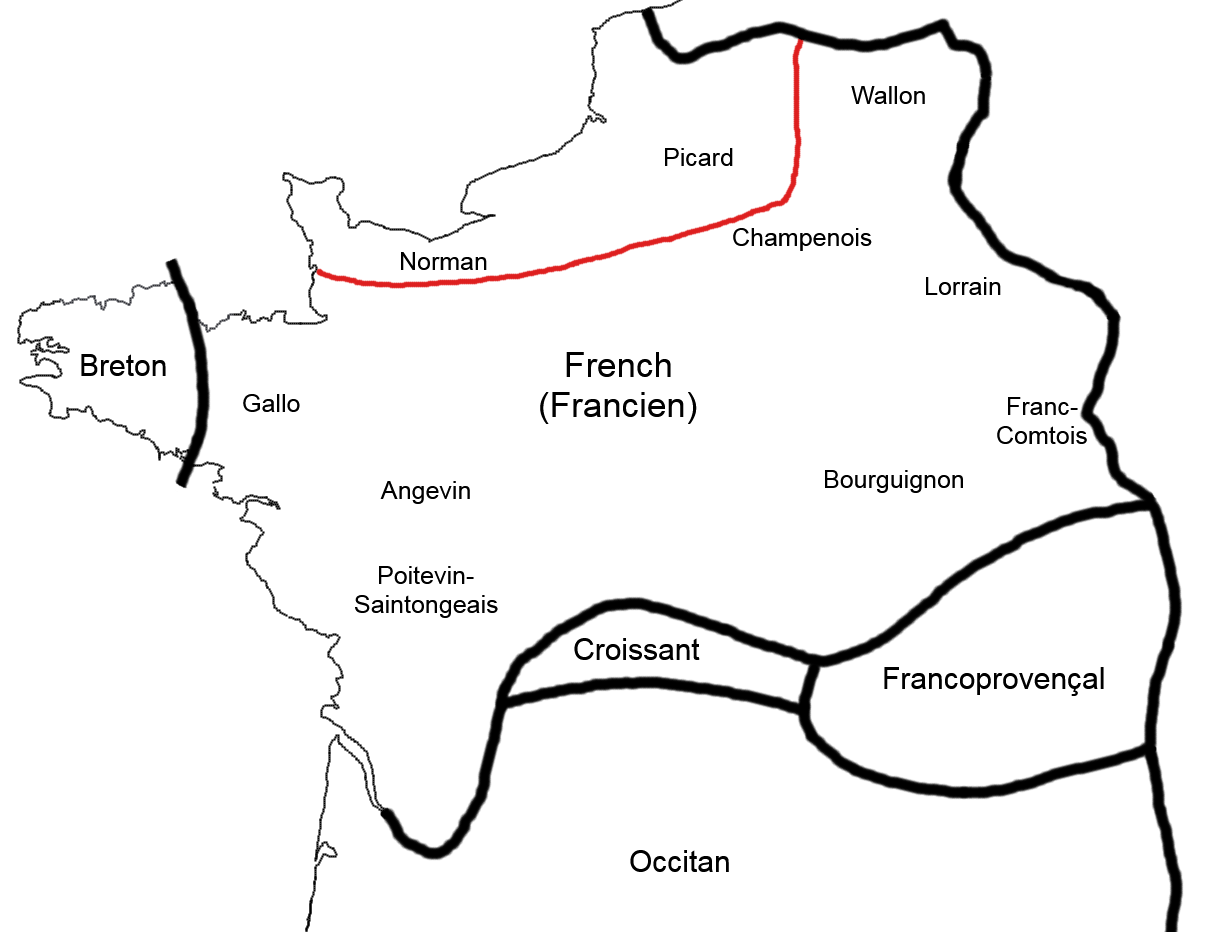
The Joret line (in red), the isogloss north and west of which Latin /k/ and /g/ before /a/ are not palatalised. Cotentinais lies north of the line.

Cotentinais is a dialect of Norman, itself a langue d'oïl within the Gallo-Romance branch of the Romance languages. Norman is conventionally divided into insular Norman, spoken in the Channel Islands, and continental or mainland Norman; the continental dialects are in turn separated by the Joret line into a northern group (also called the domaine normanno-picard) and a southern group. Cotentinais belongs to the northern group and therefore shares its defining features with Cauchois in the Pays de Caux and with the insular varieties, from which it is separated only by the sea. The southern Norman of the Avranchin and the Orne, by contrast, is transitional towards Gallo and the dialects of Maine.

== Geographic distribution and sub-dialects ==
Cotentinais is spoken across the Cotentin, essentially the northern two-thirds of the Manche. The Joret line runs across the base of the peninsula, from around Granville towards Villedieu-les-Poêles and eastward through the bocage, so that nearly all of the Cotentin proper lies within the conservative northern zone.

There is no standardised written form of Norman, and descriptions of the internal variation of Cotentinais are impressionistic rather than the result of a single agreed classification. Local speech is usually grouped by pays: the Haguais of La Hague in the north-west, noted for its strongly guttural aspirated h; the parler of the Val de Saire in the north-east; the Coutançais around Coutances; and the Baupteis of the marshland around Bauptois, between Carentan and La Haye-du-Puits. The dialectologist René Lepelley, who made the fullest modern study of the Val de Saire, regarded that district and La Hague as among the most conservative Norman parlers anywhere in Normandy. The urban speech of Cherbourg is effectively extinct.

== Linguistic features ==
=== The Joret line ===
The single most important feature setting Cotentinais apart from standard French is the absence of the palatalisation described by the Joret line, an isogloss first traced by Charles Joret in 1883. It is in fact a bundle of related sound-correspondences. North of the line, Latin /k/ and /g/ before /a/ remain unpalatalised, where French has /ʃ/ and /ʒ/:

Latin / etymon	Cotentinais	French	English
cattus	cat	chat	cat
caldaria	caudière	chaudière	cauldron
gamba	gambe	jambe	leg
gardinus	gardin	jardin	garden
*captiare	cachi	chasser	to hunt / chase

The same conservatism accounts for a number of Norman-derived words in English, such as cat, candle, catch, cauldron and garden, which entered English from Norman rather than central French. Two further isoglosses in the bundle give /ʃ/ for Latin /k/ before front vowels where French has /s/ (chent for cent "hundred", rachine for racine "root"), and /v/ for Germanic /w/ where French has /g/ (viquet for guichet "wicket", vêpe for guêpe "wasp").

=== Phonology ===
Cotentinais shares several conservative features of the wider "Grand Ouest". Latin stressed free /e/ gives /e/ rather than the French /wa/ (mé "me", dret "right", fei "faith"), and Latin /oː/ and /u/ give /u/ (coue "tail", goule "mouth, gob"). A consonant followed by /l/ is palatalised (kios for clos "enclosure", pieum for plume "feather"), and in the north-west the sequence /je/ advances to /i/ (cachi "to hunt", muchi "to hide"). The nasal vowels /ã/ and /õ/ are strongly and closely articulated.

The dialect preserves a markedly aspirated, sometimes guttural, /h/, at its strongest in La Hague, whose name is pronounced /χɑːɡ/; the same pronunciation was formerly heard much further east, surviving around Honfleur into the early 20th century. Scholars are divided over whether the aspiration reflects the Germanic (Frankish and Norse) settlement or later contact with English in the Anglo-Norman period.

Several outcomes vary across the peninsula, one of the clearest markers of its internal division. The group written -ien reduces to /i/ in the Nord-Cotentin, where byin "well" is pronounced [bi] and quyin "dog" [tʃi], but keeps a nasal vowel elsewhere; -aun is roughly [ã] (maunté "coat") except in the Centre-Cotentin around Carentan, Portbail and Périers, where it is [ɛ̃]; -oun is a long [õ] (quétoun "donkey"); and the indefinite article eun "a" is [ɛ̃] (eun cat "a cat"). Unaccented final e is silent, and in connected speech the plural article merges with a following vowel (les houmes "the men" is pronounced roughly [lzum]).

=== Vocabulary and the Norse element ===
The most distinctive part of the Cotentinais lexicon is the layer of words inherited from the Old Norse of the Scandinavian settlers, concentrated in the vocabulary of the sea, the coast and the land. Examples include:

Cotentinais	Meaning	Old Norse etymon
mielle	sand dune	melr
hougue, hogue	mound, hillock	haugr
hague	enclosure, rough pasture	hagi
grunne	underwater shoal	grunnr
écore	steep bank	skorr
falle	bird's crop, gullet	falr
super	to sip, drink	supa
viquet	wicket-gate	(Germanic)
houle	hollow or sea-cave in the rocks	hol
ber	rock, reef	berg
estran	foreshore, tidal strand	strönd
vraic	seaweed gathered for manure	(Germanic)

The maritime and rural vocabulary of Norse origin has been the subject of dedicated study, and the grammatical gender assigned to these Norse loanwords in Norman was analysed by Albert Sjögren. The same Norse stratum is visible in Cotentin place-names, in elements such as -tot (a homestead, from topt), -bec (a stream, from bekkr), -hou and -homme (an islet, from holmr) and -dal (a valley, from dalr). Alongside the Norse layer, Cotentinais keeps many words of the wider Grand Ouest and of Old French that have vanished from standard French; conversely, a number of words now felt to be ordinary French, such as itou ("likewise"), were themselves borrowed from Norman.

=== Morphology ===
Like the rest of Norman, Cotentinais nouns have two genders, masculine and feminine, and no case inflection. A widespread Norman trait is the use of the subject pronoun nos for the first person plural, conjugated like the third person singular. Verbs have infinitives in -er and -i (cachi "to hunt", muchi "to hide"), and a characteristic haplology affects common interrogatives, so that avez-vous ("do you have") becomes avous and voulez-vous ("do you want") becomes voulous. As generally in the langues d'oïl, negation may be reinforced by a noun denoting a small quantity: besides ne...pas, Cotentinais uses ne...mie and ne...mèche, and the emphatic ne...pièche ("not at all", literally "not a scrap"), which in some local speech extends to the sense "nothing" or "no one".

=== Verbs ===
Verbs are grouped by their infinitive ending, chiefly -er and -i (happer "to catch", muchi "to hide"). In the normalised spelling many first-conjugation infinitives are written -aer, a convention for an ending pronounced differently from one district to another, so that acataer "to buy" is realised [akato] in the Val de Saire and [akatâé] in the Coutançais. The subject pronouns are je "I", tu "you", i "he" (il before a vowel), o "she" (ol before a vowel), no (the indefinite "one", also used for "we"), vos "you" (plural) and i/o "they"; characteristically for Norman, the first person plural is expressed with je together with a plural verb ending, so that je soumes means "we are" and j'avouns "we have". The present indicative of the two auxiliaries is:

Person	yête ("to be")	aveir ("to have")
1st singular	je sis	j'i
2nd singular	t'es	t'as
3rd singular	il / ol est	il / ol a
1st plural	je soumes	j'avouns
2nd plural	vos êtes	vos avaez
3rd plural	il / ol sount	il / ol ount

Fuller conjugations, in the imperfect, preterite, future, conditional and subjunctive, appear in teaching materials and community grammars, but no complete paradigm specific to Cotentinais, as distinct from Norman generally, has been established in the scholarly literature.

== Orthography ==
Norman has never possessed a single traditional orthography, and 19th-century authors each spelled the language in their own way. From the late 1940s the Cotentin scholar Fernand Lechanteur devised a "normalised" spelling (orthographe normalisée) for continental Norman. Its purpose was not to merge the various parlers into one standard but to supply consistent, rationalised conventions within which each locality could still be read in its own pronunciation and retain its own words. Three standardised orthographies are in use today: the Lechanteur system for continental Norman, including Cotentinais; the spelling of the Jèrriais dictionaries (Le Maistre, 1966; Société Jersiaise, 2005); and the Guernésiais spelling of the De Garis dictionary (1982).

== Examples ==
The phrases below illustrate the dialect, with a standard-French equivalent and an English gloss.

Greetings and courtesy:

- Boujou, Byin le bouojou (French bonjour, bien le bonjour): "hello", "good day to you".

Sayings and proverbs:

- L'amour ch'est coume la gale, cha peut paé s'muchi (French l'amour, c'est comme la gale, ça ne peut pas se cacher): "love is like the itch, it cannot be hidden".
- Quaund il plleut, ch'est sène de mâovais temps (French quand il pleut, c'est signe de mauvais temps): "when it rains, it is a sign of bad weather".
- Broussins dauns les avents, byin des poumes ès Normaunds (French du crachin pendant l'avent, beaucoup de pommes pour les Normands): "drizzle in Advent, plenty of apples for the Normans".

The features of the Joret line can be heard in a sentence such as marchez trachier la pouque (French allez chercher le sac, "go and fetch the sack"), which keeps the verb trachier "to fetch" and the unpalatalised velar of pouque "sack"; compare the pairs cat (chat "cat"), vaque (vache "cow"), quyin (chien "dog"), câté (château "castle") and vêpe (guêpe "wasp").

== History ==
Norman took shape when the Old Norse-speaking settlers who founded the Duchy of Normandy from 911 adopted the Gallo-Romance speech of the country, adding to it a superstrate of Norse words together with some Old English elements along the coast. Norse is reported to have survived on the Norman coast into the 12th century. After the Norman Conquest of 1066 the dialect was carried to England as Anglo-Norman, but the loss of continental Normandy to the French crown in 1204, and the growing prestige of the French of Paris, gradually reduced Norman to an unwritten regional patois.

A literary revival began in the Cotentin in the later 19th century, somewhat later than, and partly inspired by, the parallel movement in the Channel Islands. The Cherbourg songwriter Alfred Rossel (1841–1926) published Norman songs from 1872, and in 1896 the review Le Bouais-Jan was founded by Louis Beuve and François Énault. In 1968 Fernand Lechanteur founded the society Parlers et traditions populaires de Normandie, whose review was renamed Le Viquet in 1986; it published a generation of Cotentin writers, including the poet-priest Côtis-Capel (Albert Lohier, 1915–1986) of La Hague, Lechanteur himself (under the pen name Gires-Ganne), André Louis and Aundré Smilly (Hippolyte Gancel). From about 1950 Lechanteur devised a "normalised" spelling intended to serve all the Norman parlers while allowing each to be read in its own pronunciation.

== Literature ==
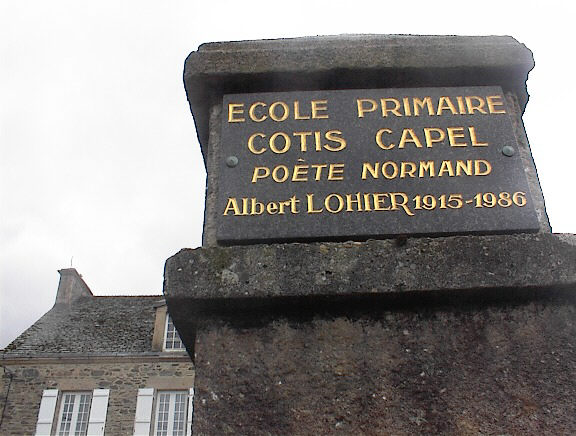
A school at Beaumont-Hague named after Côtis-Capel, the leading Cotentin poet of the 20th century, who wrote in the Haguais form of the dialect.

The best-known work in Cotentinais is Alfred Rossel's song Sus la mé ("On the sea"), which is often treated as an unofficial anthem of the Cotentin. Louis Beuve's poem La Graind' Lainde de Lessay ("The great heath of Lessay") is another celebrated piece, and the collections of Côtis-Capel, among them Rocâles (1951) and À Gravage (1965), are regarded as the peak of 20th-century Cotentin poetry. Since 1989 the association Magène has set many of these poems, including much of Côtis-Capel's work, to newly composed music.

== Present status ==
=== Number of speakers ===
There is no reliable count of Cotentinais speakers specifically. Estimates for Norman as a whole vary widely and are mostly undated: Ethnologue gives about 19,000, the association Magène cites around 25,000 speakers in Normandy, and a figure of 50,000 is sometimes quoted without a source. The only official survey, the 1999 enquête famille conducted by INSEE and INED, counted the langues d'oïl only as a group, and gives no separate figure for Norman.

=== Endangerment and status ===
UNESCO classifies Norman as severely endangered, a status the Normandy regional council renders as the language being "in great danger". Transmission within families is largely broken, and the language is maintained chiefly by enthusiasts and cultural bodies. Norman has no official status in France: it appears among the langues d'oïl in Bernard Cerquiglini's 1999 report on the languages of France and is covered by the patrimonial recognition of regional languages added to the Constitution in 2008, but it is not part of the ordinary school curriculum. Its promotion rests with associations such as Magène and the federation FALE, the review Le Viquet, and the Université populaire normande du Cotentin; the University of Caen Normandy offers a diploma including instruction in Norman dialectology, and a weekly programme in Norman is broadcast on France Bleu Cotentin.

== See also ==
- Norman language
- Jèrriais
- Cauchois
- Joret line
- Côtis-Capel

== Bibliography ==
- Charles Joret, Essai sur le patois normand du Bessin, suivi d'un dictionnaire étymologique, Paris, Vieweg, 1881.
- Charles Birette, Dialecte et légendes du Val de Saire, 1927.
- Patrice Brasseur, Atlas linguistique et ethnographique normand, 4 vols., Paris, CNRS, 1980–2011.
- André Dupont, Dictionnaire des patoisants du Cotentin, Saint-Lô, Société d'archéologie et d'histoire de la Manche, 1992.
- Fernand Lechanteur, La Normandie traditionnelle, 2 vols., Coutances, OCEP, 1983.
- René Lepelley, Dictionnaire du français régional de Normandie, Paris, Bonneton, 1993 ISBN 9782862531502.
- Jean-Louis Vaneille, Les patoisants bas-normands, Saint-Lô.
