= Cauchois =

Cauchois could refer to:

- Yvette Cauchois, 1908–1999, French physicist
- Cauchois dialect, a Norman dialect
- The Cauchois horse, an extinct French horse breed
