= Petit suisse =

French Cheese

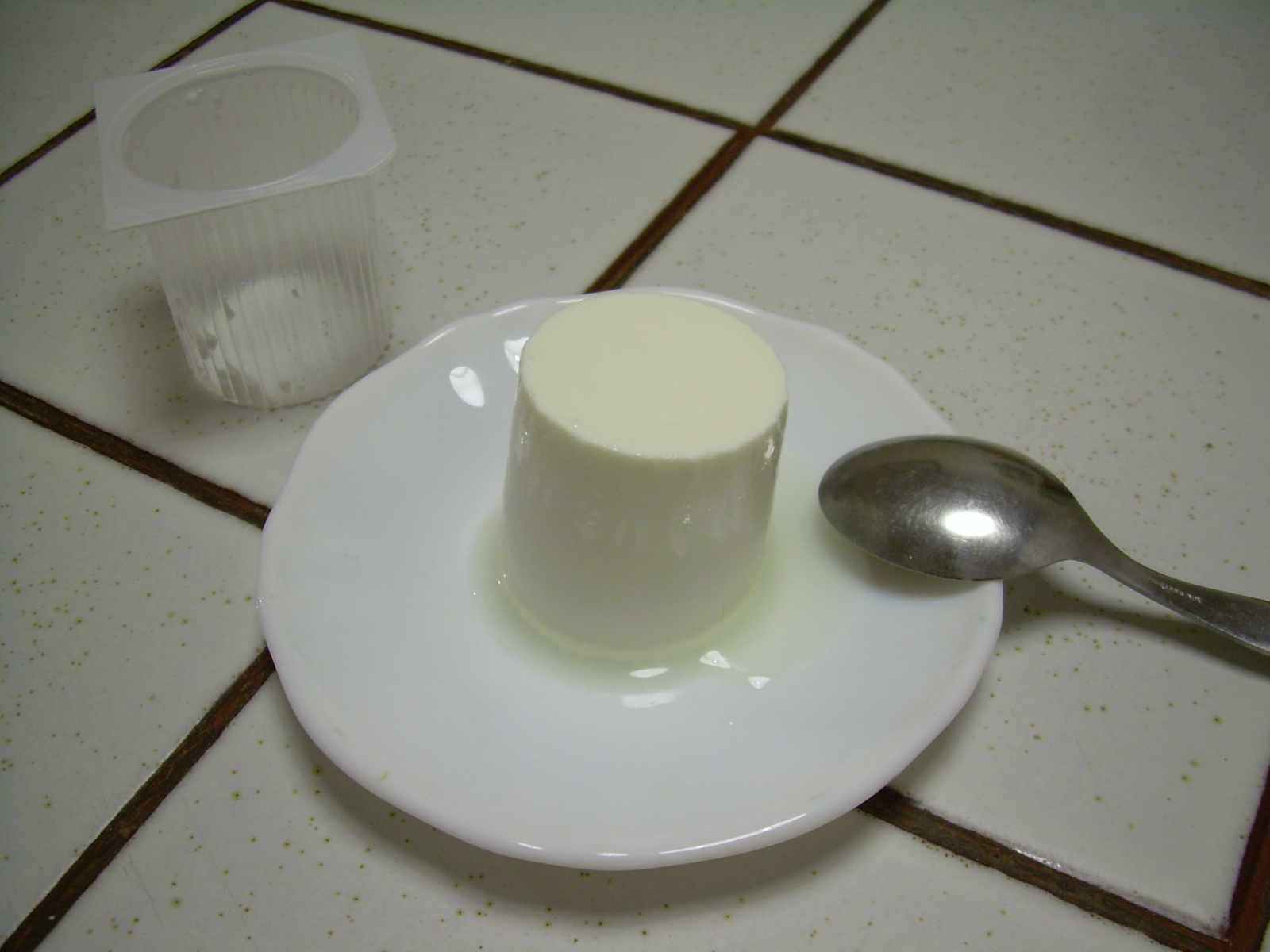
- Country of origin: France
- Region, town: Normandy, Auvilliers
- Source of milk: Cows
- Pasteurised: Yes
- Texture: Smooth, creamy
- Aging time: ?
- Certification: N/A

Petit-suisse (meaning "little Swiss cheese") is a French cheese from the Normandy region.

== Production and use ==
Petit-suisse is a fromage frais, an unripened, unsalted, smooth, and creamy cheese with a texture closer to a very thick yogurt than a typical cheese. It is made from cow's milk enriched with cream so that its dry solids contain about 40% fat content (around 10% in the actual product eaten). The cheese is then smoothed and drained in a centrifuge. A typical cheese weighs 30 or 60 grams and is packaged in a cylinder around 4 cm high and 3 cm diameter or 5 cm by 4 cm in the larger size.

Petit-suisse may be consumed with sugar, as a dessert either on its own or with jam or honey, or salted and peppered with herbs. It is also used in meat stuffings. A mixture of petit-suisse and mustard is sometimes applied to rabbit to prevent the meat from drying during cooking.

== History and development ==
Contrary to what its name suggests, petit-suisse did not originate in Switzerland, but in Normandy, where in the 1850s, a Swiss employee at a dairy in Auvilliers (Normandy) suggested adding cream to enrich the curd used for cheese.

Originally, it was sold in a thin paper wrapping and packaged in wooden boxes, six to a box. The cheeses weighed 60 grams each and were called simply "suisse" (Swiss). Today, they are made throughout France. Though the 60-g version is often seen labelled petit suisse, the term is sometimes reserved for the 30-g ones, the larger ones then being referred to as a double petit-suisse, double suisse, or suisse double.
