= Normandy =

Geographical and cultural region of northwest Europe

Normandy Normandie (French) Normaundie (Norman)
- Geographical region
- Flag Coat of arms
- Interactive map of Normandy
- Coordinates: 48°53′N 0°10′E
- Country: France; Guernsey (Note: Dependency of the British Crown, not part of the United Kingdom but not a sovereign state.); Jersey
- Capitals: Caen; Rouen; Saint Helier; Saint Peter Port
- French Departments and British Crown Dependencies: List: Calvados; Eure; Manche; Orne; Seine-Maritime; Guernsey; Jersey

Area
  - Total: 30,627 km^{2} (11,825 sq mi)

Population (2017)
  - Total: 3,499,280
  - Density: 114.25/km^{2} (295.92/sq mi)
- Demonym: Norman
- Time zones: UTC+01:00 (CET)
  - Summer (DST): UTC+02:00 (CEST)
- UTC+00:00 (GMT)
  - Summer (DST): UTC+01:00 (BST)
- ISO 3166 code: FR-NOR (Mainland) JE and GY (Insular)
- Website: www.normandie.fr

Normandy (Note: (French: Normandie; Norman: Normaundie or Nouormandie) From Old French Normanz, plural of Normant, originally from the word for "northman" in several Scandinavian languages.)) is a geographical and cultural region in northwestern Europe, roughly coextensive with the historical Duchy of Normandy.

Normandy comprises mainland Normandy (a part of France) and insular Normandy (mostly the British Channel Islands). It covers 30,627 square kilometres (11,825 sq mi). Its population in 2017 was 3,499,280. The inhabitants of Normandy are known as Normans; the region is the historic homeland of the Norman language. Large settlements include Rouen, Caen, Le Havre and Cherbourg.

The cultural region of Normandy is roughly similar to the historical Duchy of Normandy, which includes small areas now part of the departments of Mayenne and Sarthe. The Channel Islands (French: Îles Anglo-Normandes) are also historically part of Normandy; they cover 194 square kilometres (75 sq mi) and comprise two bailiwicks: Guernsey and Jersey, which are British Crown Dependencies.

Normandy's name comes from the settlement of the territory by Vikings ("Northmen") starting in the 9th century, and confirmed by treaty in the 10th century between King Charles III of France and the Viking jarl Rollo. For almost 150 years following the Norman conquest of England in 1066, Normandy and England were linked by having the same person reign as both Duke of Normandy and King of England.

== History ==
Normandy has been inhabited since prehistoric times, with archaeological evidence including cave art, megalithic monuments and extensive Bronze Age settlements. During antiquity the region formed part of Celtic Armorica and was occupied by several Gallic peoples before being conquered by the Romans by 51 BC. Under Roman rule it became part of Lugdunensis Secunda, a province whose boundaries would later influence the development of Normandy and was incorporated into the Saxon Shore. Following the collapse of Roman authority, the region passed under Frankish control and became integrated into the kingdoms of Neustria and later the Carolingian Empire.

Normandy takes its name from the Norse settlers known as Northmen who established themselves in the lower Seine valley during the 9th and early 10th centuries. In 911, the Viking leader Rollo reached an agreement with King Charles the Simple in the Treaty of Saint-Clair-sur-Epte, recognising his possession of territory around Rouen in return for military service and conversion to Christianity. Over the following century the Norman rulers expanded their territory, while the Scandinavian settlers gradually assimilated with the local Frankish population to create a distinct Norman identity and the Duchy of Normandy with a highly advanced French culture epitomised by the Norman monastic revival.

The duchy became one of the most influential states in medieval Europe. In 1066, Duke William the Conqueror won the Battle of Hastings and became King of England, creating enduring political, cultural and linguistic links across the English Channel. Norman adventurers and rulers also played major roles in the Norman conquest of southern Italy, the establishment of the Kingdom of Sicily, the Crusades and wider European expansion.

Mainland Normandy was incorporated into the French royal domain in 1204 when King Philip II of France conquered the duchy from John, King of England, although the Channel Islands remained linked to the English Crown. The region kept some of its own character signified by the rights granted in the Norman Charter of 1315, although Normandy was heavily affected by the Hundred Years' War, during which much of Normandy was occupied by England, and later by the French Wars of Religion. From the early modern period onwards Normandy contributed significantly to French maritime exploration and colonisation, producing figures such as Samuel de Champlain and other explorers active in New France.

Following the French Revolution, the historic province was divided into five departments. During the 19th century Normandy experienced industrialisation, the growth of railways and the emergence of seaside tourism. In the Second World War it became the site of the Normandy landings of 6 June 1944 and the subsequent Battle of Normandy, a decisive campaign that contributed to the liberation of France and Western Europe from Nazi Germany. Today Normandy remains one of France's principal historic regions, while the Channel Islands preserve aspects of the duchy's legacy and continue to recognise the British monarch as Duke of Normandy in a traditional and ceremonial sense.

== Geography ==
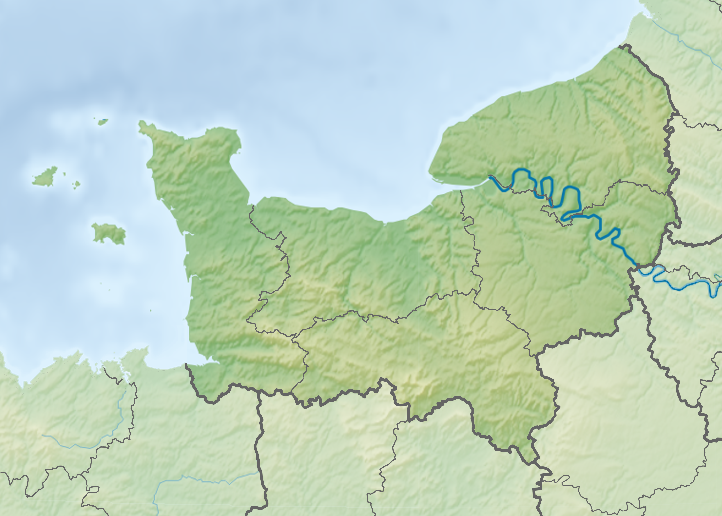
Topographic map of Normandy

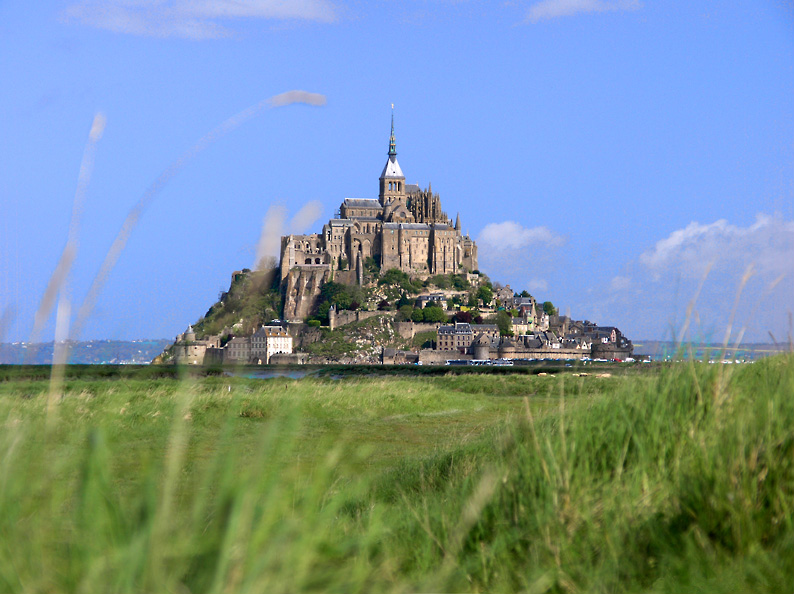
The island of Mont-Saint-Michel, the most visited monument in Normandy

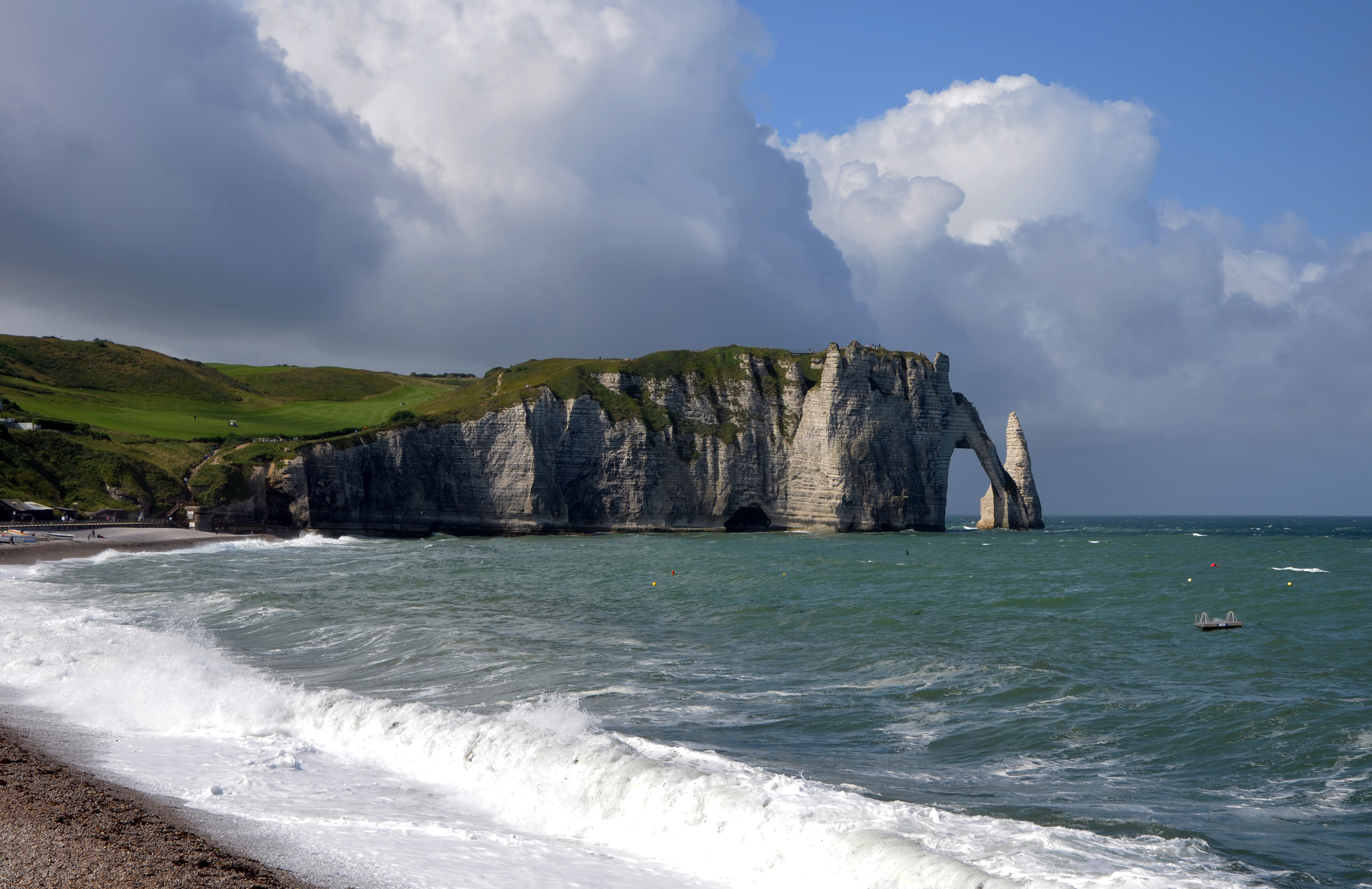
The Arche and the Aiguille of the cliffs of Étretat

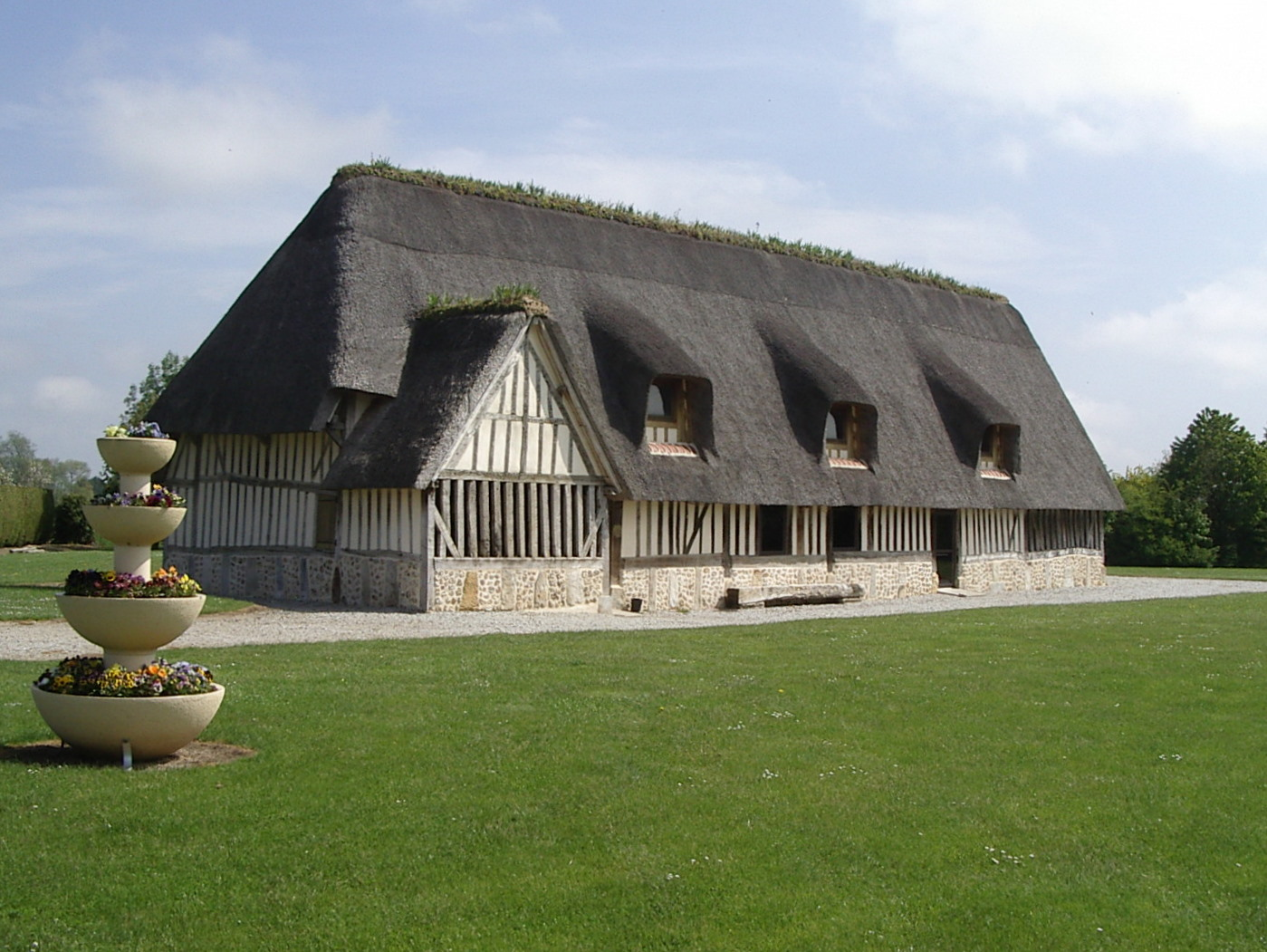
A typical Norman thatched building. This is now a village hall.

The historical Duchy of Normandy was a formerly independent duchy occupying the lower Seine area, the Pays de Caux and the region to the west through the Pays d'Auge as far as the Cotentin Peninsula and Channel Islands.

Western Normandy belongs to the Armorican Massif, while most of the region lies in the Paris Basin. France's oldest rocks are exposed in Jobourg, on the Cotentin peninsula. The region is bounded to the north and west by the English Channel. There are granite cliffs in the west and limestone cliffs in the east. There are also long stretches of beach in the centre of the region. The bocage typical of the western areas caused problems for the invading forces in the Battle of Normandy. A notable feature of the landscape is created by the meanders of the Seine as it approaches its estuary.

The highest point is the Signal d'Écouves (417 m), in the Armorican Massif.

Normandy is sparsely forested: 12.8% of the territory is wooded, compared to a French average of 23.6%, although the proportion varies between the departments. Eure has the most cover, at 21%, while Manche has the least, at 4%, a characteristic shared with the Channel Islands.

=== Sub-regions ===
==== Mainland Normandy ====
- Avranchin
- Bessin
- Bauptois
- Bocage virois
- Campagne d'Alençon
- Campagne d'Argentan
- Campagne de Caen
- Campagne de Falaise
- Campagne du Neubourg
- Campagne de Saint-André (or d'Évreux)
- Cotentin
- Perche
- Domfrontais or Passais
- Hiémois
- Lieuvin
- Mortainais
- Pays d'Auge, central Normandy, is characterized by excellent agricultural land.
- Pays de Bray
- Pays de Caux
- Pays d'Houlme
- Pays de Madrie, area between the Seine and the Eure.
- Pays d'Ouche
- Roumois et Marais-Vernier
- Suisse Normande (Norman Switzerland), in the south, presents hillier terrain.
- Val de Saire
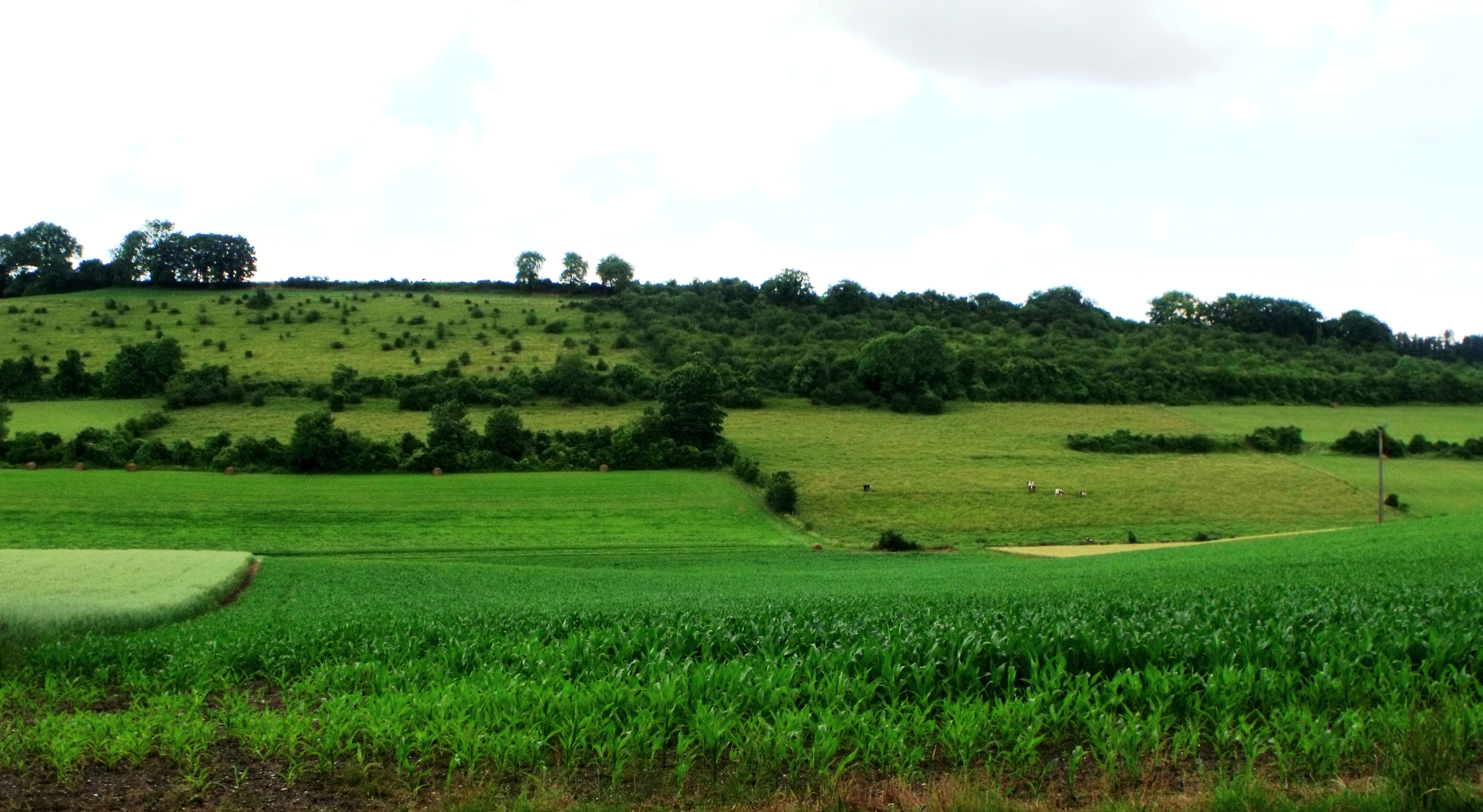
  Normandy countryside
- Vexin normand

==== Insular Normandy (Channel Islands) ====
- The bailiwick of Jersey
- The bailiwick of Guernsey (Fr. Bailliage de Guernesey)

The Channel Islands are considered culturally and historically a part of Normandy. However, they are British Crown Dependencies, and are not part of the modern French administrative region of Normandy.

Although the British abandoned claims to mainland Normandy and other French possessions in 1801, the monarch of the United Kingdom retains the title Duke of Normandy with respect to the Channel Islands. The Channel Islands (except for Chausey) remain Crown Dependencies of the British Crown in the present era. Thus the Loyal Toast in the Channel Islands is Le Roi, notre Duc ("The King, our Duke"). The British monarch is understood not to be the Duke with regard to mainland Normandy as described herein, by virtue of the Treaty of Paris of 1259, the abandonment of claims to France in 1801, and the belief that the rights of succession to that title are subject to Salic Law which excludes inheritance through female heirs.

=== Rivers ===
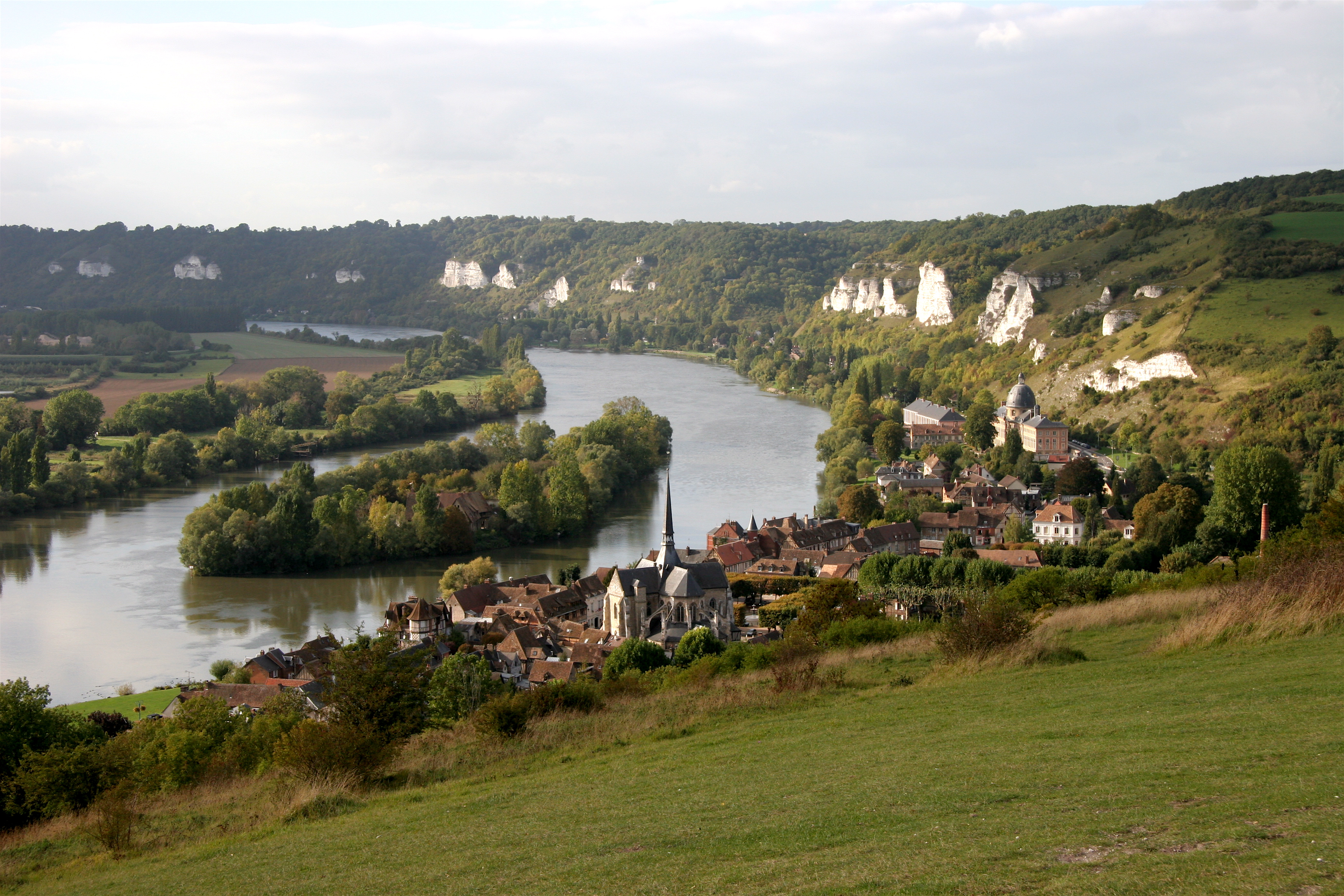
The Seine in Les Andelys

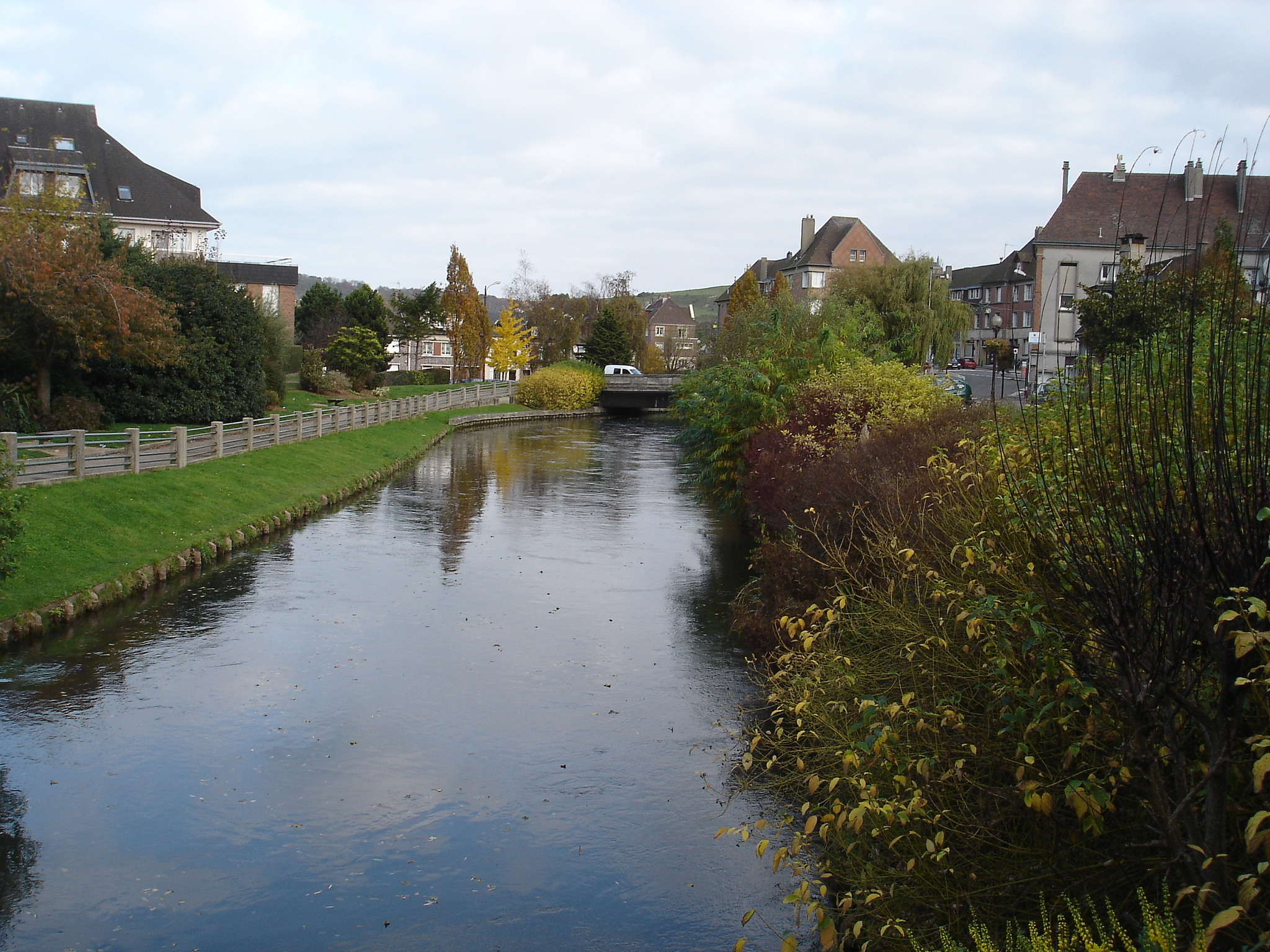
The Bresle

Rivers in Normandy include:

- the Seine and its tributaries:
  - the Andelle
  - the Epte
  - the Eure
  - the Risle
  - the Robec

And many coastal rivers:

- the Bresle
- the Couesnon, which traditionally marks the boundary between the Duchy of Brittany and the Duchy of Normandy
- the Dives
- the Orne
- the Sée
- the Sélune
- the Touques
- the Veules, the shortest French coastal river
- the Vire

== Politics ==
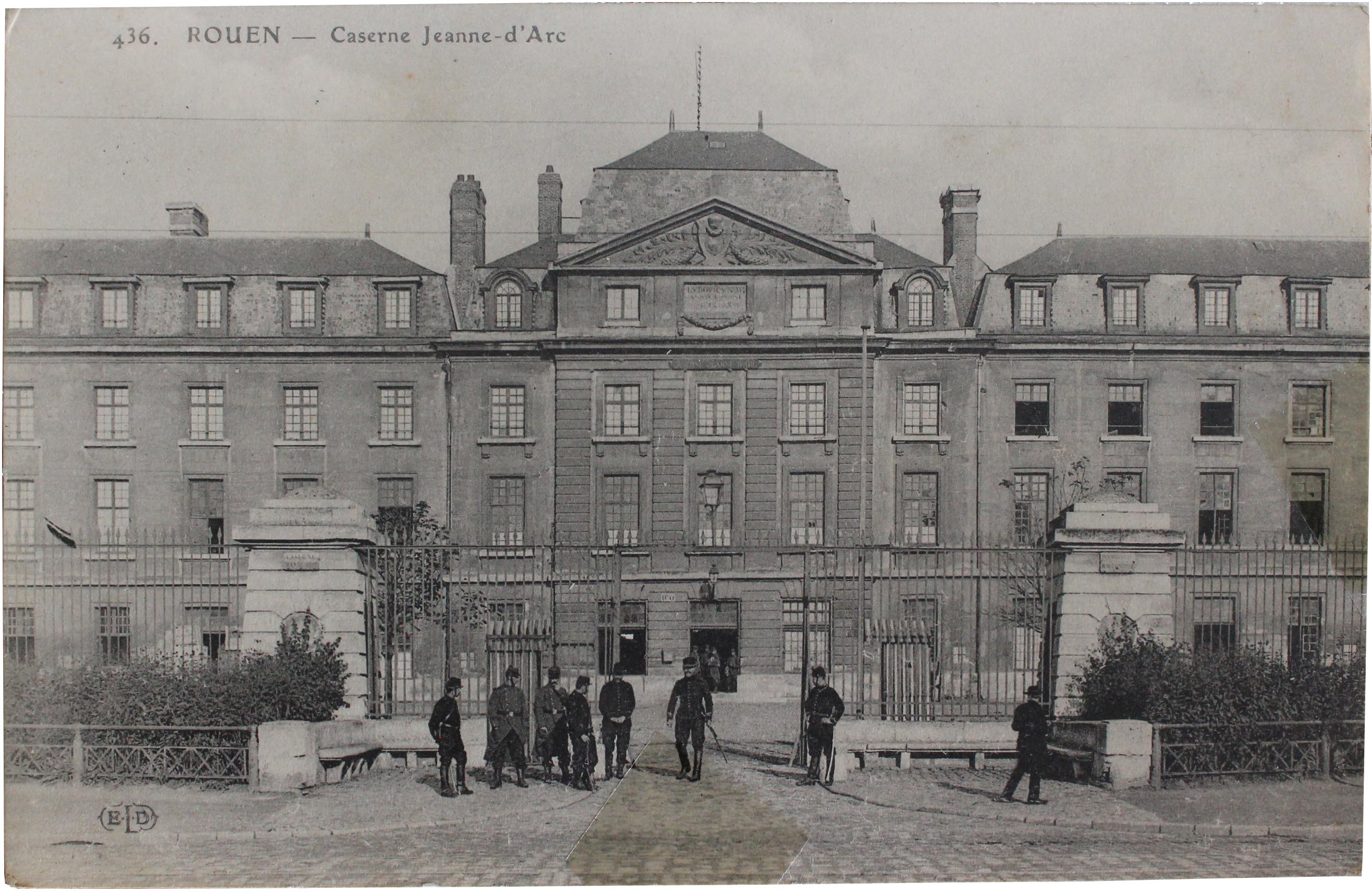
Historic photograph of the Caserne Jeanne d'Arc in Rouen, today seat of the Norman regional assembly

=== Mainland Normandy ===
The modern region of Normandy was created by the territorial reform of French Regions in 2014 by the merger of Lower Normandy, and Upper Normandy. The new region took effect on 1 January 2016, after the regional elections in December 2015.

The Regional Council has 102 members who are elected under a system of proportional representation. The executive consists of a president and vice-presidents. Hervé Morin from the Centre party was elected president of the council in January 2016.

=== Channel Islands ===
The Channel Islands are not part of French territory, but are instead British Crown Dependencies. They are self-governing, each having its own parliament, government and legal system. The head of state of both territories is Charles III and each have an appointed Lieutenant-Governor.

The Bailiwick of Guernsey comprises three separate jurisdictions: Guernsey, Alderney and Sark. Administratively, Herm forms part of Guernsey.

== Economy ==
Much of Normandy is predominantly agricultural in character, with cattle breeding the most important sector (although in decline from the peak levels of the 1970s and 1980s). The bocage is a patchwork of small fields with high hedges, typical of western areas. Areas near the Seine (the former Upper Normandy region) contain a higher concentration of industry. Normandy is a significant cider-producing region, and also produces calvados, a distilled cider or apple brandy. Other activities of economic importance are dairy produce, flax (60% of production in France), horse breeding (including two French national stud farms), fishing, seafood, and tourism. The region contains three French nuclear power stations. There is also easy access to and from the UK using the ports of Cherbourg, Caen (Ouistreham), Le Havre and Dieppe. Jersey and Guernsey are often considered to be tax havens, due to having large financial services sectors and low tax rates.

Area	Year	Labour force in agriculture	Labour force in industry	Labour force in services
Upper Normandy	2003	2.30%	36.10%	61.60%
Lower Normandy	2006	6.50%	25.00%	68.50%
France	2006	2.20%	20.60%	77.20%

Area	GDP (in million of Euros) (2006)	Unemployment (% of the labour force) (2007)
Upper Normandy	46,853	6.80%
Lower Normandy	34,064	7.90%
France	1,791,956	7.50%

== Demographics ==
In January 2006 the population of French Normandy (including the part of Perche which lies inside the Orne département but excluding the Channel Islands) was estimated at 3,260,000 with an average population density of 109 inhabitants per km^{2}, just under the French national average, but rising to 147 for Upper Normandy. The population of the Channel Islands is estimated around 174,000 (2021).

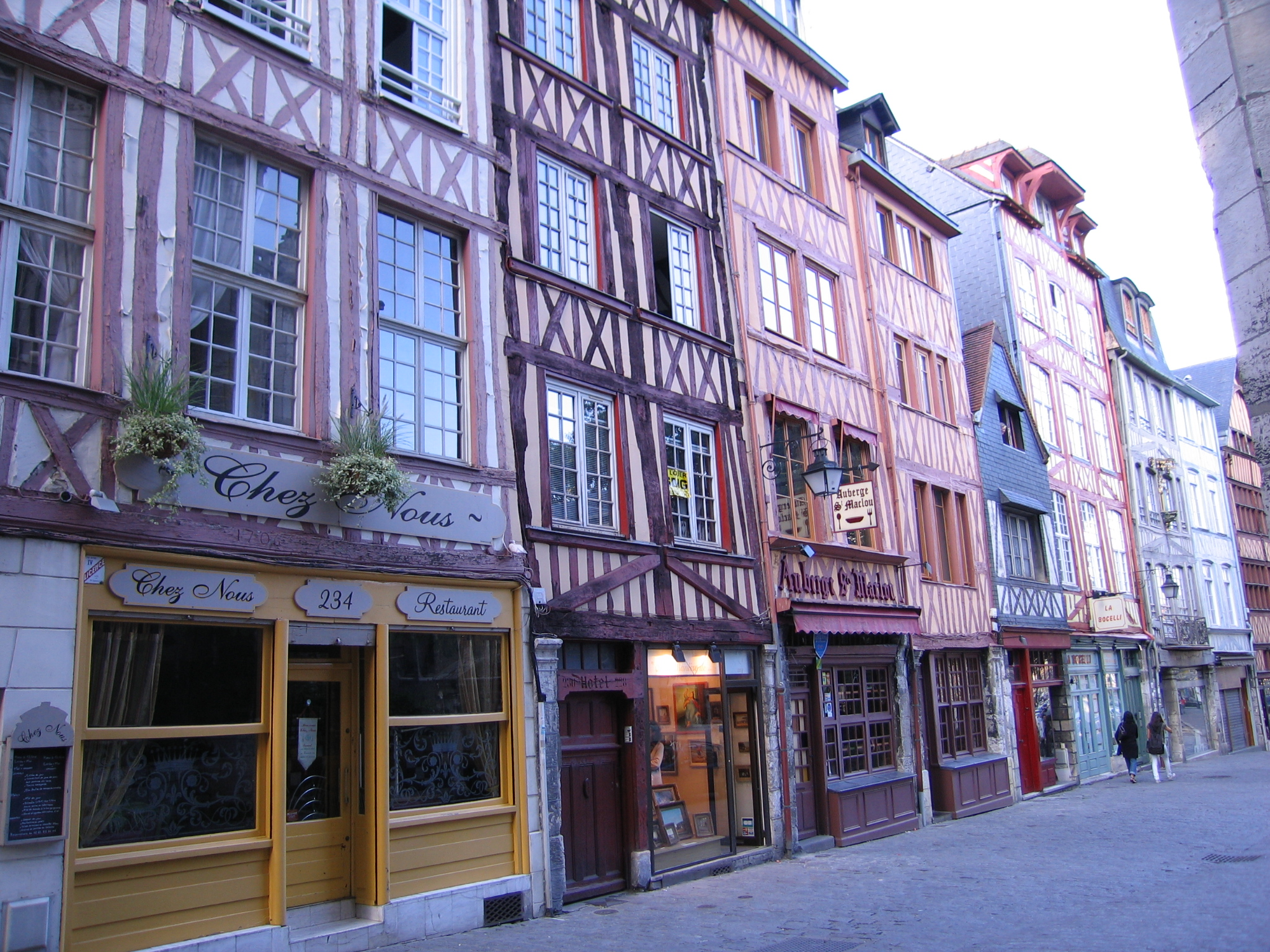
Half-timbered houses in Rouen

The main cities (population given from the 1999 census) are Rouen (518,316 in the metropolitan area), the capital since 2016 of the province and formerly of Upper Normandy; Caen (420,000 in the metropolitan area) and formerly the capital of Lower Normandy; Le Havre (296,773 in the metropolitan area); and Cherbourg (117,855 in the metropolitan area).

== Culture ==
=== Flag ===
The traditional provincial flag of Normandy, gules, two leopards passant or, is used in the region and its predecessors. The three-leopard version (known in the Norman language as les treis cats, "the three cats") is used by some associations and individuals, especially those who support cultural links with the Channel Islands and England. Jersey and Guernsey use three leopards in their national symbols. The leopards represents the strength and courage Normandy has towards the neighbouring provinces.

The unofficial anthem of the region is the song "Ma Normandie".

"Two-leopard" version, which is the main one

"Three-leopard" version

Nordic Cross version

"Two-leopard" flag of Sark

Coat of arms of the Duchy of Normandy

Coat of arms of Guernsey

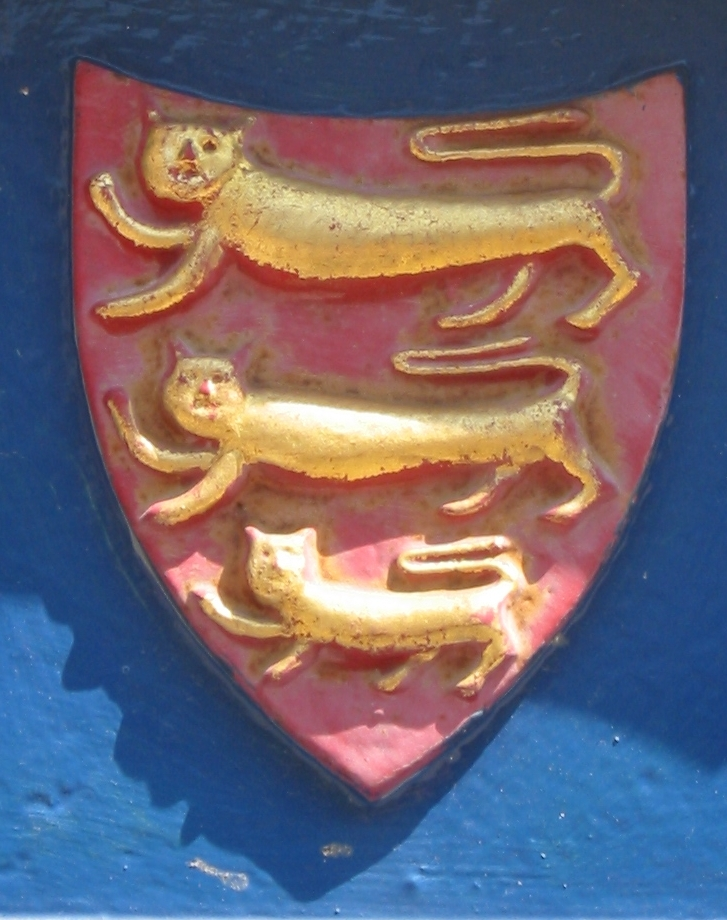
Coat of arms of Jersey

=== Language ===
The Norman language, including its insular variations Jèrriais and Guernésiais, is a regional language, spoken by a minority of the population on the continent and the islands, with a concentration in the Cotentin Peninsula in the far west (the Cotentinais dialect), and in the Pays de Caux in the East (the Cauchois dialect).

Many words and place names demonstrate the Old English and Norse (Anglo-Scandinavian) influence in this Oïl language; for example, words : mauve (seagull), fifotte (starfish), hâ (catshark), mucre (humid, wet), (é)griller (slide, slip), fale (throat), etc. place-names : -bec (stream), -fleur (river), -hou (island), -tot (homestead), -dal / -dalle (valley), Hogue / Hougue (hill, mound), -lon / -londe (grove, wood), -vy / -vic (bay, cove), -mare (pond), -beuf (booth, cabin), etc. French is the only official language in continental Normandy and English is also an official language in the Channel Islands.

=== Architecture ===
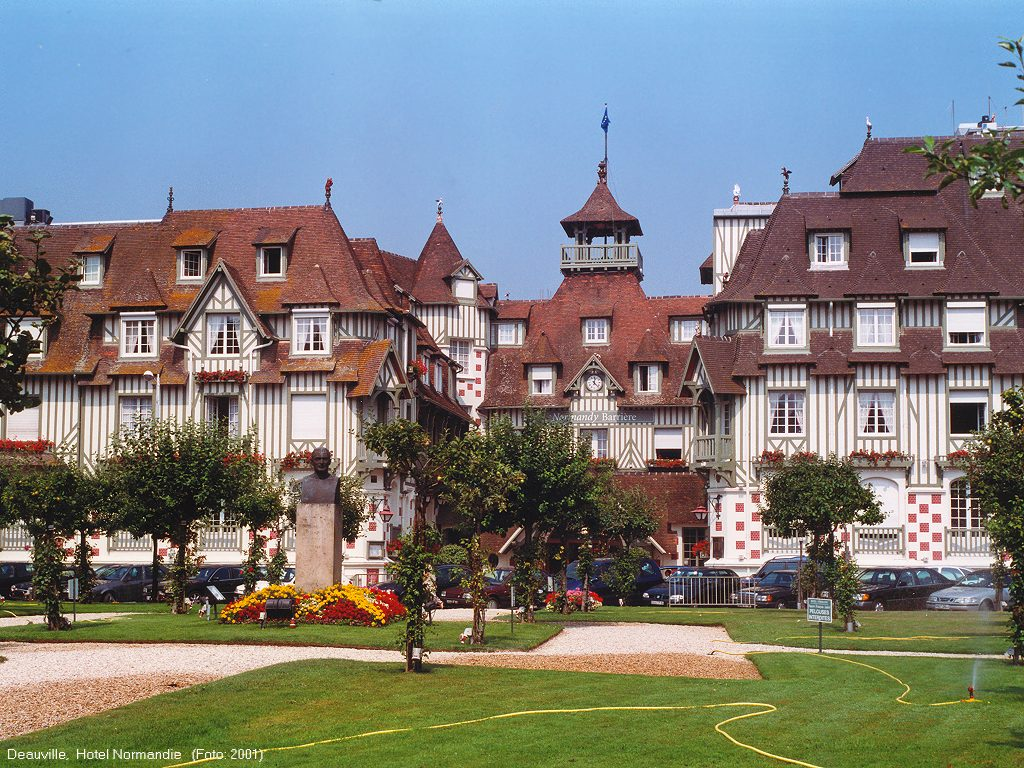
A Norman style construction in Deauville

Architecturally, Norman cathedrals, abbeys (such as the Abbey of Bec) and castles characterise the former duchy in a way that mirrors the similar pattern of Norman architecture in England following the Norman Conquest of 1066.

Domestic architecture in upper Normandy is typified by half-timbered buildings that also recall vernacular English architecture, although the farm enclosures of the more harshly landscaped Pays de Caux are a more idiosyncratic response to socio-economic and climatic imperatives. Much urban architectural heritage was destroyed during the Battle of Normandy in 1944 – post-war urban reconstruction, such as in Le Havre and Saint-Lô, could be said to demonstrate both the virtues and vices of modernist and brutalist trends of the 1950s and 1960s. Le Havre, the city rebuilt by Auguste Perret, was added to Unesco's World Heritage List in 2005.

Vernacular architecture in lower Normandy takes its form from granite, the predominant local building material. The Channel Islands also share this influence – Chausey was for many years a source of quarried granite, including that used for the construction of Mont Saint-Michel.

The south part of Bagnoles-de-l'Orne is filled with bourgeois villas in Belle Époque style with polychrome façades, bow windows and unique roofing. This area, built between 1886 and 1914, has an authentic "Bagnolese" style and is typical of high-society country vacation of the time. The Chapel of Saint Germanus (Chapelle Saint-Germain) at Querqueville with its trefoil floorplan incorporates elements of one of the earliest surviving places of Christian worship in the Cotentin – perhaps second only to the Gallo-Roman baptistry at Port-Bail. It is dedicated to Germanus of Normandy.

=== Gastronomy ===
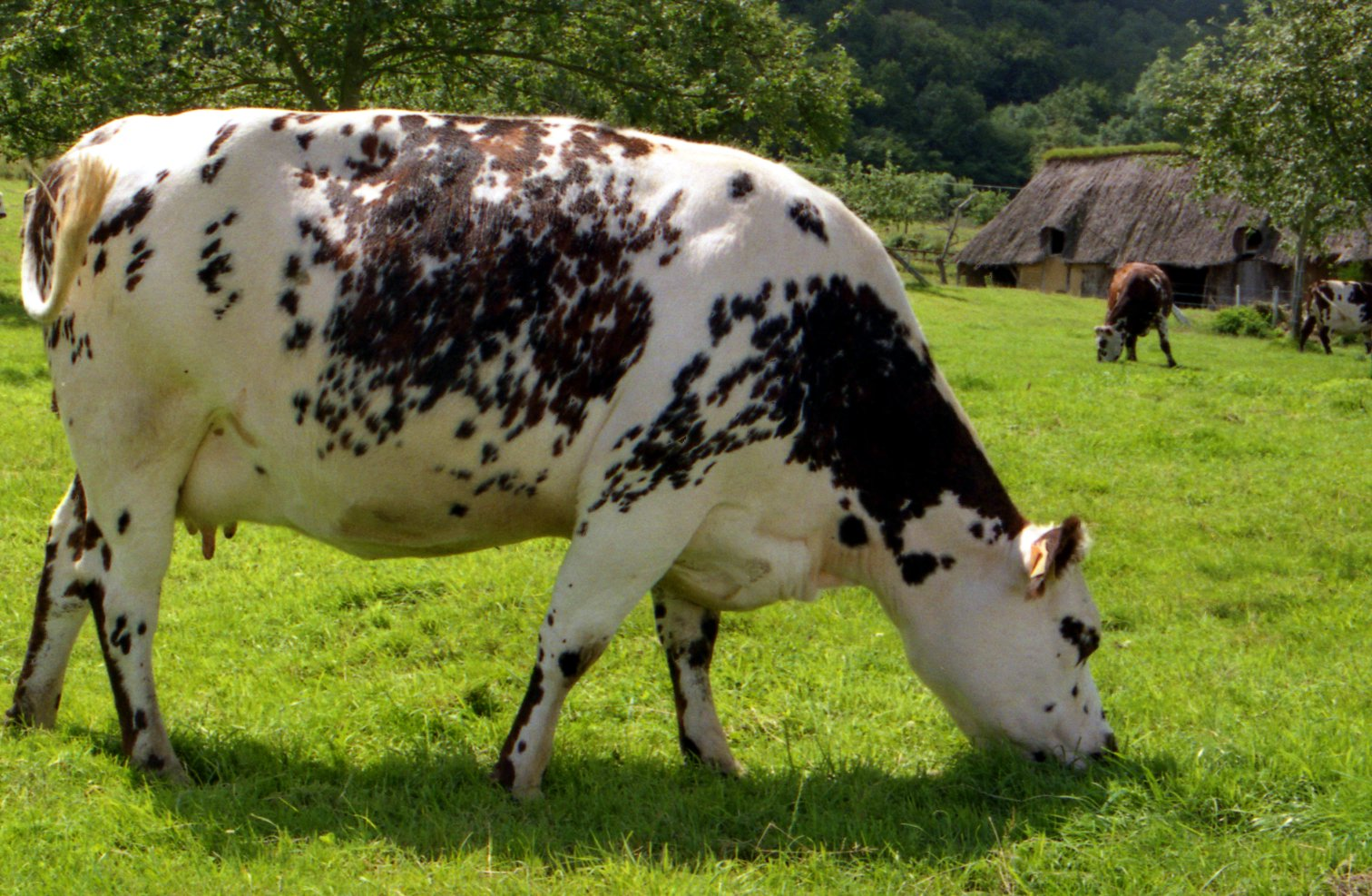
Normande cow

Parts of Normandy consist of rolling countryside typified by pasture for dairy cattle and apple orchards. A wide range of dairy products are produced and exported. Norman cheeses include Camembert, Livarot, Pont l'Évêque, Brillat-Savarin, Neufchâtel, Petit Suisse and Boursin. Normandy butter and Normandy cream are lavishly used in gastronomic specialties. Jersey and Guernsey cattle are famous cattle breeds worldwide, especially to North America.

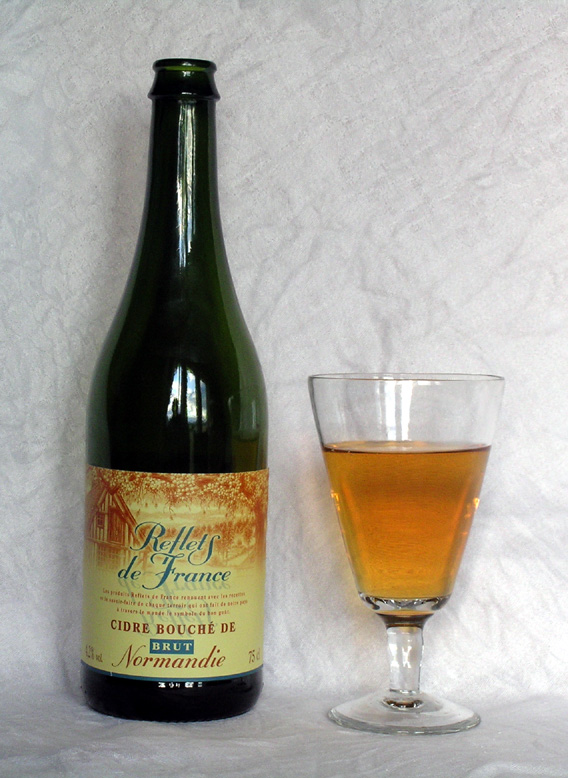
Cider from Normandy

Turbot and oysters from the Cotentin Peninsula are major delicacies throughout France. Normandy is the chief oyster-cultivating, scallop-exporting, and mussel-raising region in France.

Normandy is a major cider-producing region (very little wine is produced). Perry is also produced, but in less significant quantities. Apple brandy, of which the most famous variety is calvados, is also popular. The mealtime trou normand, or "Norman hole", is a pause between meal courses in which diners partake of a glassful of calvados in order to improve the appetite and make room for the next course, and this is still observed in many homes and restaurants. Pommeau is an apéritif produced by blending unfermented cider and apple brandy. Another aperitif is the kir normand, a measure of crème de cassis topped up with cider. Bénédictine is produced in Fécamp.

Other regional specialities include tripes à la mode de Caen, andouilles and andouillettes, salade cauchoise, salt meadow (pré salé) lamb, seafood (mussels, scallops, lobsters, mackerel...), and teurgoule (spiced rice pudding).

Normandy dishes include duckling à la rouennaise, sautéed chicken yvetois, and goose en daube. Rabbit is cooked with morels, or à la havraise (stuffed with truffled pigs' trotters). Other dishes are sheep's trotters à la rouennaise, casseroled veal, larded calf's liver braised with carrots, and veal (or turkey) in cream and mushrooms.

Normandy is also noted for its pastries. Normandy turns out douillons (pears baked in pastry), craquelins, roulettes in Rouen, fouaces in Caen, fallues in Lisieux, sablés in Lisieux. It is the birthplace of brioches (especially those from Évreux and Gisors). Confectionery of the region includes Rouen apple sugar, Isigny caramels, Bayeux mint chews, Falaise berlingots, Le Havre marzipans, Argentan croquettes, and Rouen macaroons.

Normandy is the native land of Taillevent, cook of the kings of France Charles V and Charles VI. He wrote the earliest French cookery book named Le Viandier. Confiture de lait was also made in Normandy around the 14th century.

=== Literature ===
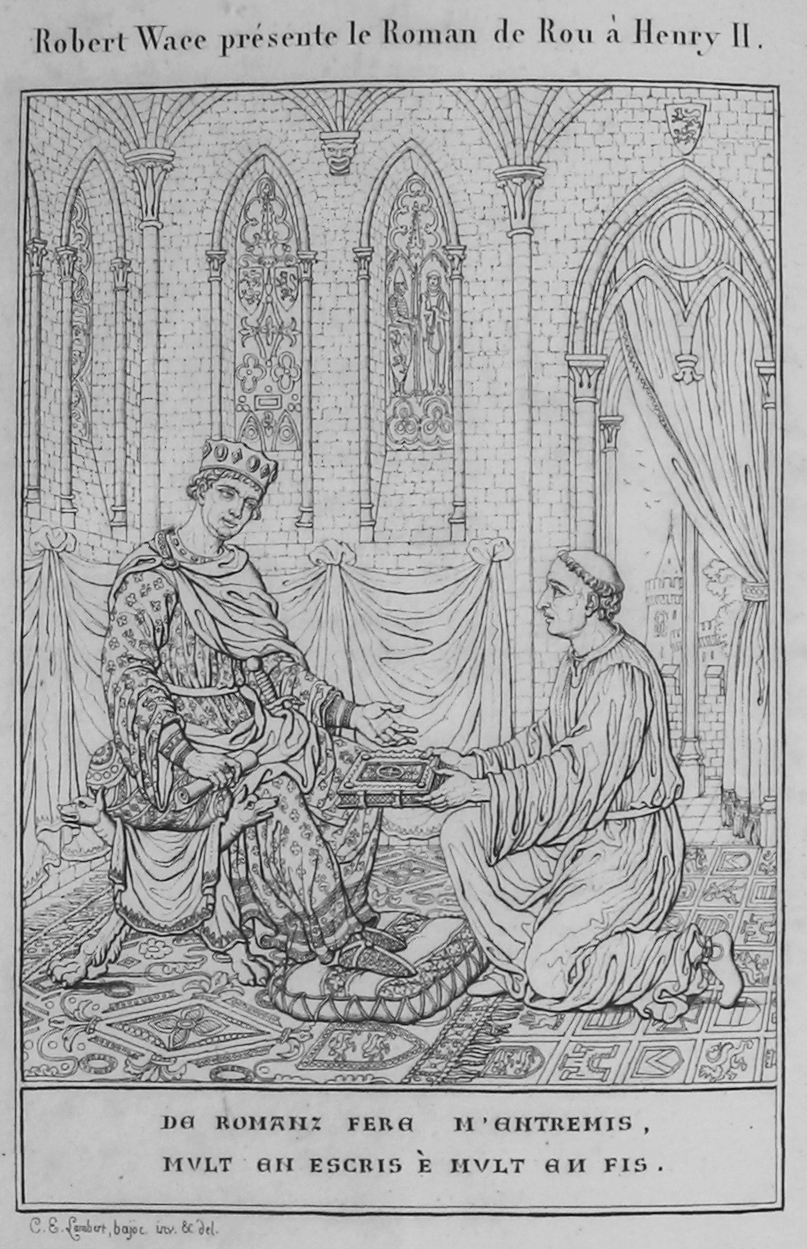
Wace presents his Roman de Rou to Henry II, illustration 1824.

The dukes of Normandy commissioned and inspired epic literature to record and legitimise their rule. Wace, Orderic Vitalis and Stephen of Rouen were among those who wrote in the service of the dukes. After the division of 1204, French literature provided the model for the development of literature in Normandy. Olivier Basselin wrote of the Vaux de Vire, the origin of literary vaudeville. Notable Norman writers include Jean Marot, Rémy Belleau, Guy de Maupassant, Jules Barbey d'Aurevilly, Gustave Flaubert, Octave Mirbeau, and Remy de Gourmont, and Alexis de Tocqueville. The Corneille brothers, Pierre and Thomas, born in Rouen, were great figures of French classical literature.

David Ferrand (1591–1660) in his Muse Normande established a landmark of Norman language literature. In the 16th and 17th centuries, the workers and merchants of Rouen established a tradition of polemical and satirical literature in a form of language called the parler purin. At the end of the 18th century and beginning of the 19th century, a new movement arose in the Channel Islands, led by writers such as George Métivier, which sparked a literary renaissance on the Norman mainland. In exile in Jersey and then Guernsey, Victor Hugo took an interest in the vernacular literature. Les Travailleurs de la mer is a well-known novel by Hugo set in the Channel Islands. The boom in insular literature in the early 19th century encouraged production especially in La Hague and around Cherbourg, where Alfred Rossel, Louis Beuve and Côtis-Capel became active. The typical medium for literary expression in Norman has traditionally been newspaper columns and almanacs. The novel Zabeth by André Louis which appeared in 1969 was the first novel published in Norman.

=== Painting ===
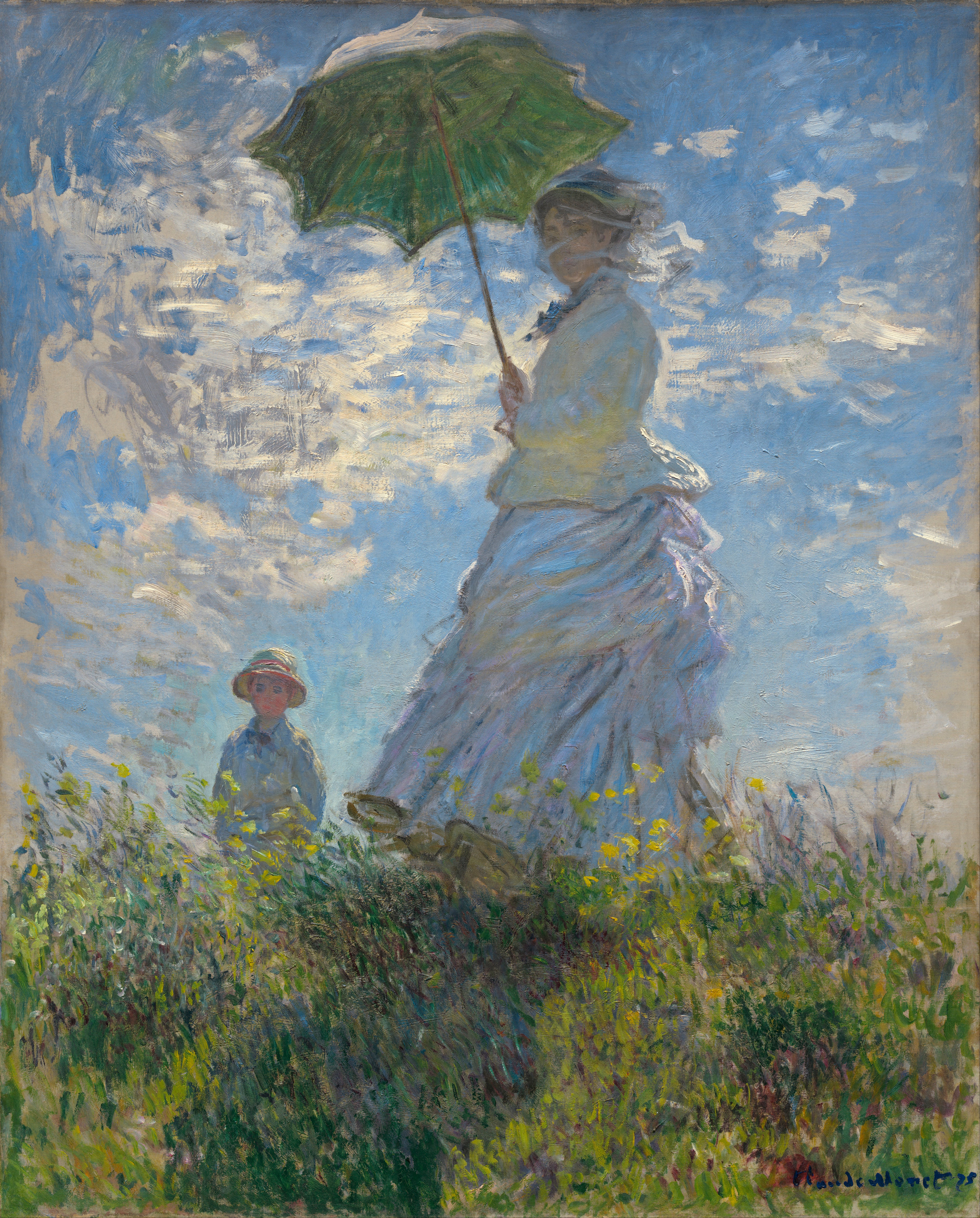
Claude Monet, Woman with a Parasol – Madame Monet and Her Son, 1875

Normandy has a rich tradition of painting and gave to France some of its most important artists.

In the 17th century, some major French painters were Normans like Nicolas Poussin, born in Les Andelys and Jean Jouvenet.

Romanticism drew painters to the Channel coasts of Normandy. Richard Parkes Bonington and J. M. W. Turner crossed the Channel from Great Britain, attracted by the light and landscapes. Théodore Géricault, a native of Rouen, was a notable figure in the Romantic movement, its famous Radeau de la Méduse being considered come the breakthrough of pictorial romanticism in France when it was officially presented at the Salon of 1819. The competing Realist tendency was represented by Jean-François Millet, a native of La Hague. The landscape painter Eugène Boudin, born in Honfleur, was a determining influence on the impressionists and was highly considered by Monet.

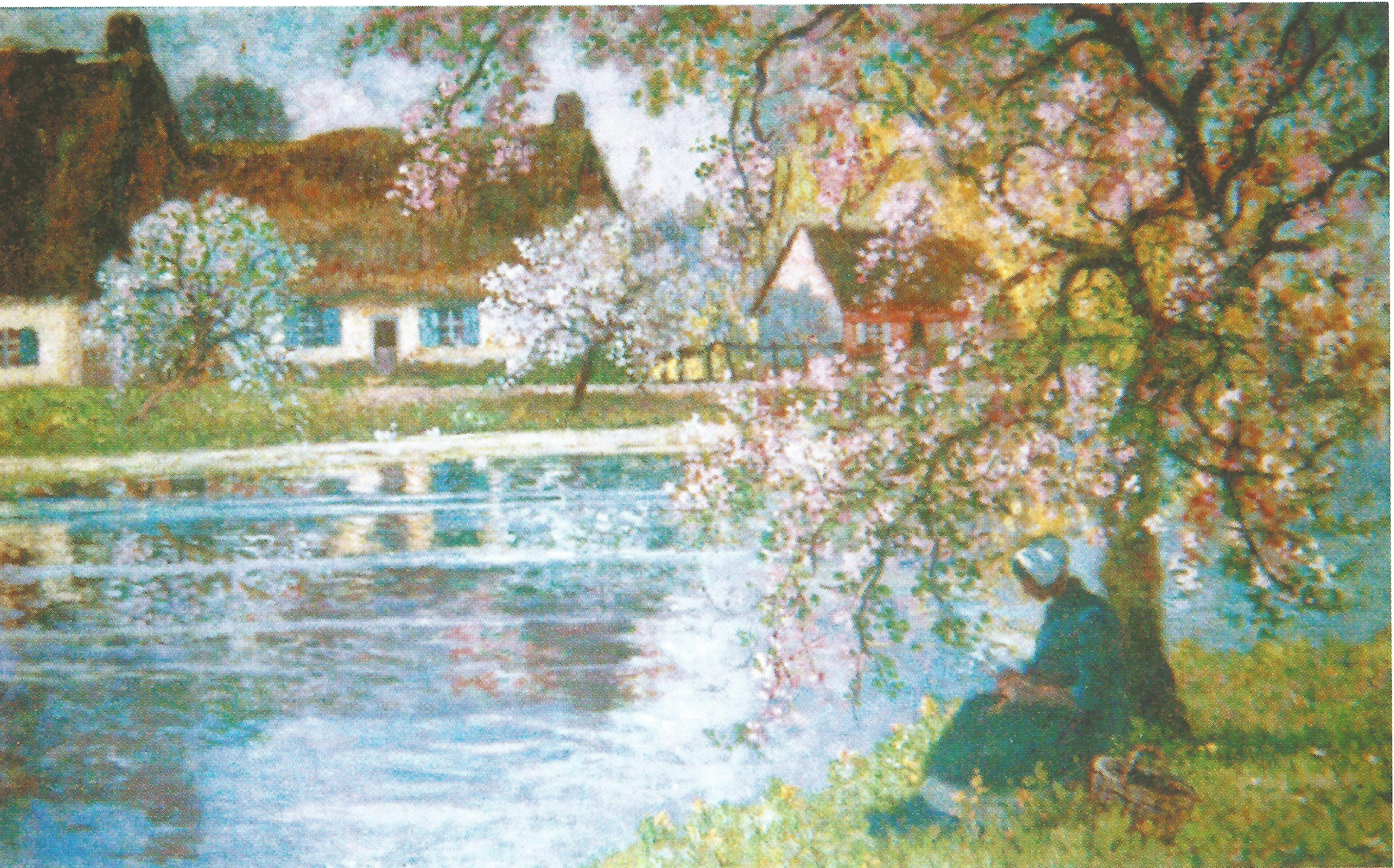
Eugène Chigot (1860–1923), Printemps en Normandie (Springtime in Normandy) (1914/15)

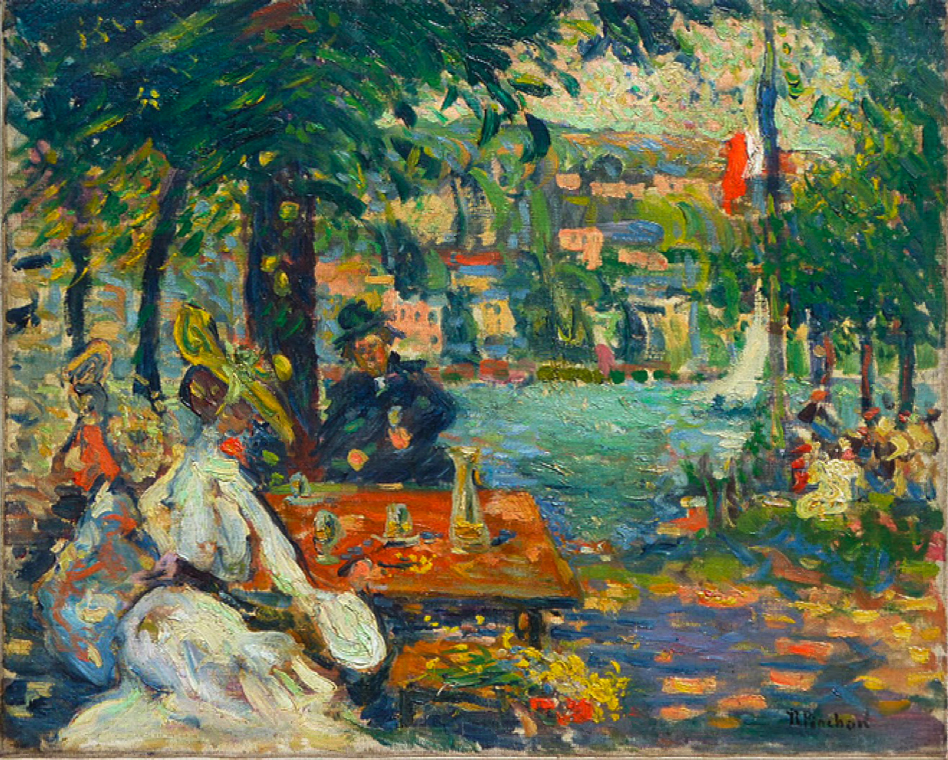
Robert Antoine Pinchon, Un après-midi à l'Ile aux Cerises, Rouen, oil on canvas, 50 x 61.2 cm

Breaking away from the more formalised and classical themes of the early part of the 19th century, Impressionist painters preferred to paint outdoors, in natural light, and to concentrate on landscapes, towns and scenes of daily life.

Leader of the movement and father of modern painting, Claude Monet is one of the best known Impressionists and a major character in Normandy's artistic heritage. His house and gardens at Giverny are one of the region's major tourist sites, much visited for their beauty and their water lilies, as well as for their importance to Monet's artistic inspiration. Normandy was at the heart of his creation, from the paintings of Rouen's cathedral to the famous depictions of the cliffs at Étretat, the beach and port at Fécamp and the sunrise at Le Havre. It was Impression, Sunrise, Monet's painting of Le Havre, that led to the movement being dubbed Impressionism. After Monet, all the main avant-garde painters of the 1870s and 1880s came to Normandy to paint its landscapes and its changing lights, concentrating along the Seine valley and the Norman coast.

Landscapes and scenes of daily life were also immortalised on canvas by artists that have included : William Turner, Gustave Courbet, the Honfleur born Eugène Boudin, Camille Pissarro, Alfred Sisley, Auguste Renoir, Gustave Caillebotte, Eugène Chigot, Paul Gauguin, Georges Seurat, Paul Signac, Pierre Bonnard, Georges Braque and Pablo Picasso. While Monet's work adorns galleries and collections all over the world, a remarkable quantity of Impressionist works can be found in galleries throughout Normandy, such as the Museum of Fine Arts in Rouen, the Musée Eugène Boudin in Honfleur or the André Malraux Museum in Le Havre.

Maurice Denis, one of the leaders and theoricists of the Nabis movement in the 1890s, was a native of Granville, in the department of Manche. Marie-Thérèse Auffray, an expressionist painter and member of the French resistance during WWII, lived and painted in the village of Échauffour.

The Société Normande de Peinture Moderne was founded in 1909 by Pierre Dumont, Robert Antoine Pinchon, Yvonne Barbier and Eugène Tirvert. Among members were Raoul Dufy, a native of Le Havre, Albert Marquet, Francis Picabia and Maurice Utrillo. Also in this movement were the Duchamp brothers, Jacques Villon and Marcel Duchamp, considered one of the father of modern art, also natives of Normandy. Jean Dubuffet, one of the leading French artist of the 1940s and the 1950s was born in Le Havre.

=== Religion ===
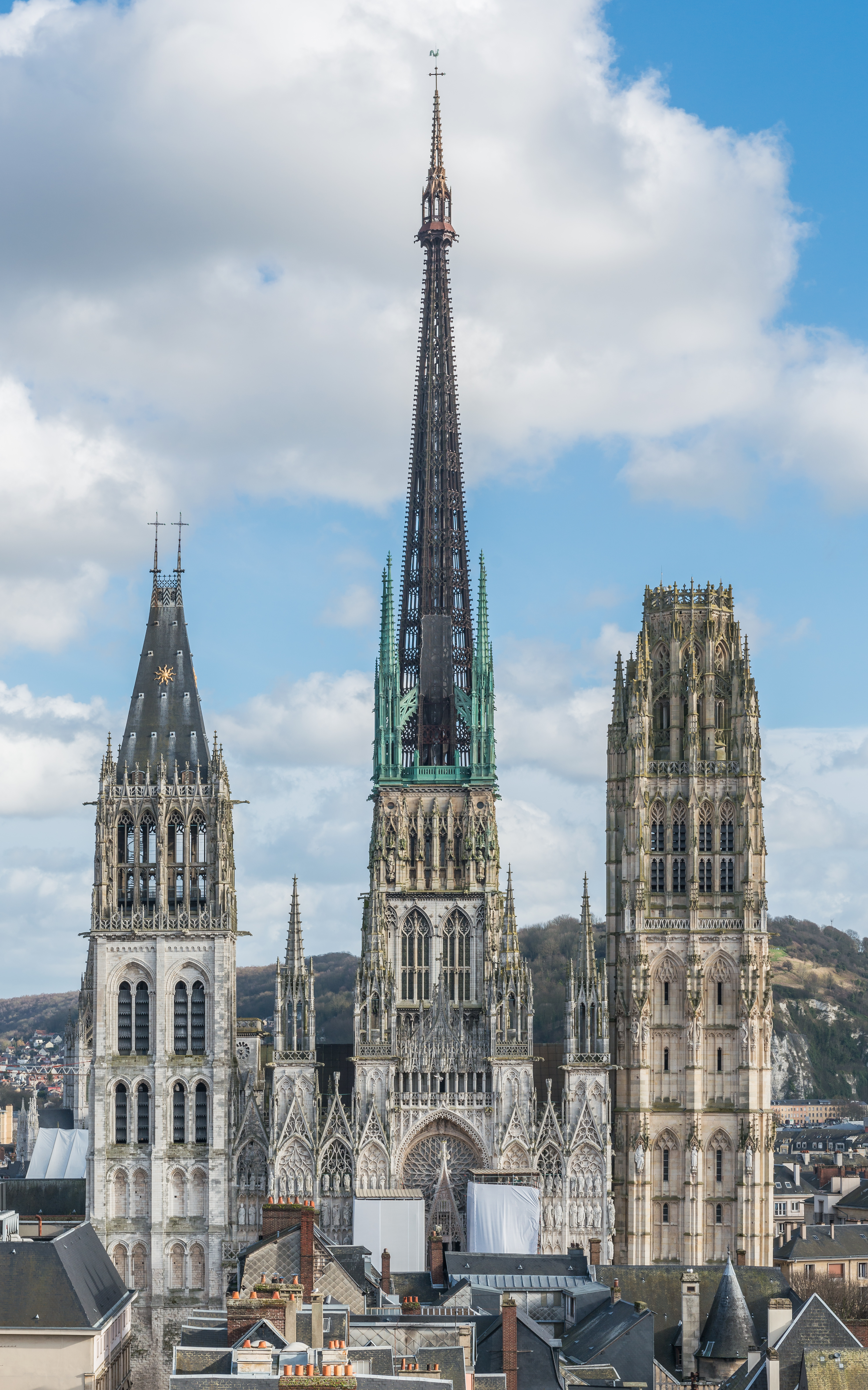
Rouen Cathedral

Christian missionaries implanted monastic communities in the territory in the 5th and 6th centuries. Some of these missionaries came from across the Channel. The influence of Celtic Christianity can still be found in the Cotentin. By the terms of the treaty of Saint-Clair-sur-Epte, Rollo, a Viking pagan, accepted Christianity and was baptised. The Duchy of Normandy was therefore formally a Christian state from its foundation. The cathedrals of Normandy have exerted influence down the centuries in matters of both faith and politics. King Henry II of England did penance at the cathedral of Avranches on 21 May 1172 and was absolved from the censures incurred by the assassination of Thomas Becket. Mont Saint-Michel is a historic pilgrimage site.

Normandy does not have one generally agreed patron saint, although this title has been ascribed to Saint Michael, and to Saint Ouen. Many saints have been revered in Normandy down the centuries, including:

- Aubert who's remembered as the founder of Mont Saint-Michel
- Marcouf and Laud who are important saints in Normandy
- Helier and Samson of Dol who are evangelizers of the Channel Islands
- Thomas Becket, an Anglo-Norman whose parents were from Rouen, who was the object of a considerable following in mainland Normandy following his martyrdom
- Joan of Arc who was martyred in Rouen, and who is especially remembered in that city
- Thérèse de Lisieux whose birthplace in Alençon and later home in Lisieux are a focus for religious pilgrims.
- Germanus of Normandy

Since the 1905 French law on the Separation of the Churches and the State, there is no established church in mainland Normandy. In the Channel Islands, the Church of England is the established church.

=== People ===
See Category:People from Normandy

== See also ==
- Integration of Normandy into the royal domain of the Kingdom of France
