= Fernand Lechanteur =

French poet, linguist, and ethnologist

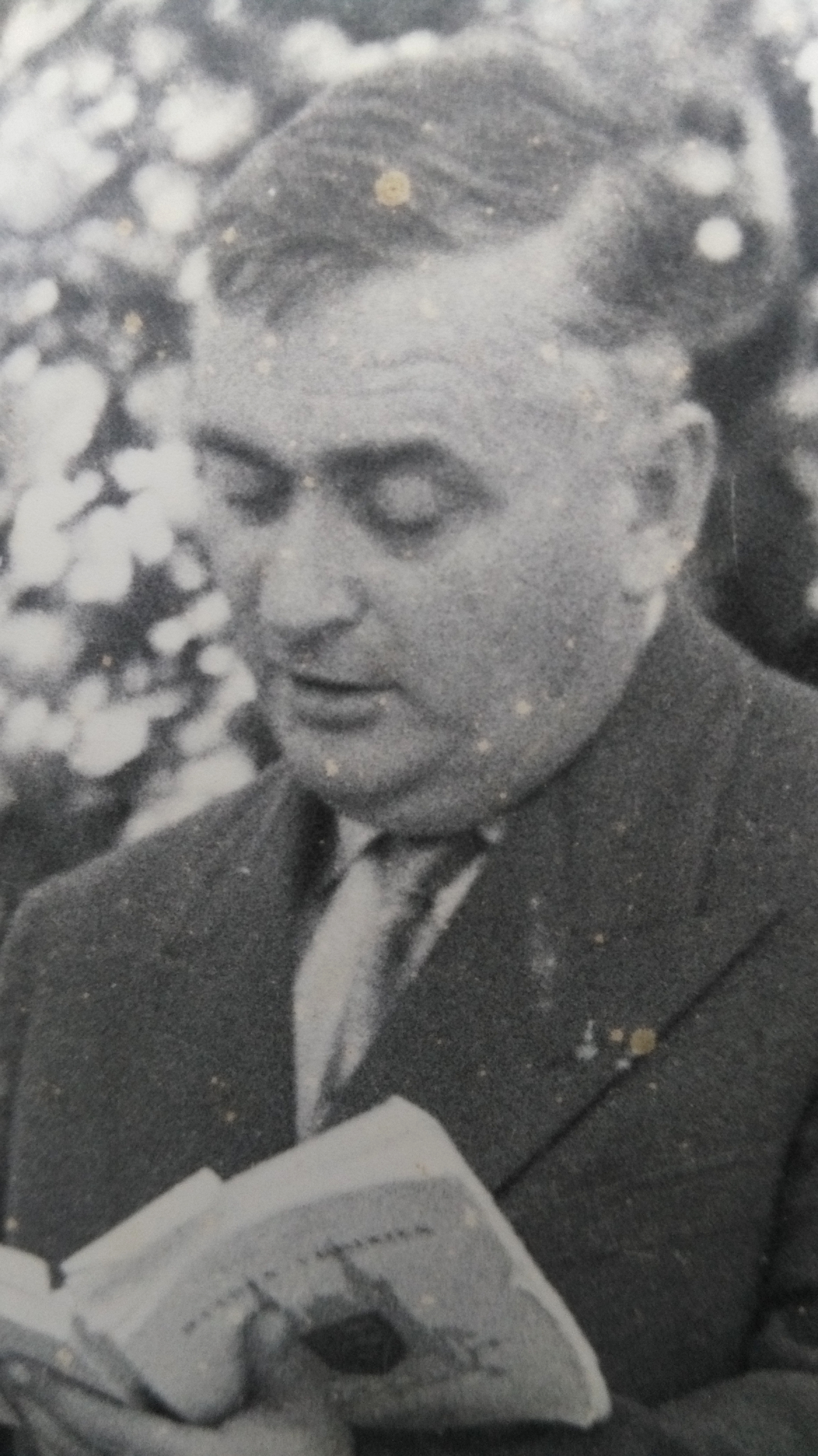
Fernand Léon Auguste Lechanteur

Fernand Léon Auguste Lechanteur (known as Gires-Ganne; 20 June 1910 Agon-Coutainville – 7 May 1971 Caen) was a French poet, ethnologist and linguist from Normandy.
