= Côtis-Capel =

Norman-language poet and priest (1915–1986)

- Born: Albert Auguste Lohier; 22 January 1915; Urville-Hague (now Urville-Nacqueville), Manche, France
- Died: 30 October 1986 (aged 71); Cherbourg, France
- Resting place: Urville-Nacqueville
- Occupations: Poet, Roman Catholic priest, fisherman
- Writing career
- Language: Norman (Cotentinais)
- Notable work: Rocâles (1951); À Gravage (1965); Les Côtis (1985)
- Literary movement: Norman literary revival

Côtis-Capel (22 January 1915 – 30 October 1986) was the pen name of Albert Lohier, a Roman Catholic priest, fisherman and poet who wrote in the Norman language of the Cotentin. He is widely regarded as the foremost 20th-century poet in Norman, and his work is studied by students of dialectology at the University of Caen.

Born into a family of fishermen and smallholders in La Hague, Lohier was ordained in 1942 and, from 1950, became one of the first worker-priests to work as a deep-sea trawler fisherman out of Cherbourg. He wrote exclusively in the Haguais dialect of Cotentinais, drawing on the land and sea of La Hague, its fishermen and peasants, faith and hardship. His symbol was the mâove (seagull), which recurs across his verse.

== Life ==
=== Early life ===
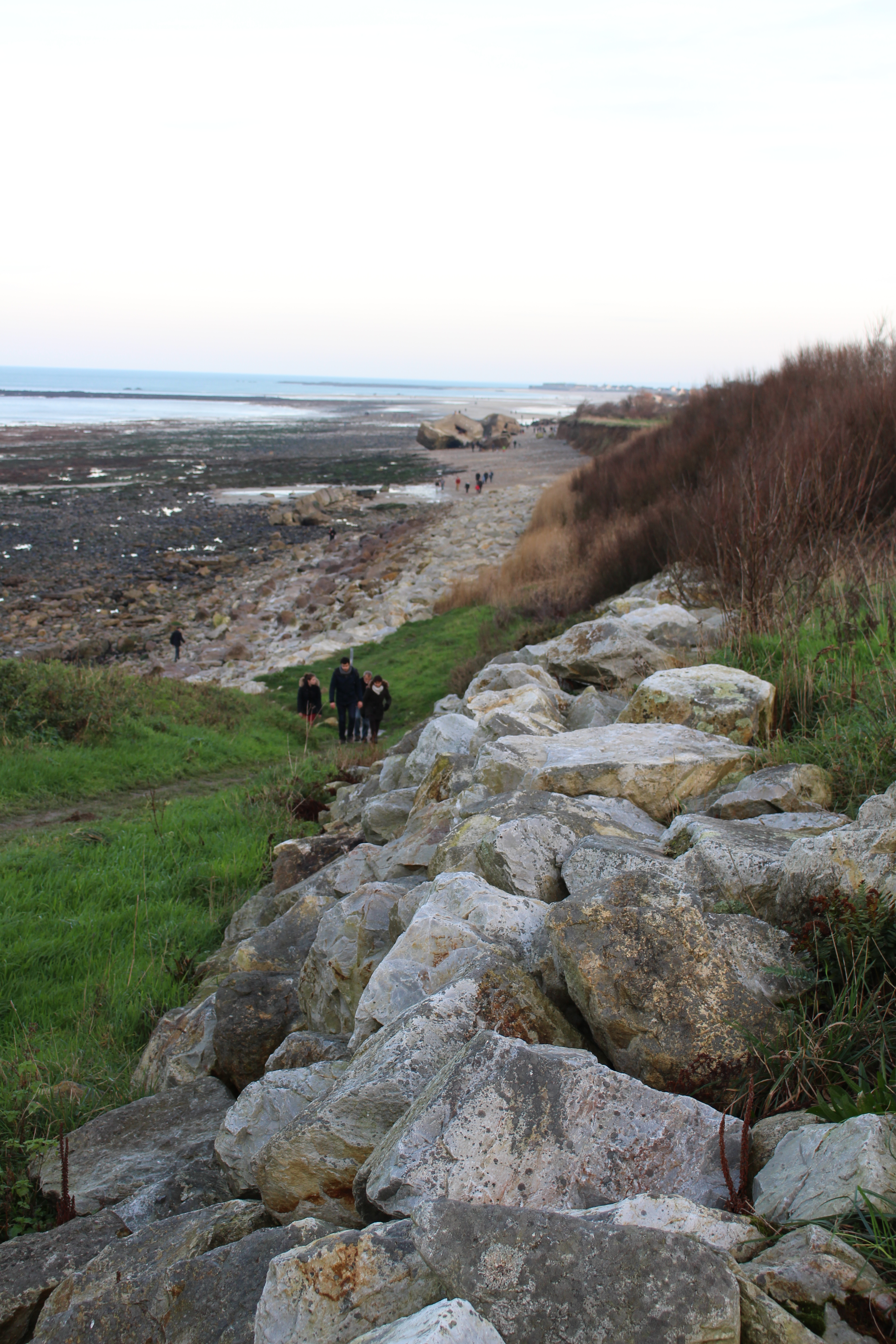
The coast at Landemer, in Urville-Nacqueville, where Côtis-Capel was born and is buried.

Albert Auguste Lohier was born on 22 January 1915 at the hamlet of Capel, in the former commune of Urville-Hague (which merged with Nacqueville in 1965 to form Urville-Nacqueville). He was the third of five children of Hyacinthe Lohier, a fisherman who also worked a smallholding, and his wife Marie (née Lejuez); the household was large, poor and devoutly Catholic. His pen name combines the Norman word côtis, a slope descending toward the sea, with the name of his native hamlet: the family bore the local by-name "Lohyis-Côtis", so that Albert was "eun petit Côtis du hammé Capel".

After the village school he entered the Institut Saint-Paul in Cherbourg on a bursary, did military service in the French Navy, and, after mobilisation in 1939, entered the seminary at Coutances.

=== Priest and wartime chaplain ===
Lohier was ordained priest on 29 June 1942 and appointed curate of the parish of Notre-Dame-du-Roule at Cherbourg. During the German occupation he organised support for young men conscripted under the Service du travail obligatoire and the Organisation Todt work on the Atlantic Wall, and in 1943 became chaplain to the "Jeunes requis chrétiens"; after the Liberation he served as chaplain to the Jeunesse ouvrière chrétienne and to Catholic agricultural youth movements in the Cherbourg sector.

=== Worker-priest and fisherman ===
In 1950 Lohier realised a long-held wish to become a worker-priest, embarking as a deckhand on Cherbourg trawlers within the Mission de la Mer; he is often described as the first priest to work as a deep-sea fisherman. When the Holy See ended the worker-priest experiment around 1960 he "put his sack ashore" but continued to serve fishing communities, notably by founding and running for some twenty years the fishermen's supply cooperative Socopêche and a relief fund for the widows of those lost at sea.

=== Politics and death ===
Lohier joined the Socialist Party in 1971, was active in Amnesty International, and was a determined opponent of the La Hague nuclear reprocessing plant. He died of cancer at Cherbourg on 30 October 1986 and is buried at Urville-Nacqueville.

== Literary work ==
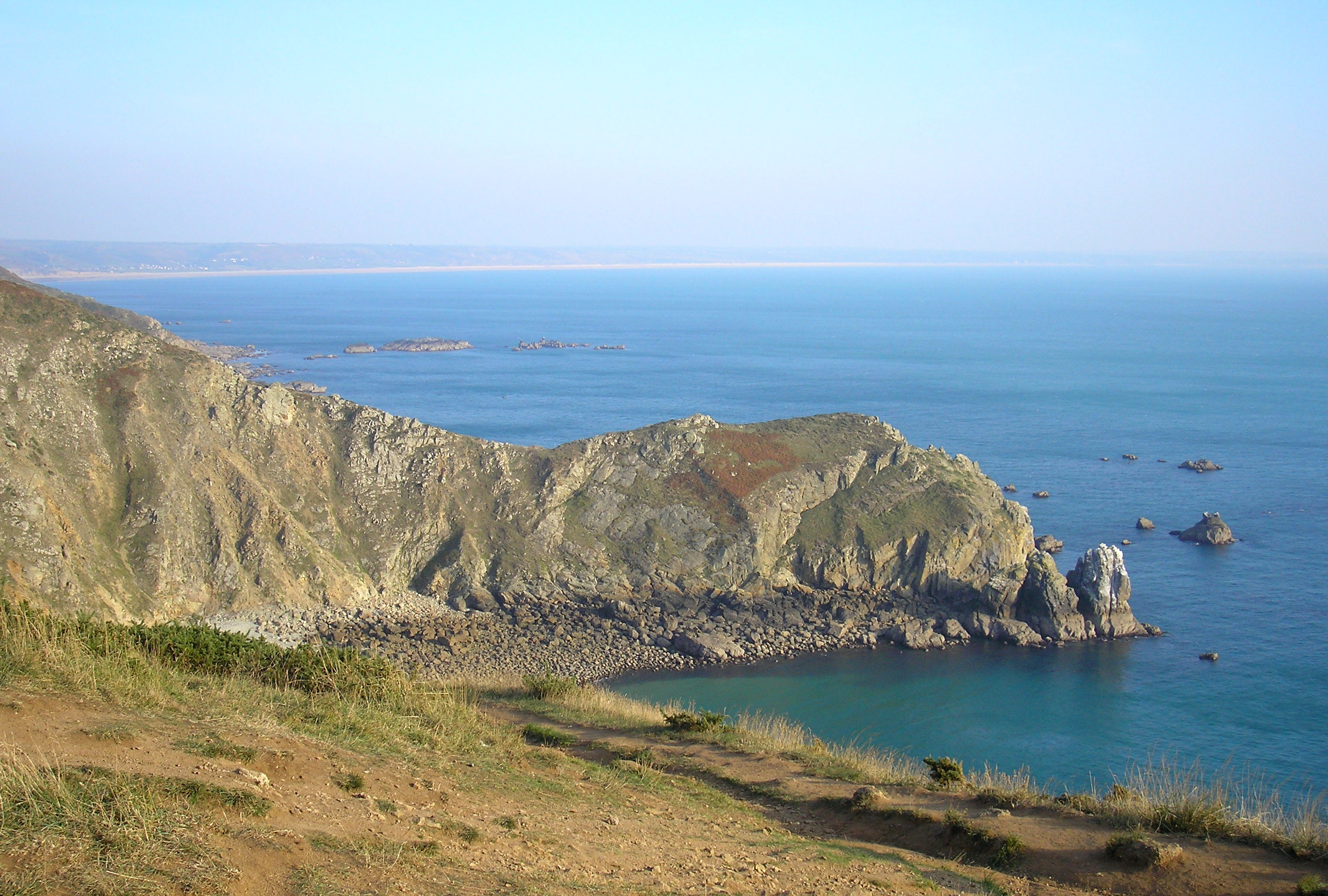
The cliffs of the Nez de Jobourg in La Hague. The coast and sea of La Hague are the recurring subject of Côtis-Capel's poetry.

Lohier began writing in the Haguais dialect in the 1930s. He belongs to the modern revival of the Norman language descended from the Bouais-Jan movement of Louis Beuve, whom he acknowledged as an influence. In 1968 he was a founder member of the society Parlers et traditions populaires de Normandie, whose review became Le Viquet, and in 1972 he helped found the Université populaire normande du Cotentin.

Critics rank him at the head of Cotentin poetry in Norman; Wikimanche notes that he is "considered by many the greatest contemporary poet in Norman". The dialectologist André Dupont wrote that Lohier soon abandoned the epic for the lyric, and then for intimism and meditation, so that "with him, poetry in the vernacular attains the universal". His themes are the land and sea of La Hague, its fishermen and peasants, faith, poverty and the human condition; his early, epic and regional manner gave way to a spare, meditative lyricism.

=== Works ===
- Rocâles (poems, mimeographed, Cherbourg, 1951), his first collection, which won the Cotentin literary prize (Prix littéraire du Cotentin) in 1964.
- À Gravage (poems, OCEP, Coutances, 1965; reissued 2005), issued with recordings of the poems read by the author.
- Raz-Bannes (poems, OCEP, Coutances, 1970), with a preface by Fernand Lechanteur and an accompanying record.
- Graund Câté (poems, OCEP, Coutances, 1980).
- Les Côtis (poems, Isoète, Cherbourg, 1985), his last collection, partly autobiographical.
- Ganache lé vuus péqueus (novella, Isoète, Cherbourg, 1987), his only prose work, published posthumously.

== Music and legacy ==
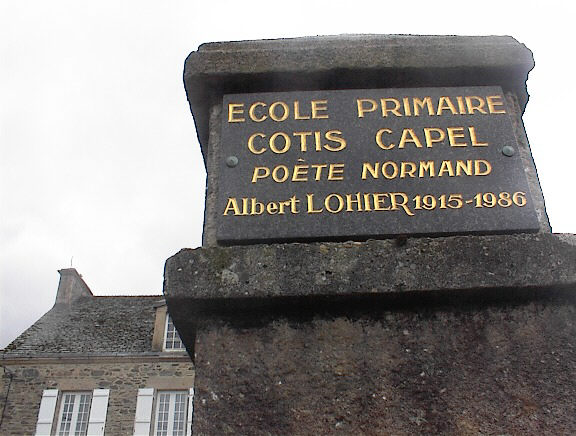
A primary school at Beaumont-Hague is named after Côtis-Capel.

The Cotentin group Magène has set 25 of Côtis-Capel's poems to music, beginning with its first record in 1989, and his verse features on all the group's albums. In 2010 the singer Yannick Bonnissent devoted a whole album, Eune teurque, to his poems. A primary school at Beaumont-Hague and streets at Beaumont-Hague and Cherbourg bear his name.
