= Coat of arms of Normandy =

Regional flag and the heraldic visual design symbolising Normandy

- Shield: Gules, two lions passant guardant or

The coat of arms of Normandy is a red shield with two golden lions passant guardant. Its usage was established by the 13th century, in reference to the coats of arms of the former dukes.

It has been suggested that Henry II, Duke of Normandy since 1151, might have used a coat of arms featuring two lions passant guardant. The main argument in favour of this theory is the fact that a number of his associates used this device. Though it's possible that Henry II had two lions on his shield, it remains unclear whether he used one specific coat of arms and what exactly might have been depicted on it.

A popular legend suggests that the coat of arms of England featuring three lions was created following the marriage of Henry II to Eleanor of Aquitaine, when a single lion representing Aquitaine was added to the two lions of Normandy. However, this coat of arms was actually adopted during the reign of Richard the Lionheart, and there is no evidence that such symbols were associated with these regions during that period.

Later, this design had been attributed to the members of the House of Normandy, who are not known to have used any hereditary devices.

The flag of Normandy, widely used throughout the territory, follows the design of this coat of arms.

== Channel Islands ==
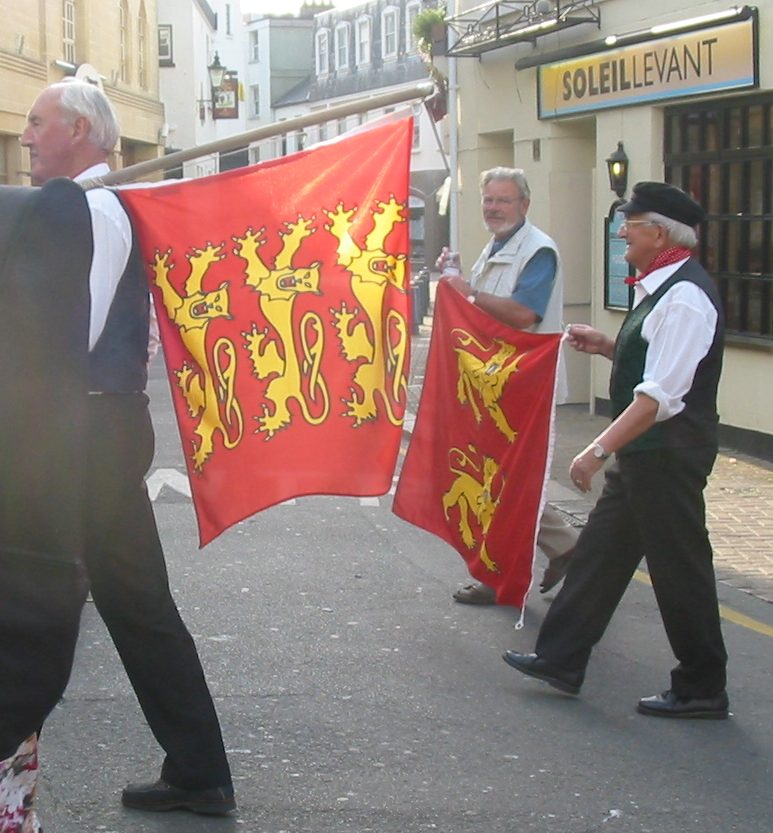
Two-leopard and three-leopard flags at a Norman language festival in Jersey.

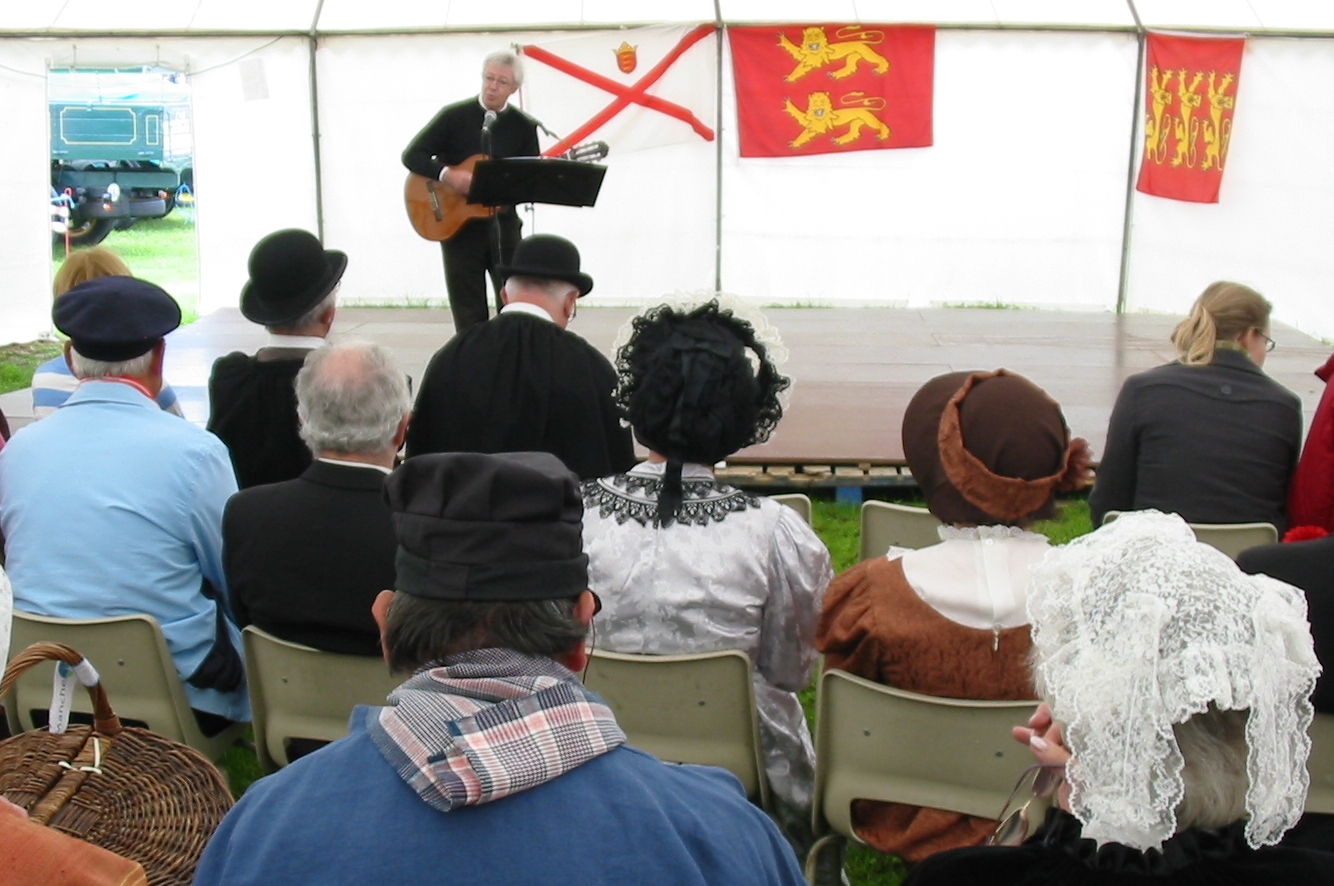
Two-leopard and three-leopard flags at a concert of Norman music.

"Two-leopard" flag of the island of Sark

== Ireland ==
Norman symbols can also be seen in Ireland, through the influence of Anglo-Norman noble families who settled in Ireland in the 12th and 13th centuries, following the Anglo-Norman invasion of Ireland.

Coat of arms of County Carlow

Coat of arms of Portlaoise featuring two lions passant and two fleur-de-lis

== Saint Pierre and Miquelon ==
The coat of arms and flag of Normandy are present in the coat of arms and the unofficial flag of Saint Pierre and Miquelon, an overseas territory of France in North America. They symbolize the Norman heritage of the islands.

Flag of Miquelon-Langlade

Flag of Saint-Pierre and Miquelon

Coat of arms of Saint-Pierre and Miquelon

== See also ==
- Angevin coat of arms
- List of coats of arms of the House of Plantagenet
