= List of Norman-language writers =

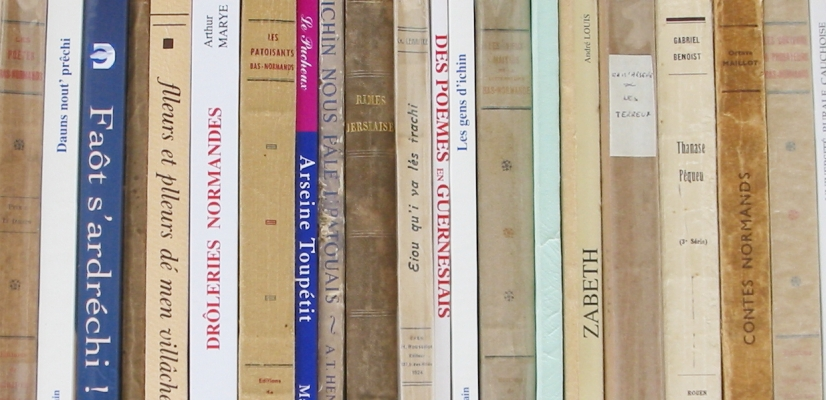
A shelf laden with Norman language literature

This is a list of Norman-language writers and their published works of more recent times (for Channel Island authors, see Jèrriais literature and Dgèrnésiais). Literature in Norman ranges from early Anglo-Norman literature through the 19th-century Norman literary renaissance to modern writers. Authors are sorted by date of birth.

Jean Dorey (1831–1872), from Jersey
Arnould-Désiré Galopin (9 February 1863 – 9 December 1934, from Marbeuf)
Best known as a prolific author in French of popular fiction: adventure stories, historical novels, travel writing and detective fiction, Galopin also wrote the article Le Patois normand published in Le livre du Millénaire de la Normandie, 911–1911 (Paris 1911) and is known to be responsible for the authorship of a small number of poems in the La Hague dialect of Norman.
Charles Lepeley (1889–1970, from Barfleur)
A parish priest in the Val de Saire, between 1928 and 1938, the Abbé Charles Lepeley wrote about a hundred humorous tales, often with a moral point behind them, for the parish magazine L'Hirondelle.
Gabriel Benoist
Cauchois author of Thanase Pequeu stories of which three volumes were published in the 1930s
Alfred Mouchel (1905–1989, from the Val de Saire)
Described a "peasant-poet", he contributed poems and short stories for almost 40 years to the newspaper La Presse de la Manche, as well as compiling a Norman glossary (1944).
Gires Ganne (Fernand Lechanteur 1910–1971)
Author of La Normandie traditionnelle, a collection of articles on language and traditions, his poetry (Es Set vents du Cotentin, 1972) only became widely known after his death. He worked to unify the orthography of the Norman language, proposing reforms. In 1968, he founded an association Parlers et Traditions Populaires de Normandie. A Viking-boat-shaped stone monument to his memory was erected after his death near the seashore of his native Agon.
Côtis-Capel (Albert Lohier 1915–1986, from Cherbourg)
Priest and fisherman, highly influential poet in La Hague, Rocâles (1951), A Gravage (1965), Raz Bannes (1971), Graund Câté (1980), Les Côtis (1985), Ganache (1987); winner of the Prix littéraire du Cotentin in 1964

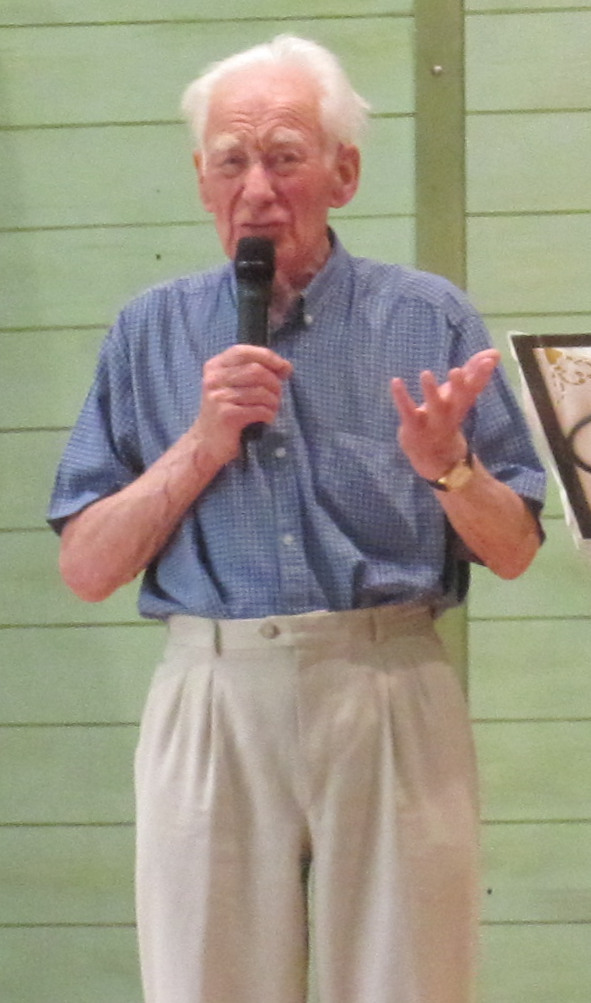
Lucien Malot

Lucien Malot (1921 - 2012)
Born in Bolbec. Taking up literature on his retirement, he produced texts in Cauchois for the newspaper Le Courrier Cauchois. A collection of stories Eul taiseu de Boulbé was published in 2008.
