= Augeron =

Norman dialect of the Pays d'Auge

- Region: Pays d'Auge
- Native speakers: (undated figure of c. 100)
- Language family: Indo-European: Italic; Latino-Faliscan; Latinic; Romance; Italo-Western; Western; Gallo-Iberian?; Gallo-Romance; Gallo-Rhaetian?; Arpitan–Oïl; Oïl; Frankish zone; Northern Norman; Augeron
- Early forms: Old Latin: Vulgar Latin; Proto-Romance; Old Gallo-Romance; Old French; Old Norman

Language codes
- ISO 639-3: –
- Glottolog: None

Augeron (French pronunciation: [oʒʁɔ̃]) is the Norman dialect of the Pays d'Auge. It is highly endangered. This dialect includes both coastal and inland areas.

== Phonology ==
Augeron can be characterised by means of its position within the isoglosses that traverse the Norman-speaking territory. Situated near the division between Lower and Upper Normandy, it can be described as transitional, displaying as it does features typical of western and eastern dialects.

Augeron lies north of the Joret line and therefore shares unpalatalised /ka/ (example: cat = cat) and palatalised /kj/ (example: chinq = five) with the northern dialects from the insular varieties and Cotentinais in the west to Cauchois in the east.

It lies west of the isogloss /ji/ - /je/ (example: muchi = conceal). It is at the easternmost boundary of the Norman dialects displaying this feature.

By contrast, it lies east of the isogloss /l/ - /j/ (example: plache = place). It is near the westernmost boundary of the Norman dialects displaying this feature.

Along with other northern dialects it displays a strongly aspirated (sometimes guttural) realisation of /h/.

== Literature ==
Compared to the insular varieties, Cotentinais and Cauchois, there has not been a long and well-documented literary tradition in Augeron.

Gaston Lerévérend (1885–1962), born in Saint-Paul-de-Courtonne, wrote in Augeron. Collections of his poetry include L'hus entrebâyei (1919), Mei-j'vo-l'dis, and L'hus bâyi (1955).

Roger Dubos (1906–1994) although born in Pont-Audemer and therefore a representative of the dialect at its eastern boundaries, published a Dictionnaire du patois normand (called Le petit Roger) and a collection of stories in French and Norman (Augeron): Nous autres Parisiens... Vôs z-ât' Paysans (1978).

Newspapers and magazines have published literature in Augeron. Le Pays d'Auge published in 1958 a story in the Honfleur dialect: Maître Ursin rev'nant!. Christian Lambert (pen name: Maît'Jules) published over 600 columns in a gallicised Augeron in L'Éveil de Lisieux. Some of these columns were collected in a book Radotages de Maît'Jules in 1984.
