= Flag of Brittany =

French regional flag

Brittany
- Gwenn-ha-du
- Use: Civil and state flag
- Proportion: 2:3
- Design: Nine horizontal stripes alternating black and white with an ermine canton (sable, four bars argent, a canton ermine)
- Designed by: Morvan Marchal

The flag of Brittany (Breton: banniel Breizh; French: drapeau de la Bretagne), a region in the northwest of France, is called the Gwenn-ha-du ([ɡwɛnaˈdyː]), which means white and black, in Breton (French: blanc et noir). The flag was designed in 1923 by Morvan Marchal. It is also unofficially used in the department of Loire-Atlantique, although this now belongs to the Pays de la Loire and not to the region of Brittany, as the territory of Loire-Atlantique is historically part of the province of Brittany.

== Overview ==
The flag is the official banner of the region of Brittany. It is a symbol of the Breton identity used by Bretons in and outside of Brittany. For years the authorities considered the flag as a separatist symbol, but the attitude has now changed and the flag, no longer having any political connotations, may appear everywhere, even on public buildings, along with the other official flags. It is widely used throughout Brittany and can even be seen on town halls in the region. Because of the absence of legislation concerning regional flags in France the flag is also flown on sailing boats and fishing boats. The design of the ermine spots varies as there is no official description, but although the number is also not specified, in flags produced since the 1970s, the canton virtually always contains exactly 11 spots.

The flag was created in 1923 by Morvan Marchal. He used the flag of the United States as his inspiration, seen as a symbol of freedom.

The nine horizontal stripes represent the traditional dioceses of Brittany into which the duchy was divided historically. The five black stripes represent the French or Gallo speaking dioceses of Dol, Nantes, Rennes, Saint-Malo and Saint-Brieuc; the four white stripes represent the Breton-speaking dioceses of Trégor, Léon, Cornouaille and Vannes. The ermine canton recalls the arms of the Duchy of Brittany.

The flag first came to the notice of a wider public at the Exposition Internationale des Arts Décoratifs et Industriels Modernes in Paris in 1925. It was adopted by various cultural and nationalist groups through the 1920s and 1930s. However its association with nationalist, fascist and separatist groups during the Second World War brought suspicions of collaboration to the flag. A revival of interest in the flag took place in the 1960s. Since then it has mostly lost an association with separatism in the mind of the public and become a widely accepted symbol for all Brittany and Bretons. The older ermine field flag and black cross continue to be used, though rarely, by some individuals and groups.

The blazon of the flag is Sable four bars argent, a canton ermine. Traditionally coats of arms could be displayed as a rectangular banner as well as on a shield.

== Gallery ==
Coat of arms from 1213 onwards (Checky or and azure within a bordure gules, a canton ermine).

Army flag and ensign (14th-16th centuries)
Historically, Bretons had used a black cross on a white ground. Little information is available about this flag before the 14th century.

The Kroaz Du was one of the principal Breton flags during the Middle Ages. It figured in the Combat of the Thirty, as well as the Hundred Years' War, and saw wide use by Breton sailors. It is considered by Breton royalists to be the true flag of Brittany.

Coat of arms from 1316 onwards (semé d'hermine).

Coat of arms of Rennes.

The flag of the Duchy of Brittany.

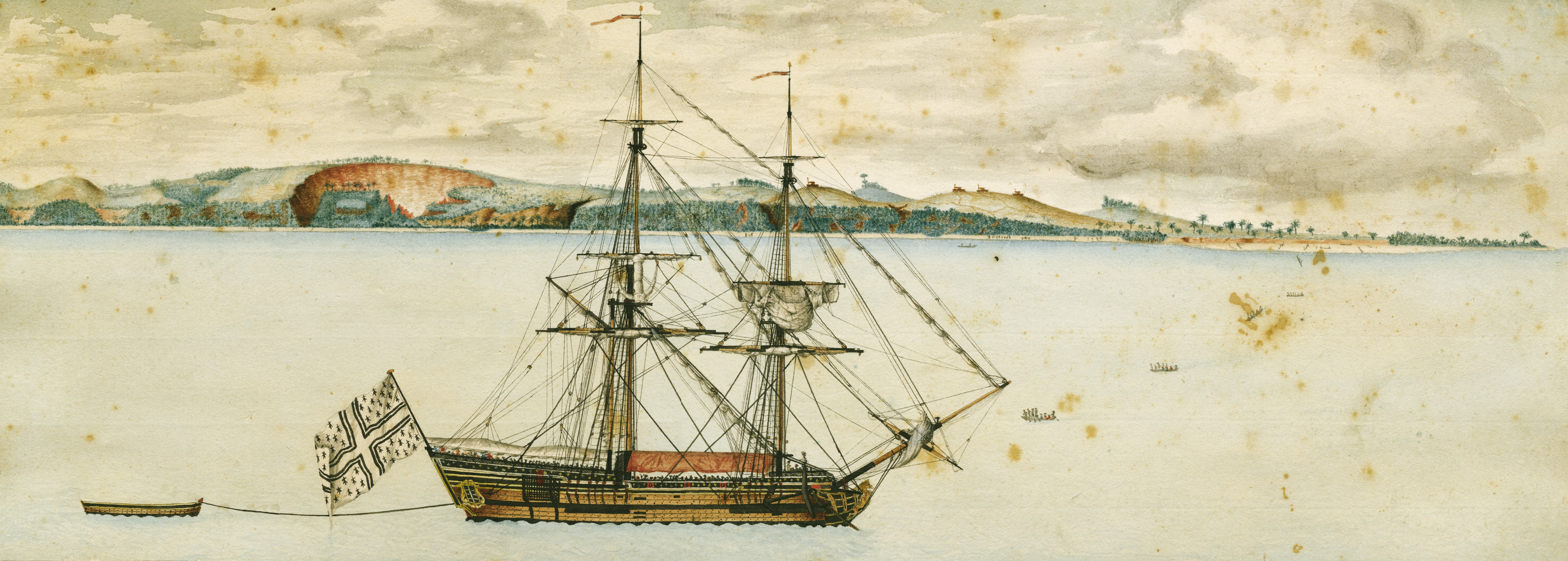
The slave ship Marie Séraphique with the flag of Brittany, 1770.

Flag of the Breton Vexillological Society.

== See also ==
- List of Breton flags
- The coat of arms and the unofficial flag of Saint Pierre and Miquelon include an ermine rectangle symbolizing the Bretons established in the islands.

== Bibliography ==
- Kervella, Divi; Bodlore-Penlaez, Mikael (2008). Guide des drapeaux bretons et celtes (English: Guide to Breton and Celtic flags) (in French). Fouesnant: Yoran Embanner. ISBN 978-2-916579-12-2.
- Rault, Philippe (1998). Les drapeaux bretons de 1188 à nos jours (in French). Spezet: Coop Breizh. ISBN 978-2-84346-034-0.
- Kervella, Divi. (2009). Emblèmes et symboles des Bretons et des Celtes (in French) ([Nouvelle éd.] ed.). Spézet: Coop Breizh. ISBN 978-2-84346-401-0.
- Kernalegenn, Tudi (2005). Drapeaux rouges et Gwenn-ha-du : l'extrême gauche et la Bretagne dans les années 1970 (in French). Rennes: Apogée. ISBN 2-84398-190-5.
- Bodlore-Penlaez, Mikael (2011). Atlas de Bretagne : géographie, culture, histoire, démographie, économie, territoires de vie des bretons = Atlas Breizh : douaroniezh, sevenadur, istor, poblañs, ekonomiezh, tiriadoù buhez ar Vretoned (in French). Speied [i.e. Spézet]: Coop Breizh. ISBN 978-2-84346-496-6.
- Bodlore-Penlaez, Mikael (2015). Gwenn-ha-du : le drapeau breton (in French). Spezet: Coop Breizh. ISBN 978-2-84346-723-3.
- "An Axially Chiral Monomer". Ar Men. 18 February 2010. ISSN 0297-8644.
- Högberg, J.; Orrenius, S.; O'Brien, P. J. (15 November 1975). "Further studies on lipid-peroxide formation in isolated hepatocytes". Histoire Religieuse de la France. ISSN 1255-2364.
- Hamon, Kristian (2004). Le Bezen Perrot : 1944, des nationalistes bretons sous l'uniforme allemand. Fouesnant: Y. Embanner. ISBN 2-9521446-1-3.
- Brannelly, Liam Anton (2015). Proceedings of the Harvard Celtic Colloquium. Volume XXXIV, 2014. Cambridge. ISBN 9780674088566.
