= Angevin coat of arms =

12th–13th century English royal emblem

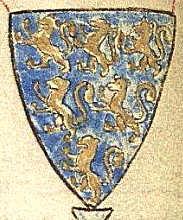
Arms of William Longespée, 3rd Earl of Salisbury, as drawn by Matthew Paris (d. 1259): Azure, six lions rampant or, 3,2,1; similar to the arms of his grandfather, Geoffrey Plantagenet, Count of Anjou

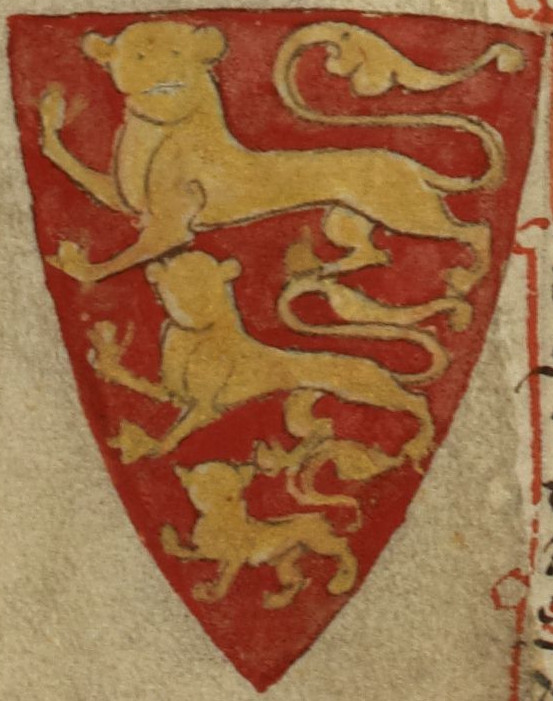
The three lions passants guardants or attributed to William I and his Plantagenet successors (Henry I, Stephen, Henry II, John, Henry III) by Matthew Paris in Historia Anglorum and Chronica Majora in the 1250s

Digitalised coat of arms of Angevin dynasty

The coat of arms of the Angevin dynasty varied over time, but always included a lion.

In 1128, the third historical coat of arms of which there remains a record, is that of Geoffrey Plantagenet, Count of Anjou, depicted as azure, six lions rampant or.

In 1340, Edward III of England adopted gules, three lions passants guardants or as the Royal Arms of England. Based on this, later attributions have associated the Angevin Empire and its territories, especially the Duchy of Normandy and the Duchy of Aquitaine with the blazon gules, a lion passant guardant or. These attributed arms are not to be confused with the historical coat of arms borne by the Capetian House of Anjou created by Louis IX of France for his brother for Charles I of Naples in 1247.

The two lions were attributed retrospectively to Henry II, and they were described as the "flag of Normandy" by Meurgey (1941).

In 2010, Monnaie de Paris issued a 10 Euro coin with this design as representing the region of Aquitaine (Guyenne).

== See also ==
- Angevin kings of England
- Armorial of Plantagenet
- Counts and dukes of Anjou
