= Gabriel Benoist =

French writer

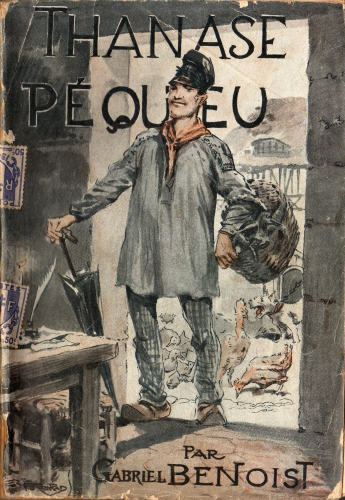
Les Histouères de Thanase Pèqueu, published Rouen in 1933, a collection of stories in Cauchois by Gabriel Benoist.

Gabriel Benoist (11 July 1891 – 27 October 1964) was a French writer in the Cauchois dialect of the Norman language. He is best known for the Thanase Pequeu stories of which three volumes were published in the 1930s.

He was born at Gournay-en-Bray in the Pays de Caux region of the Seine-Maritime department of Normandy.

He was the second eldest of a family of eleven children. He is buried at Yvetot.

== Works ==
- Thanase Péqueu (February 1, 1932)
- Le mariage de Thanase Péqueu
- Les Histouères de Thanase Péqueu, (1932–1937, in Le Journal de Rouen).
