= Amory Adventure Award =

Scouts Canada award

- Country: Canada
- Founder: Canadian Venturer
- Awarded for: Displaying the most initiative in conceiving, planning and executing an outdoor adventure activity
- Website http://www.scouts.ca/dnn/ForYouth/Venturers/AmoryAward/tabid/189/Default.aspx

The Amory Adventure Award is an award in the Canadian Venturer program. Unlike all other awards and badges, for example the Queen's Venturer Award, the Amory Award is only granted to one Venturer company each year. All Venturers who take part in an Amory Award expedition (whether or not they are members of the winning company) receive a participation badge to wear on the uniform. The first-place company's name is recorded on the Amory Adventure Trophy, which the company may keep for nine months. Companies that place first, second, and third each receive a trophy of their own to keep.

The Award is presented annually to the company that displays the most initiative in conceiving, planning and executing an outdoor adventure activity.

== History ==
The award was first presented by the Rt. Hon. Viscount Amory, GCMG, one-time British High Commissioner to Canada. The award itself is in the form of a plaque, presented to the company upon their being selected from among those who submitted an adventure log in that year. The plaque has a reproduction of Jacques Cartier's ship Grande Hermine, and the Canadian space satellite Alouette 1 mounted on it.

Award winners have organized and completed adventures such as bicycle trips, hikes along the West Coast Trail, treks to the Canadian Arctic and canoe journeys.

The Amoury Adventure Award Plaque

== See also ==
- List of highest awards in Scouting
