= Aquitaine =

Aquitaine Aquitània (Occitan) Akitania (Basque)
- Former region
- Flag Coat of arms

- Coordinates: 44.6°N 00.0°E
- Country: France
- Dissolved: 1 January 2016
- Prefecture: Bordeaux
- Departments: 5: Dordogne (24); Gironde (33); Landes (40); Lot-et-Garonne (47); Pyrénées-Atlantiques (64)

Government
  - President: Alain Rousset (PS)

Area
  - Total: 41,308 km^{2} (15,949 sq mi)

Population (2012) INSEE
  - Total: 3,285,970
  - Density: 79.548/km^{2} (206.03/sq mi)

GDP
  - Total: €135.735 billion (2024)
  - Per capita: €37,341 (2024)
- Time zone: UTC+1 (CET)
  - Summer (DST): UTC+2 (CEST)
- ISO 3166 code: FR-B
- NUTS Region: FR61
- Website: www.aquitaine.fr

Aquitaine (UK: /ˌækwɪˈteɪn/, US: /ˈækwɪteɪn/; French: [akitɛn]; Occitan: Aquitània [akiˈtanjɔ]; Basque: Akitania; Poitevin-Saintongeais: Aguiéne), archaic Guyenne or Guienne (Occitan: Guiana), is a historical region of southwestern France and a former administrative region. Since 1 January 2016 it has been part of the administrative region of Nouvelle-Aquitaine. It is situated in the southwest corner of metropolitan France, along the Atlantic Ocean and the Pyrenees mountain range on the border with Spain. It is composed of five departments: Dordogne, Lot-et-Garonne, Pyrénées-Atlantiques, Landes, and Gironde. The Romans established Gallia Aquitania as a province. In the Middle Ages, Aquitaine was a kingdom and a duchy whose boundaries fluctuated considerably. For most of Aquitaine's written history, Bordeaux has been a vital port and administrative centre.

== History ==
=== Ancient history ===
There are traces of human settlement by prehistoric peoples, especially in the Périgord, but the earliest attested inhabitants in the south-west were the Aquitani, who were not considered Celtic people, but more akin to the Iberians (see Gallia Aquitania). Although a number of different languages and dialects were in use in the area during ancient times, it is most likely that the prevailing language of Aquitaine during the late pre-historic to Roman period was an early form of the Basque language. This has been demonstrated by various Aquitanian names and words that were recorded by the Romans, and which are currently easily readable as Basque. Whether this Aquitanian language (Proto-Basque) was a remnant of a Vasconic language group that once extended much farther, or it was generally limited to the Aquitaine/Basque region, is not known. One reason the language of Aquitaine is important is that Basque is the last surviving non-Indo-European language in western Europe and it has had some effect on the languages around it, including Spanish and, to a lesser extent, French.

The original Aquitania (named after the inhabitants) at the time of Caesar's conquest of Gaul included the area bounded by the river Garonne, the Pyrenees and the Atlantic Ocean. The name may stem from Latin 'aqua', maybe derived from the town "Aquae Augustae", "Aquae Tarbellicae" or just "Aquis" (Dax, Akize in modern Basque) or as a more general geographical feature.

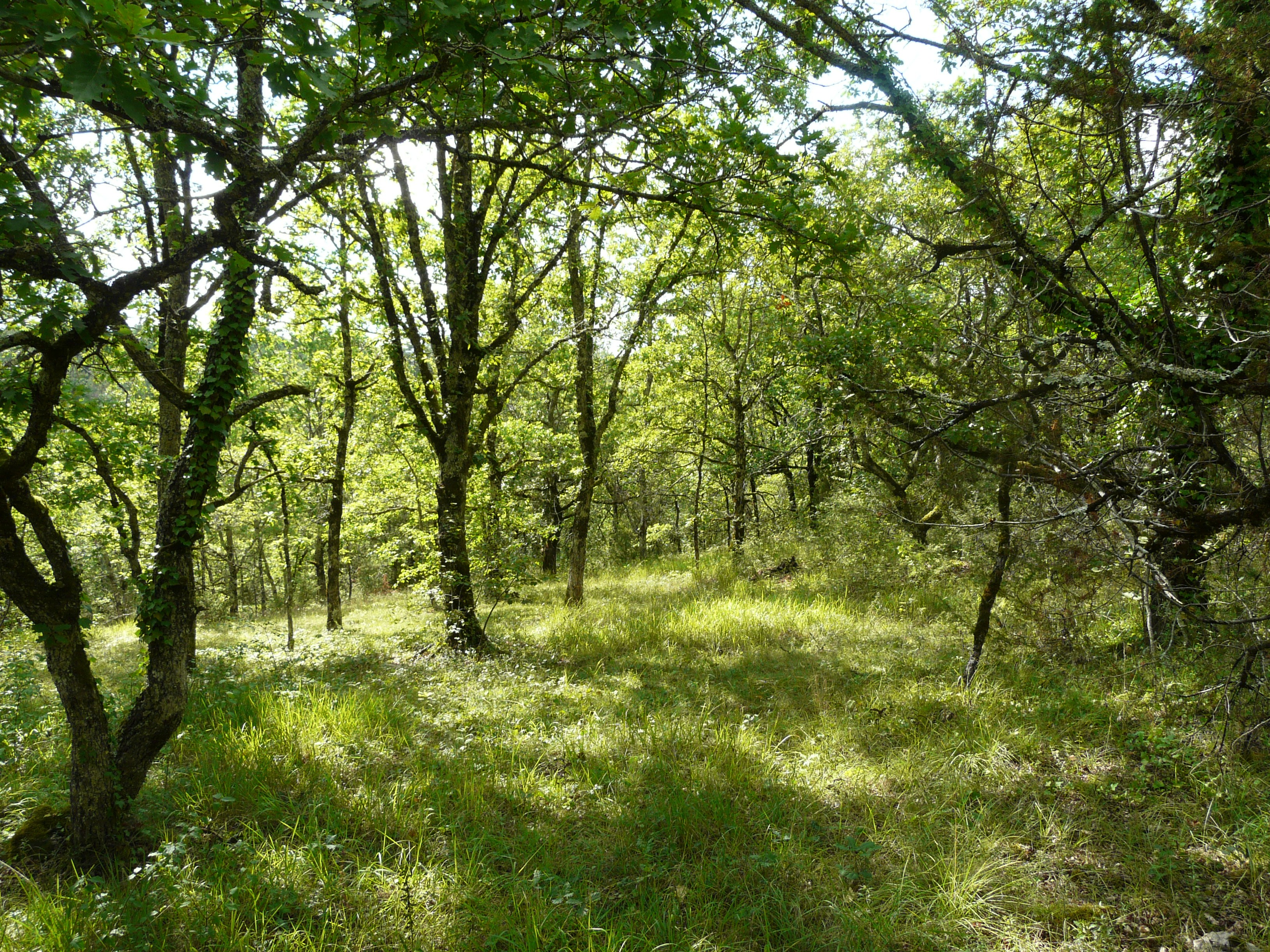
Landscape in Dordogne, Aquitaine

Under Augustus' Roman rule, from 27 BCE the province of Aquitania was further stretched to the north to the river Loire, thus including proper Gaul tribes along with old Aquitani south of the Garonne (cf. Novempopulania and Gascony) within the same region.

In 392, the Roman imperial provinces were restructured as Aquitania Prima (north-east), Aquitania Secunda (centre) and Aquitania Tertia, better known as Novempopulania in the south-west.

=== Early Middle Ages ===
Accounts of Aquitania during the Early Middle Ages are imprecise, but there was much unrest. The Visigoths were called into Gaul as foederati, legalizing their status within the Empire. Eventually they established themselves as the de facto rulers in south-west Gaul as central Roman rule collapsed. Visigoths established their capital in Toulouse, but their tenure on Aquitaine was feeble. In 507, they were expelled south to Hispania after their defeat in the Battle of Vouillé by the Franks, who became the new rulers in the area to the south of the Loire.

The Roman Aquitania Tertia remained in place as Novempopulania, where a duke was appointed to hold a grip over the Basques (Vascones/Wascones, rendered Gascons in English). These dukes were quite detached from central Frankish overlordship, sometimes governing as independent rulers with strong ties to their kinsmen south of the Pyrenees. As of 660, the foundations for an independent Aquitaine/Vasconia polity were established by the duke Felix of Aquitaine, a magnate (potente(m)) from Toulouse, probably of Gallo-Roman stock. Despite its nominal submission to the Merovingians, the ethnic make-up of the new Aquitanian realm was not Frankish, but Gallo-Roman north of the Garonne and in main towns and Basque, especially south of the Garonne.

Situation in the duchies of Vasconia and Aquitaine in 760 CE

A united Basque-Aquitanian realm reached its heyday under Odo the Great's rule. In 721, the Aquitanian duke fended Umayyad troops (Sarracens) off at Toulouse, but in 732 (or 733, according to Roger Collins), an Umayyad expedition commanded by Abdul Rahman Al Ghafiqi defeated Odo next to Bordeaux, and went on to loot its way up to Poitiers. Odo was required to pledge allegiance to the Frankish Charles Martel in exchange for help against the advancing Arab forces. Basque-Aquitanian self-rule temporarily came to a halt, definitely in 768 after the assassination of Waifer.

In 781, Charlemagne decided to proclaim his son Louis King of Aquitaine within the Carolingian Empire, ruling over a realm comprising the Duchy of Aquitaine and the Duchy of Vasconia. He suppressed various Basque (Gascon) uprisings, even venturing into the lands of Pamplona past the Pyrenees after ravaging Gascony, with a view to imposing his authority also in the Vasconia to south of Pyrenees. According to his biography, he achieved everything he wanted and after staying overnight in Pamplona, on his way back his army was attacked in Roncevaux in 812, but narrowly escaped an engagement at the Pyrenean passes.

Seguin (Sihiminus), count of Bordeaux and Duke of Vasconia, seemed to have attempted a detachment from the Frankish central authority on Charlemagne's death. The new emperor Louis the Pious reacted by removing him from his capacity, which stirred the Basques into rebellion. The king in turn sent his troops to the territory, obtaining their submission in two campaigns and killing the duke, while his family crossed the Pyrenees and continued to foment risings against Frankish power. In 824, the 2nd Battle of Roncevaux took place, in which counts Aeblus and Aznar, Frankish vassals from the Duchy of Vasconia sent by the new King of Aquitaine, Pepin, were captured by the joint forces of Iñigo Arista and the Banu Qasi.

Before Pepin's death, emperor Louis had appointed a new king in 832, his son Charles the Bald, while the Aquitanian lords elected Pepin II as king. This struggle for control of the kingdom led to a constant period of war between Charles, loyal to his father and the Carolingian power, and Pepin II, who relied more on the support of Basque and Aquitanian lords.

=== Ethnic make-up in the Early Middle Ages ===
Despite the early conquest of southern Gaul by the Franks after the Battle of Vouillé in 507, the Frankish element was feeble south of the Loire, where Gothic and Gallo-Roman Law prevailed and a small Frankish settlement took place. However scarce, some Frankish population and nobles settled down in regions like Albigeois, Carcassonne (on the fringes of Septimania), Toulouse, and Provence and Lower Rhone (the last two not in Aquitaine). After the death of the king Dagobert I, the Merovingian tenure south of the Loire became largely nominal, with the actual power being in the hands of autonomous regional leaders and counts. The Franks may have become largely assimilated to the preponderant Gallo-Roman culture by the 8th century, but their names were well in use by the ruling class, like Odo. Still, in the Battle of Toulouse, the Aquitanian duke Odo the Great was said to be leading an army of Aquitanians and Franks.

On the other hand, the Franks did not mix with the Basques, keeping separate paths. In the periods before and after the Muslim thrust, the Basques are often cited in several accounts stirring against Frankish attempts to subdue Aquitaine (stretching up to Toulouse) and Vasconia, pointing to a not preponderant but clearly significant Basque presence in the former too. Recorded evidence points to their deployment across Aquitaine in a military capacity as a mainstay of the Duke's forces. 'Romans' are cited as living in the cities of Aquitaine, as opposed to the Franks (mid 8th century).

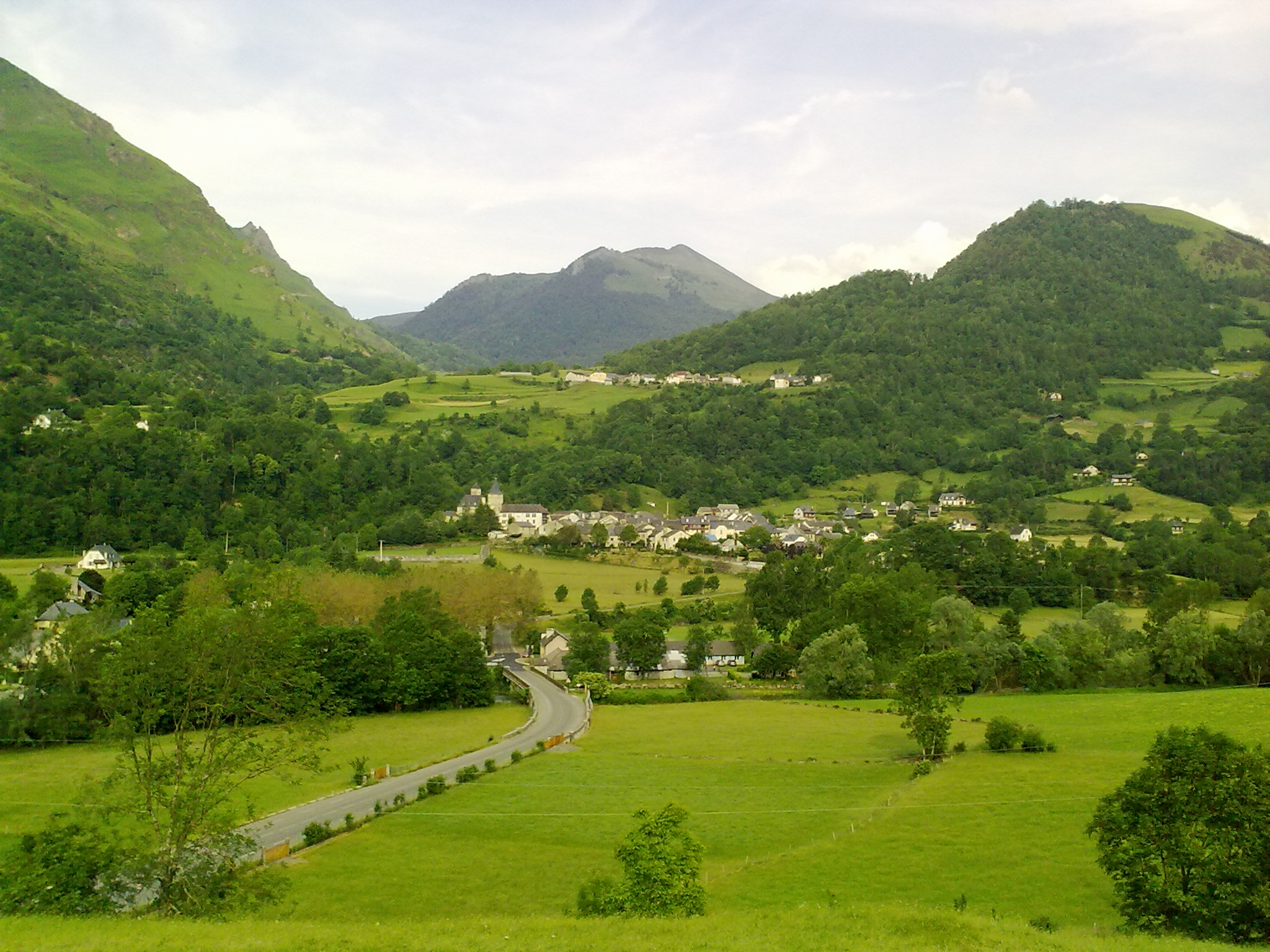
Landscape in Pyrénées-Atlantiques, Aquitaine

=== Aquitaine after the Treaty of Verdun ===
After the 843 Treaty of Verdun, the defeat of Pepin II of Aquitaine and the death of Charles the Bald, the Kingdom of Aquitaine (subsumed in West Francia) ceased to have any relevance and the title of King of Aquitaine took on a nominal value. In 1058, the Duchy of Vasconia (Gascony) and Aquitaine merged under the rule of William VIII, Duke of Aquitaine.

The title "Duke of Aquitaine" was held by the counts of Poitiers from the 10th to the 12th century.

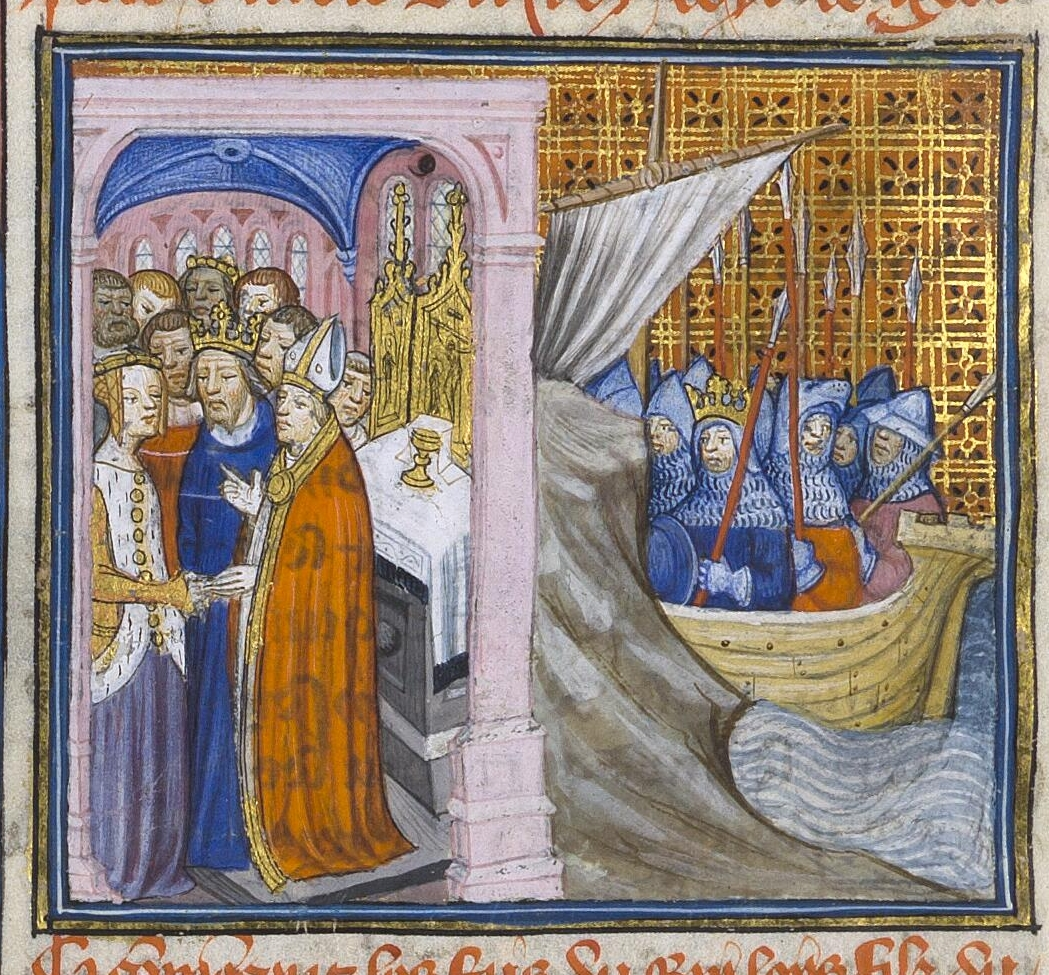
14th-century representation of the wedding of Eleanor of Aquitaine to Louis of France

=== English Aquitaine ===
Aquitaine passed to France in 1137 when the duchess Eleanor of Aquitaine married Louis VII of France, but their marriage was annulled in 1152. When Eleanor's new husband became King Henry II of England in 1154, the area became an English possession, and a cornerstone of the Angevin Empire. Aquitaine remained English until the end of the Hundred Years' War in 1453, when it was annexed by France.

During the three hundred years that the region was ruled by the Kings of England, links between Aquitaine and England strengthened, with large quantities of wine produced in southwestern France being exported to London, Southampton, and other English ports. In fact, so much wine and other produce was being exported to London and sold that by the start of the Hundred Years' War the profits from Aquitaine were the principal source of the English King's income per annum.

=== After the Hundred Years' War ===
The region served as a stronghold for the Protestant Huguenots during the 16th and 17th centuries, who suffered persecution at the hands of the French Catholics. The Huguenots called upon the English crown for assistance against forces led by Cardinal Richelieu.

From the 13th century until the French Revolution, Aquitaine was usually known as Guyenne.

== Demographics ==
Aquitaine consists of 3,150,890 inhabitants, equivalent to 6% of the total French population.

The region of Aquitaine forms the 6th most populated region in France.

== Culture ==
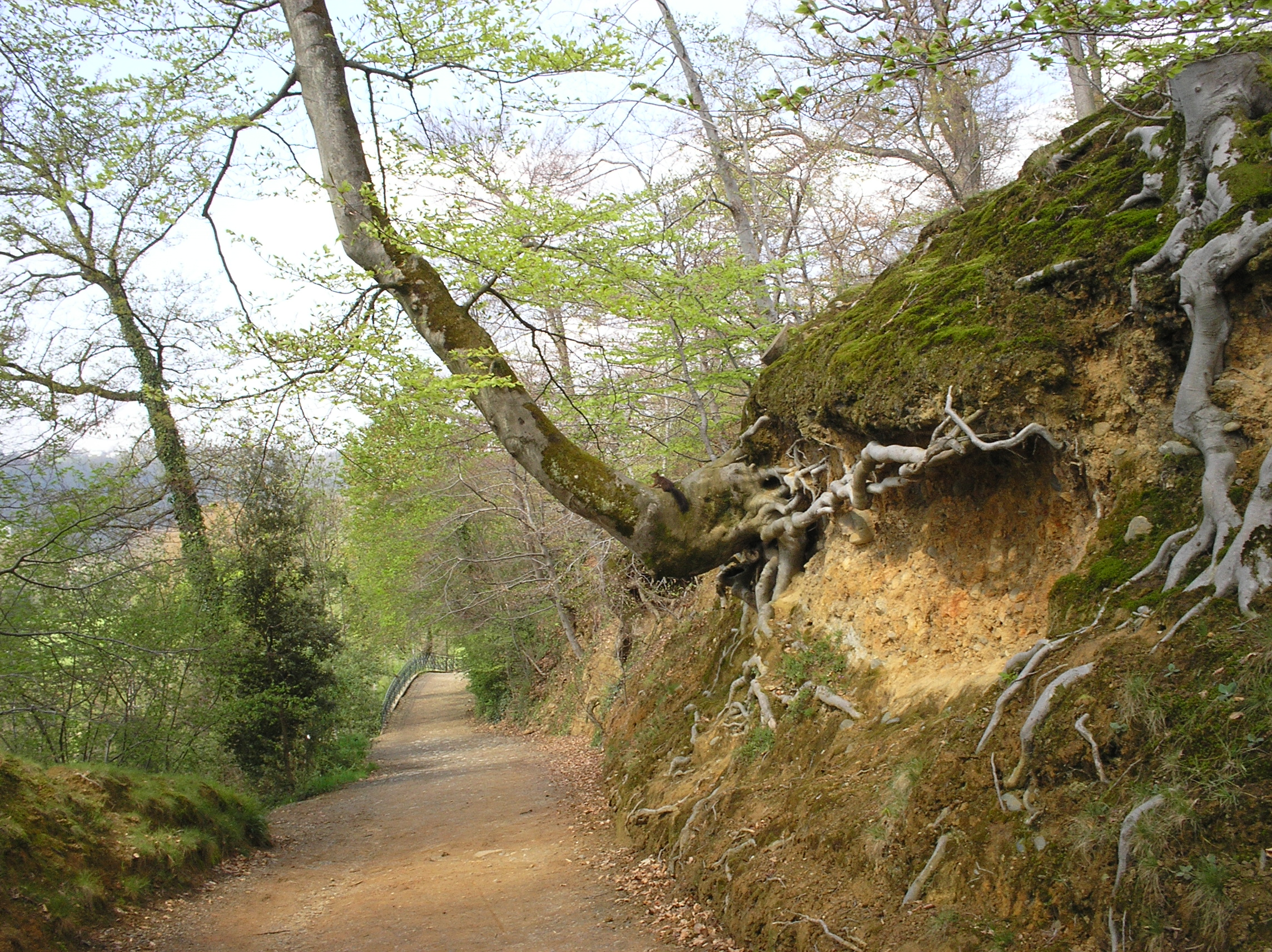
The footpath west from the Château de Pau

=== Language ===
French is the official language of the region. Many residents also have some knowledge of Basque, of a variety of Occitan (Gascon, Limousin, or Languedocien), or of the Poitevin-Saintongeais dialect of French.

In 2005, 78,000 children were learning Occitan as a second language in state schools and 2,000 were enrolled in Occitan-medium private schools.

Basque speakers number about 73,000, concentrated in the far south of the region:

- Labourd: 37% of the population (38,600 bilingual, 24,000 able to read and understand)
- Lower Navarre and Soule: 76% of the population (28,000 bilingual, 7,000 able to read and understand)

== Important cities ==
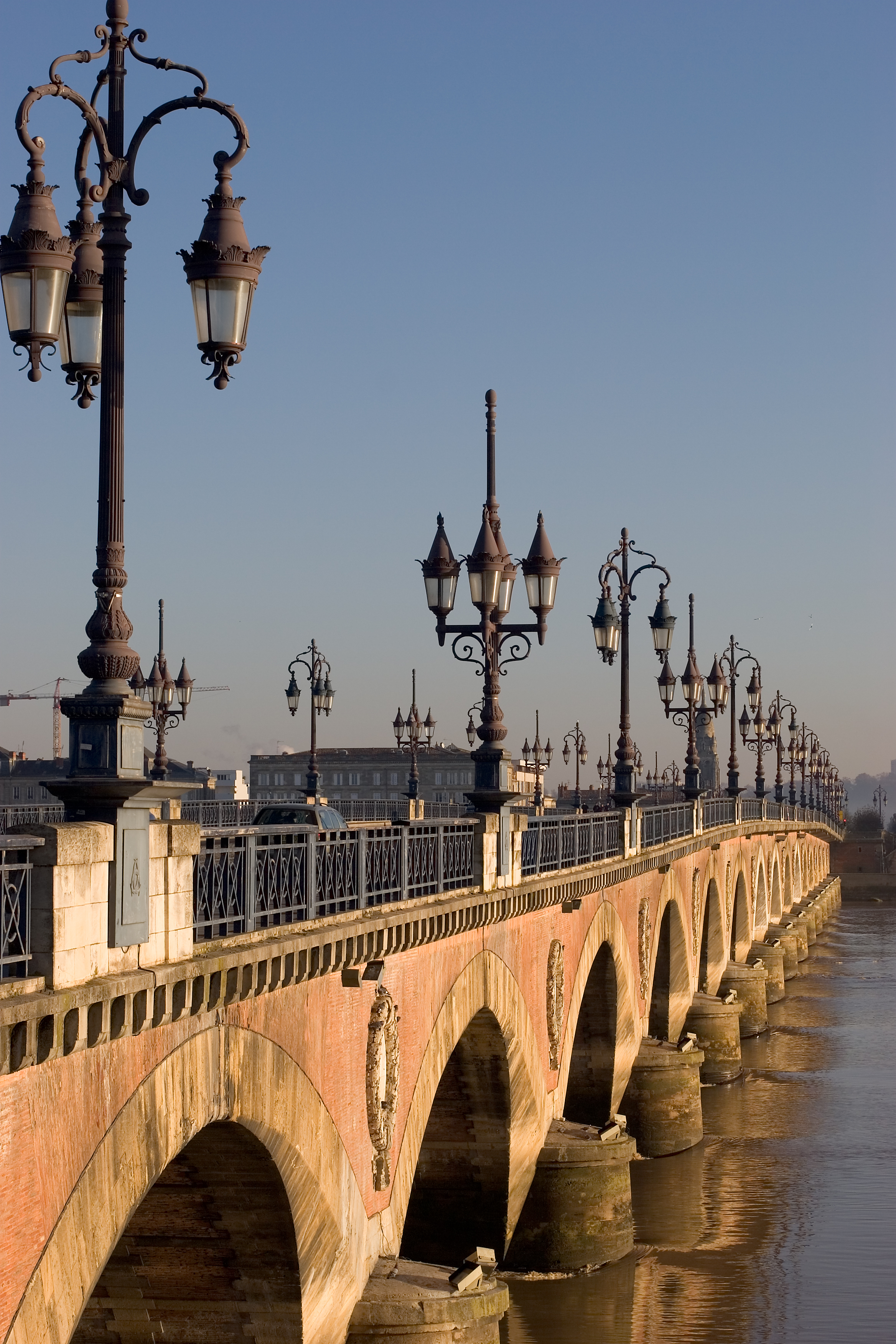
Bordeaux, Pont-de-Pierre

Bordeaux is the largest city in Aquitaine. It is a port city on the Garonne River in the Gironde department. It is the capital of Aquitaine, as well as the prefecture of the Gironde department. Bordeaux is famous for its wine industry. Apart from Bordeaux, there are also other important cities in Aquitaine.

- Bordeaux
- Pau
- Mérignac
- Pessac
- Bayonne
- Périgueux
- Talence
- Anglet
- Agen
- Mont-de-Marsan
- Dax

== Sport ==
The region is home to many successful sports teams. In particular worth mentioning are:

Football

- FC Girondins de Bordeaux, one of France's most successful association football teams.
- Pau FC
- FC Libourne-Saint-Seurin

Rugby union is particularly popular in the region. Clubs include:

- SU Agen
- Aviron Bayonnais
- Biarritz Olympique, runners-up in the 2005–6 Heineken Cup.
- Union Bordeaux-Bègles
- Section Paloise
- Stade Montois
- US Dax

Basketball

- Élan Béarnais Pau-Orthez one of the most successful French basketball clubs

Bull-fighting is also popular in the region.

Major surfing championships regularly take place on Aquitaine's coast.

== See also ==
- Aquitania
- The Aquitanian Age of the Miocene Epoch is named for deposits in the Aquitaine region
- Basque Country
- Basque people
- Bordeaux wine regions
- Gascony
- Duchy of Aquitaine
- Occitania
- Pompogne Solar Park
- Southern Europe
