= Alouette 1 =

First Canadian satellite

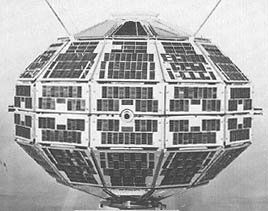
- The Alouette 1 satellite
- Mission type: Ionospheric
- Operator: DRDC
- Harvard designation: 1962 Beta Alpha 1
- COSPAR ID: 1962-049A
- SATCAT no.: 424
- Mission duration: Final: 10 years and 1 day

Spacecraft properties
- Manufacturer: Defence Research Telecommunications Establishment
- Launch mass: 145.6 kilograms (321 lb)

Start of mission
- Launch date: September 29, 1962, 06:05 UTC
- Rocket: Thor DM-21 Agena-B
- Launch site: Vandenberg LC-75-1-1

End of mission
- Deactivated: September 30, 1972

Orbital parameters
- Reference system: Geocentric
- Regime: Low Earth
- Semi-major axis: 7,381 kilometres (4,586 mi)
- Eccentricity: 0.00243
- Perigee altitude: 996 kilometres (619 mi)
- Apogee altitude: 1,032 kilometres (641 mi)
- Inclination: 80.500 degrees
- Period: 105.50 minutes
- Epoch: 29 September 1962 06:05:00 UTC

Alouette 1 is a deactivated Canadian satellite that studied the ionosphere. Launched in 1962, it was Canada's first satellite, and the first satellite constructed by a country other than the Soviet Union or the United States. Canada was the fourth country to operate a satellite, as the British Ariel 1, constructed in the United States by NASA, preceded Alouette 1 by five months. The name "Alouette" came from the French for "skylark" and the French-Canadian folk song of the same name.

A key device on Alouette were the radio antennas consisting of thin strips of beryllium copper bent into a slight U-shape and then rolled up into small disks in a fashion similar to a measuring tape. When triggered, the rotation of the satellite created enough centrifugal force to pull the disk away from the spacecraft body, and the shaping of the metal caused it to unwind into a long spiral. The result was a stiff circular cross-section antenna known as a "STEM", for "storable tubular extendible member".

== Development ==
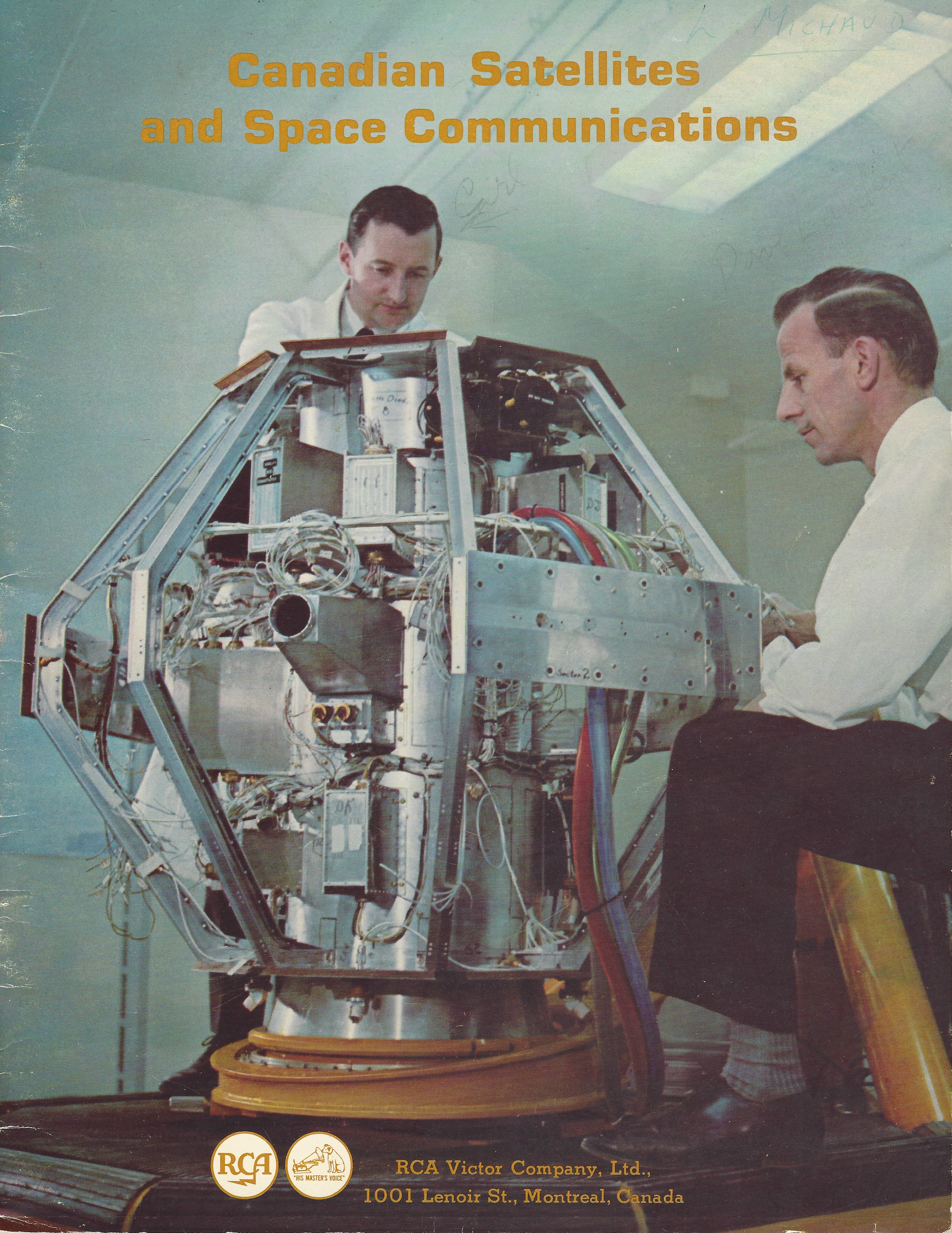
Alouette 1 assembly

Alouette 1 was part of a joint Canada–U.S. scientific program. Its purpose was to investigate the properties of the top of the ionosphere, and the dependence of those properties on geographical location, season, and time of day. Alouette 1 was advanced for its time, and NASA initially doubted whether the available technology would be sufficient. Nevertheless, NASA was eager to collaborate with international partners. NASA was convinced to participate by the prospect of obtaining data on the ionosphere, and Canada had the additional objective of developing its own space research programme. The United Kingdom also aided the mission by providing support at two ground stations, in Singapore and at Winkfield.

=== Experiments ===
Alouette 1 carried four scientific experiments:

- Sweep-Frequency Sounder. This experiment measured the electron density distribution in the ionosphere by measuring the time delay between the emission and return of radio pulses. The sounder was able to emit pulses with frequencies between 1 and 12 megahertz, with a power of 100 W.
- Energetic particle detectors. An arrangement of Geiger counters and scintillators for detecting energetic particles.
- VLF Receiver. An experiment for measuring both artificial and natural VLF signals. It was sensitive to frequencies between 400 and 10,000 Hz.
- Cosmic Radio Noise. Two long radio antennas used for detecting radio noise from the Sun and the Galaxy.

The satellite did not have a tape recorder to store data. It was only possible to obtain data when the satellite was in range of a receiving station.

=== Duplicate construction ===
Two satellites were built for redundancy in case of a malfunction; if the first unit failed, the second could be launched with only a couple of months' delay. It took 3½ years after Alouette's proposal to have it developed and built. The satellites S27-2 (prototype), S27-3 (which became the launched satellite), and S27-4 (which became the backup) were assembled by Defence Research Telecommunications Establishment (DRTE) Electronics Lab in Ottawa, Ontario. The mechanical frame and the deployable STEM antennas were made by Special Products and Applied Research Aerospace (SPAR Aerospace), a former division of de Havilland Canada (DHC) in North York, Ontario, in a building which many years later (until 2012) housed the Canadian Air and Space Museum. The batteries used for Alouette were developed by the Defence Chemical, Biological, and Radiation Laboratory (DCBRL), another branch of DRB, and were partially responsible for the long lifetime of the satellite. The "Storable Tubular Extendable Member" antennas used were the first of DHC's STEM antennas used in space, and at launch were the longest (150 feet tip to tip). Companies such as RCA Victor and Spar Aerospace Limited produced some of their first pieces of space equipment for the Alouette 1 project. Parts used for the construction of Alouette 1 can still be found in the Musée des ondes Emile Berliner in Montreal, Quebec where part of the satellite was worked on.

== Satellite launch and mission progress ==
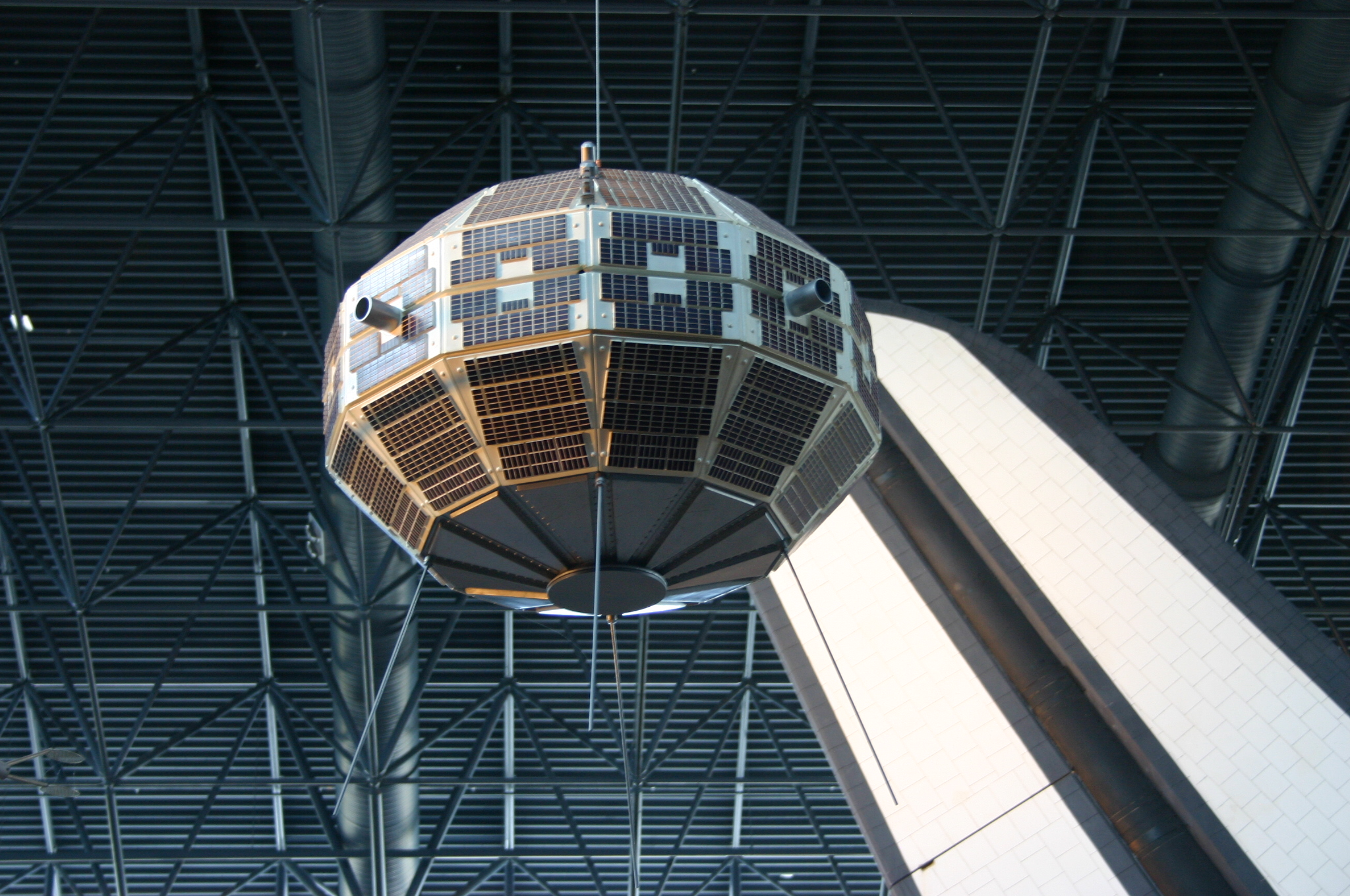
Alouette 1 model

Alouette 1 was launched via Thor-Agena-B two-stage rocket by NASA from the Pacific Missile Range at Vandenberg Air Force Base, California, USA at 06:05 UTC on September 29, 1962, into orbit around Earth. The 145.6 kilograms (321 lb) satellite was placed into an almost circular orbit with an altitude of 987 kilometres (613 mi) to 1,022 kilometres (635 mi) with an inclination of 80.5°. The launch made Canada the third nation, after the USSR and the United States, to design and construct its own satellite. Alouette was used to study the ionosphere, using over 700 different radio frequencies to investigate its properties from above.

The satellite was initially spin-stabilized, rotating 1.4 times per minute. After about 500 days, the rotation had slowed to about 0.6 rpm and the spin-stabilization failed at this point. It was then possible to determine the satellite's orientation only by readings from a magnetometer and from temperature sensors on the upper and lower heat shields. The orientation determinations obtained this way were only accurate to within 10 degrees. It is likely that gravitational gradients had caused the longest antenna to point towards the Earth.

A 2010 technical report by the US Defense Threat Reduction Agency titled "Collateral Damage to Satellites from an EMP Attack" lists Alouette 1 among the satellites damaged by residual radiation from the July 9, 1962, Starfish Prime high-altitude nuclear test conducted by the United States. Another article, titled "Anthropogenic Space Weather", indicates Alouette 1 sustained no significant adverse effects from the Starfish radiation, most likely due to a very conservative power supply design that allowed for a 40% degradation of solar cell performance.

Alouette's mission lasted for 10 years before the satellite was deliberately switched off on September 30, 1972. The satellite remains in orbit; in 1966 it was estimated that Alouette 1 would remain in orbit for 1,000 years.

== Post mission ==
After Alouette 1 was launched, the upper stage of the rocket used to launch the satellite became a derelict object that would continue to orbit Earth for many years. As of 2024, the upper stage and the satellite itself remain in orbit.

The Alouette 1 was named an IEEE Milestone in 1993. It is featured on the Amory Adventure Award.

Alouette 1's backup was later launched, with some modification, as Alouette 2 in 1965 to "replace" the older Alouette 1.

== See also ==
- Timeline of artificial satellites and space probes
- Prince Albert Radar Laboratory (used as the initial ground station)
