= King's Venturer Award =

Awards

- Country: Canada
- Founder: Canadian Venturer
- Awarded for: Venturer Scouts who have acquired competence and skills that will be of considerable use to themselves, their company, and their community.

The King's Venturer Award (formerly Queen's Venturer Award) is the highest Scouting proficiency award for Venturer Scouts in Scouts Canada that can be regularly awarded, as the Amory Adventure Award is only awarded to one venturer company each year. When the Scout program was divided into Scouts and Venturers, during the reign of Queen Elizabeth II, the highest award, the Queen's Scout Award, was renamed to reflect its application to the Venturer section. The award is presented to venturers who have acquired competence and skills that will be of considerable use to themselves, their company, and their community. These venturers will have also been recognized by the company, the advisor, and Scouts Canada as being worthy of receiving the award.

The King's Venturer Award signifies that a venturer has, in the opinion of those who know the venturer, both the character and ability to be of significant help to others. It consists of a cloth emblem and a parchment certificate, signed by the governor general of Canada, in the official capacity as chief scout of Canada.

== Requirements (pre-Canadian Path) ==
A candidate for the King's Venturer Award must meet the following requirements:

1. Hold the Venturer Award or demonstrate equivalent skills and knowledge.
2. Hold a current St. John Ambulance or Canadian Red Cross Society Standard level First Aid Certificate.
3. Hold the World Conservation Award.
4. Be currently certified in a Service Skill.
5. Complete a minimum of fifty hours service of your choice for which you receive no monetary reward.
6. Act as an activity leader or Scouter-in-training at no less than eight meetings or activities. You may also substitute twelve hours service at a beaver, cub or scout camp actively working with youth.
7. Demonstrate leadership in a peer environment by being actively involved for a period of time with a decision-making body.
8. Demonstrate your commitment to the Venturer Promise by:

a. Earning the Blue Stage religion in life award in your church,
or
b. Successfully completing a recognized course in world religions
or
c. Other active demonstrations of your continuing spirituality to the satisfaction of your company and advisor.

== See also ==
- List of highest awards in Scouting
