= Flag of Saint Pierre and Miquelon =

Saint Pierre and Miquelon
- Use: Unofficial flag
- Proportion: 2:3
- Adopted: c. 1980s
- Design: A blue field charged with a yellow silhouette of the Grande Hermine; on the hoist, the flag of the Basque Country, the ermine canton of the flag of Brittany, and the flag of Normandy arranged vertically
- Designed by: André Paturel

Saint Pierre and Miquelon, an overseas collectivity of France, does not have its own official flag, but an unofficial flag based on the islands' official coat of arms is commonly flown by locals. French law neither authorises nor prohibits the use of the unofficial flag by local officials, and it has appeared on official documents and in front of government buildings alongside the French national flag. The unofficial flag has also been flown by civilian vessels as a civil ensign.

The design of the unofficial flag features a sailing ship (Grande Hermine) and a hoist with the flags of the Basque Country, Brittany, and Normandy – the three regions from which many of Saint Pierre and Miquelon's inhabitants originate. A local resident, André Paturel, created the flag in the 1980s with the islands' coat of arms as his basis. The coat of arms itself was inspired by a 1947 revenue stamp and designed in the 1960s by another local, Léon Joner.

== History ==
The first permanent settlers from France came to the islands in the late 17th century. Following the establishment of the French First Republic during the French Revolution, the French tricolour was raised in Saint Pierre and Miquelon, as was recorded by French diplomat and historian François-René de Chateaubriand in 1793:

Du jardin, nous montions aux mornes, et nous nous arrêtions au pied du mât de pavillon de la vigie. Le nouveau drapeau français flottait sur notre tete; comme les femmes de Virgile, nous regardions la mer, flentes; elle nous séparait de la terre natale!
From the garden, we climbed the hills and stopped at the foot of the lookout's flagpole. The new French flag flew above our heads; like Virgil's women, we gazed out at the sea, gazing longingly; it separated us from our homeland!

Amid an economic crisis in 1908, protesters in the capital Saint-Pierre carried the flag of the United States while marching through the commune. The protesters viewed the U.S. flag as a symbol of freedom, while their opponents viewed it as a rejection of the French metropole. The intention of the gesture was debated in both houses of the French Parliament. The debate over the matter in the French Senate concluded with the passing of a motion to increase a grant to Saint Pierre and Miquelon by $4,000.

In the 1960s, Léon Joner of Saint-Pierre designed Saint Pierre and Miquelon's official coat of arms based on a 1947 revenue stamp issued by local authorities. Later, in the 1980s, another local, André Paturel, was inspired by an idea from Jean-Paul Dunan to simplify the coat of arms into a flag. After a few minor modifications, Paturel completed his design, which has since become a widely-used but unofficial symbol of Saint Pierre and Miquelon.

The flag of France in 1793

The flag of the United States in 1908

Coat of arms of Saint Pierre and Miquelon

== Design and symbolism ==
The elements of the unofficial flag of Saint Pierre and Miquelon reflect the archipelago's history and people. The flag is a blue field charged with a yellow silhouette of the Grande Hermine, the sailing ship that French explorer Jacques Cartier was on when he first reached the island of Saint Pierre on 15 June 1536. Most of Saint Pierre and Miquelon's residents trace their ancestry back to the Basque Country, Brittany or Normandy, so the flag's hoist accordingly features those three regions' flags arranged vertically (the Ikurrina, the ermine canton of the Gwenn ha Du, and the Norman flag, respectively).

Flag of the Basque Country
(Ikurrina)

Flag of Brittany
(Gwenn ha Du)

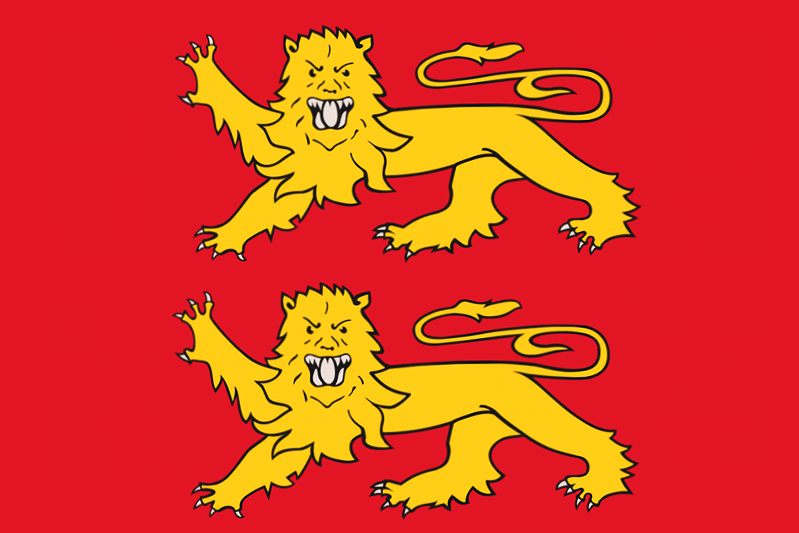
Flag of Normandy

== Status and use ==
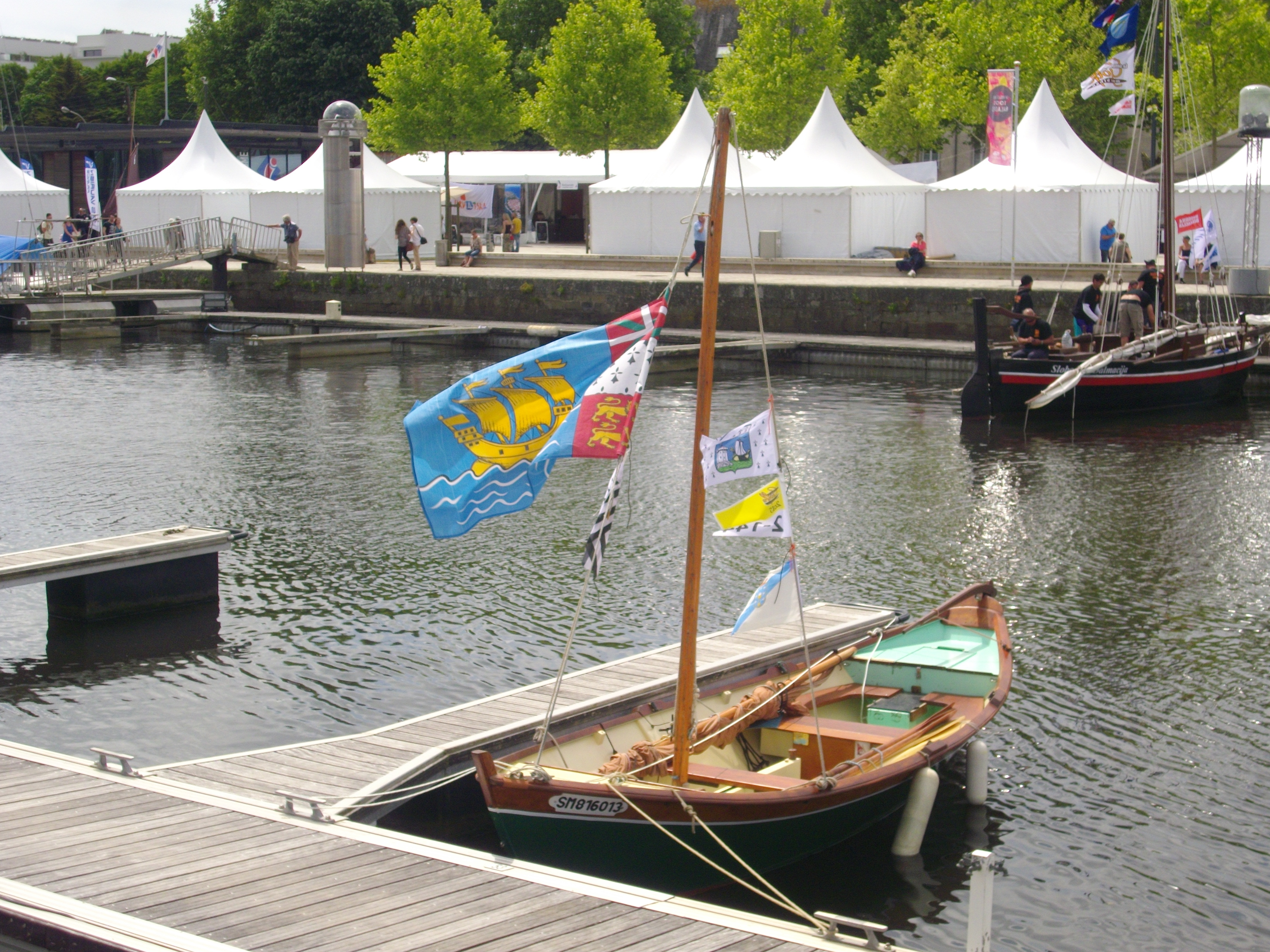
The unofficial flag of Saint Pierre and Miquelon on a boat docked in Morbihan, Brittany, France

The unofficial flag of Saint Pierre and Miquelon is displayed throughout the territory by both private citizens and public officials. It is commonly used as a civil ensign by civilian vessels. Local historian Marc Albert Cormier describes the flag as having "quasi-legal" status, noting its appearance on official documents and on flagpoles alongside the French flag.

There is no legislative or regulatory text in France in regard to what flags may be displayed on public buildings. French law only requires that the French flag take precedence over other flags and be flown in front of town halls on certain days of the year. As such, the unofficial flag of Saint Pierre and Miquelon flies below the French flag in front of the Territorial Council building. However, the town halls of the territory's two municipalities, Saint-Pierre and Miquelon-Langlade, only fly the French flag.

The unofficial flag of Saint Pierre and Miquelon has an emoji (🇵🇲) that is often used by Basques on social media because it features the Basque flag, which does not have an emoji of its own.
