= Pompogne Solar Park =

Solar farm in Aquitaine, France

- Country: France
- Location: Aquitaine
- Coordinates: 44°15′N 00°03′E
- Status: Operational
- Commission date: 25 June 2012
- Construction cost: 113 million Euro

Solar farm
- Type: Flat-panel PV
- Site area: 75 ha

Power generation
- Units operational: 175,000
- Nameplate capacity: 40 MW

The Pompogne Solar Park is a 40 MW solar farm in France. It has about 175,000 photovoltaics panels made by REC Solar.

== See also ==
- Photovoltaic power station
- List of photovoltaic power stations
