= Coat of arms of Saint Pierre and Miquelon =

- Armiger: Saint Pierre and Miquelon
- Crest: A naval crown Or
- Shield: Azure, sailing in the sea proper a carrack Or, on a chief gules a pale ermine between in dexter a saltire vert surmounted by a cross argent, and in sinister two lions passant gardant in pale of the second armed and langued of the first.
- Motto: "A mare labor" (Work from the Sea)
- Other elements: Behind the shield two anchors saltireways sable

The coat of arms of Saint Pierre and Miquelon is the official heraldic symbol of the French overseas collectivity of Saint Pierre and Miquelon. It was designed by Léon Joner of Saint-Pierre.

== Description ==
The main part of the shield is blue with a yellow ship, representing the Grande Hermine, which brought Jacques Cartier to Saint Pierre on June 15, 1536. Three square flags placed along the top recall the origin of most inhabitants of the islands, from left to right, Basques, Bretons, and Normans. It is crowned with a naval crown.

The unofficial flag of Saint Pierre and Miquelon recapitulates elements of the coat of arms.

== See also ==
- Flag of Saint Pierre and Miquelon
- Flag of France
- National emblem of France
