= Norman language =

Romance language of northwest France

Norman
- Normaund
- Native to: Normandy (Cotentin Peninsula and Pays de Caux); Channel Islands (Jersey, Guernsey, Sark)
- Region: Normandy
- Ethnicity: Normans
- Native speakers: 19,000 (2011–2015)
- Language family: Indo-European: Italic; Latino-Faliscan; Latinic; Romance; Italo-Western; Western; Gallo-Romance; Oïl; Norman
- Early forms: Old Latin: Vulgar Latin; Proto-Romance; Old Gallo-Romance; Old French; Old Norman
- Dialects: Northern Norman; Insular Norman; Auregnais; Guernésiais; Jèrriais; Sercquiais; Augeron; Cauchois; Cotentinais; Southern Norman
- Writing system: Latin (French orthography)

Official status
- Official language in: Jersey (Jèrriais); Guernsey (Guernésiais)
- Recognised minority language in: Sark (Sercquiais); France

Language codes
- ISO 639-3: nrf
- Glottolog: norm1245
- ELP: Norman
- Linguasphere: & 51-AAA-hd 51-AAA-hc & 51-AAA-hd
- IETF: nrf
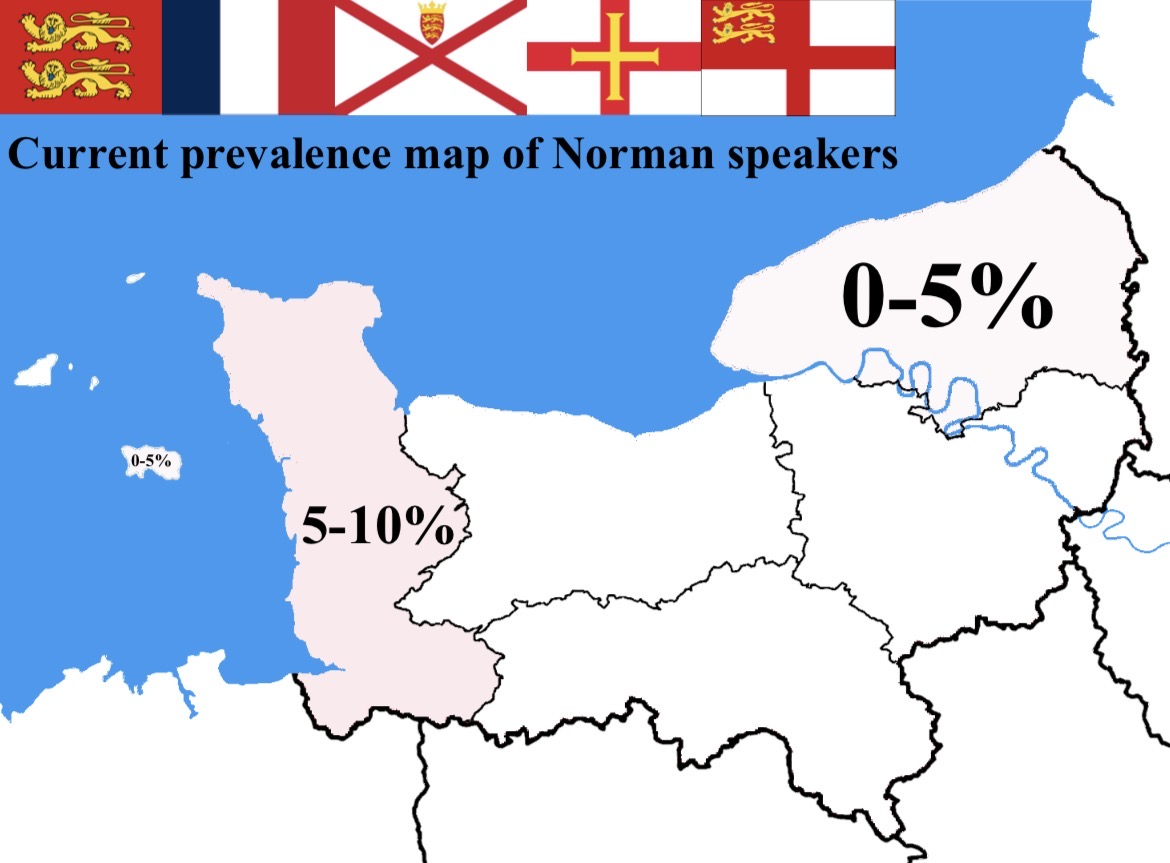
- Current prevalence map of Norman speakers

- Norman is classified as Severely Endangered by the UNESCO Atlas of the World's Languages in Danger and the Endangered Languages Project

Norman or Norman French (Normaund, French: Normand [nɔʁmɑ̃], Guernésiais: Normand, Jèrriais: Nouormand) is a langue d'oïl spoken in the historical and cultural region of Normandy.

The name "Norman French" is sometimes also used to describe the administrative languages of Anglo-Norman and Law French used in England. For the most part, the written forms of Norman and modern French are mutually intelligible. The thirteenth-century philosopher Roger Bacon was the first to distinguish it along with other dialects such as Picard and Bourguignon.

Today, although it does not enjoy any official status outside of Jersey, some reports of the French Ministry of Culture have recognized it as one of the regional languages of France.

== History ==
When Norse Vikings from modern day Scandinavia arrived in Neustria, in the western part of the Kingdom of the Franks, and settled the land that became known as Normandy, these North-Germanic–speaking people came to live among a local Gallo-Romance–speaking population. In time, the communities converged, so that Normandy continued to form the name of the region while the original Norsemen were largely assimilated by the Gallo-Romance people, adopting their speech but still contributing some elements from Old Norse language and Norse culture. Later, when conquering England, the Norman rulers in England would eventually assimilate, thereby adopting the speech of the local English. In both cases, the elites contributed elements of their own language to the newly enriched languages that developed in the territories.

In Normandy, the Norman language inherited only some 150 words from Old Norse. The influence on phonology is disputed, although it is argued that the retention of aspirated /h/ and /k/ in Norman is due to Norse influence.

== Geographical distribution ==
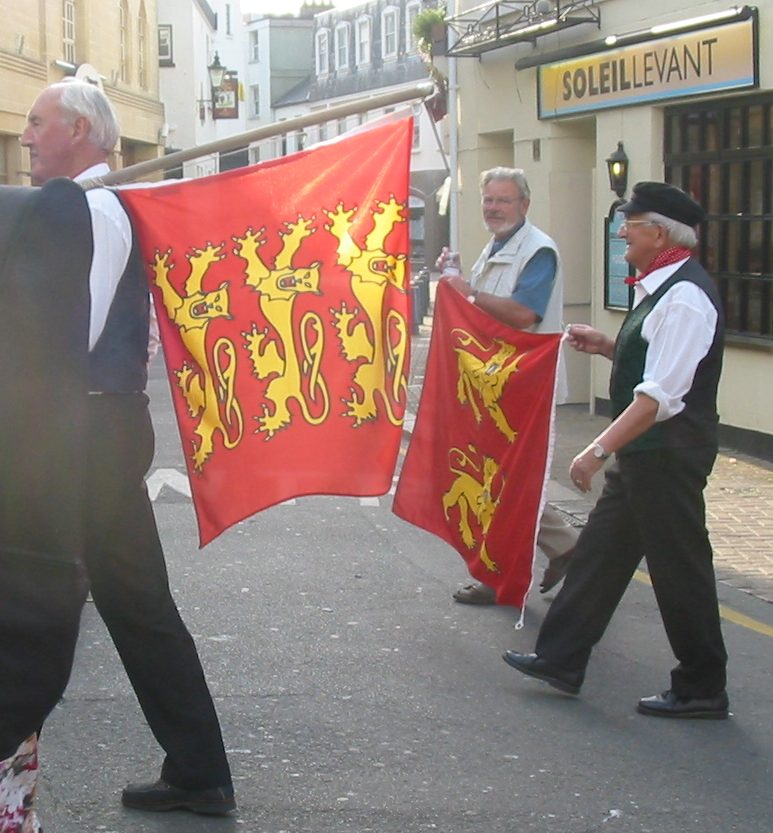
Norman flags at a Norman language festival in Jersey in 2005.

Norman is spoken in mainland Normandy in France, where it has no official status, but is classed as a regional language. It is taught in a few colleges near Cherbourg-Octeville.

In the Channel Islands, the Norman language has developed separately, but not in isolation, to form:

- Jèrriais (in Jersey)
- Guernésiais or Dgèrnésiais or Guernsey French (in Guernsey)
- Sercquiais (or Sarkese, in Sark)
- Auregnais (in Alderney)

The British and Irish governments recognize Jèrriais and Guernésiais as regional languages within the framework of the British–Irish Council. Sercquiais is in fact a descendant of the 16th-century Jèrriais used by the original colonists from Jersey who settled the then uninhabited island.

The last first-language speakers of Auregnais, the dialect of Norman spoken on Alderney, died during the 20th century, although some rememberers are still alive. The dialect of Herm also lapsed at an unknown date; the patois spoken there was likely Guernésiais (Herm was not inhabited all year round in the Norman culture's heyday).

An isogloss termed the "Joret line" (ligne Joret) separates the northern and southern dialects of the Norman language (the line runs from Granville, Manche to the French-speaking Belgian border in the province of Hainaut and Thiérache). Dialectal differences also distinguish western and eastern dialects.

Three different standardized spellings are used: continental Norman, Jèrriais, and Dgèrnésiais. These represent the different developments and particular literary histories of the varieties of Norman. Norman may therefore be described as a pluricentric language.

The Anglo-Norman dialect of Norman served as a language of administration in England following the Norman conquest of England in 1066. This left a legacy of Law French in the language of English courts (though it was also influenced by Parisian French). In Ireland, Norman remained strongest in the area of south-east Ireland, where the Hiberno-Normans invaded in 1169. Norman remains in (limited) use for some very formal legal purposes in the UK, such as when the monarch gives royal assent to an Act of Parliament using the phrase, "Le Roy (la Reyne) le veult" ("The King (the Queen) wills it").

The Norman conquest of southern Italy in the 11th and 12th centuries brought the language to Sicily and the southern part of the Italian Peninsula, where it may have left a few words in the Sicilian language. See: Norman and French influence on Sicilian.

Literature in Norman ranges from early Anglo-Norman literature through the 19th-century Norman literary renaissance to modern writers (see list of Norman-language writers).

As of 2017, the Norman language remains strongest in the less accessible areas of the former Duchy of Normandy: the Channel Islands and the Cotentin Peninsula (Cotentinais) in the west, and the Pays de Caux (Cauchois dialect) in the east. Ease of access from Paris and the popularity of the coastal resorts of central Normandy, such as Deauville, in the 19th century led to a significant loss of distinctive Norman culture in the central low-lying areas of Normandy.

=== Old French influences ===
Norman French preserves a number of Old French words which have been lost in Modern French. Examples of Norman French words of Old French origin:

Norman French	Old French	French	Meaning
alosier	alosier	se vanter, se targuer	to brag, to pride oneself on
ardre	ardre, ardeir	brûler	to burn
caeir	caeir, caïr	«choir», tomber	to drop, to fall over
calengier	calungier, chalongier (became challenge in English)	négocier, débattre	to negotiate, to argue
d'ot	od, ot	avec	with
de l'hierre (f.) de l'hierru (m.)	de l'iere	du lierre	from the ivy / some ivy
déhait	dehait	chagrin, malheur	grief, hardship
ébauber, ébaubir	esbaubir	étonner	to surprise
éclairgir	esclargier	éclaircir	to lighten
écourre	escurre, escudre	secouer	to shake, to mix
essourdre	essurdre, exsurdre	élever	to raise, to lift
haingre (adj.)	haingre	maigre	thin, skinny
haingue (f.)	haenge	haine	hatred
haiset (m.)	haise	barrière or clôture de jardin faites de branches	garden fence
herdre	erdre	adhérer, être adhérant, coller	to adhere, to stick
hourder	order	souiller	to make something dirty
iloc (with a silent c)	iloc, iluec	là	there
itel / intel	itel	semblable	similar
liement	liement, liéement	tranquillement	quietly, peacefully
maishî	maishui, meshui	maintenant, désormais	now, from now on
manuyaunce	manuiance	avoir la jouissance, la possession	to enjoy
marcaundier	marcandier	rôdeur, vagabond	prowler, stalker
marcauntier	marcantier	mouchard, colporteur	canary
marganer	marganer	moquer	to make fun of, to mock
marganier	marganier	moqueur, quelqu'un qui se moque	mocking, teasing
méhain	meshaing, mehain	mauvaise disposition, malaise	loss of consciousness, feeling of faintness
méhaignié	meshaignié	malade, blessé	sick, injured
méselle	mesele	lèpre	leprosy
mésiau or mésel	mesel	lépreux	leper
moûtrer	mustrer	montrer	to show
muchier	mucier	cacher	to conceal / to hide
nartre (m.)	nastre	traître	traitor
nâtre (adj.)	nastre	méchant, cruel	mean, nasty
nienterie (f.)	nienterie	niaiserie	nonsense, insanity
orde	ort	sale	dirty
ordir	ordir	salir	to dirty
paumpe (f.)	pampe	en normand: tige en anc. fr.: pétale	petal
souleir	soleir	«souloir», avoir l'habitude de	to have habit of / to get used to
targier or tergier	targier	tarder	to be late / slow
tître	tistre	tisser	to weave
tolir	tolir	priver, enlever	to remove, to take away
trétous	trestuz	tous, absolument tous	all of / each and every

Examples of Norman French words with -ei instead of -oi in Standard French words

Norman French	Standard French	Meaning
la feire	la foire	fair (trade show)
la feis	la fois	time
la peire	la poire	pear
le deigt	le doigt	finger
le dreit	le droit	right (law)
le peivre	le poivre	pepper
aveir (final r is silent)	avoir	to have
beire	boire	to drink
creire	croire	to believe
neir (final r is silent)	noir	black
veir (final r is silent)	voir	to see

Examples of Norman French words with c- / qu- and g- instead of ch- and j in Standard French

Norman French	Standard French	Meaning
la cauche	la chausse, la chaussure	shoes
la cose	la chose	thing
la gaumbe	la jambe	leg
la quièvre	la chèvre	goat
la vaque	la vache	cow
le cat	le chat	cat
le câtel (final l is silent)	le château	castle
le quien	le chien	dog
cachier	chasser	to chase / to hunt
catouiller	chatouiller	to tickle
caud	chaud	hot

=== Norse influences ===
Examples of Norman words of Norse origin:

English	Norman French	Old Norse	Scandinavian reflexes	French
bait	baite, bète, abète	beita	beita (Icelandic), beite (Norw.), bete (Swed.)	appât; boëtte (from Breton; maybe ultimately from Norman)
beach grass, dune grass	milgreu, melgreu	*melgrös, pl. of *melgras	melgrös, pl. of melgras (Icelandic)	oyat
(black) currant	gade, gadelle, gradelle, gradille	gaddʀ	(-)	cassis, groseille
damp (cf. muggy), humid	mucre	mykr (cf. English muck)	myk (Norw.)	humide
down (feather)	dun, dum, dumet, deumet	dúnn	dúnn (Icelandic), dun (Dan., Norw., Swed.)	duvet (from Norman)
dune, sandy land	mielle, mièle	melʀ	melur (Icelandic), mile (Dan.), mjele (Norw.), mjälla (Swed.)	dune, terrain sableux
earthnut, groundnut, pignut, peanut	génotte, gernotte, jarnotte	*jarðhnot	jarðhneta (Icelandic), jordnød (Dan.), jordnöt (Swed.), jordnøtt (Norw.)	arachide, cacahuète
islet	hommet/houmet	hólmʀ	hólmur (Icelandic), holm (Dan.), holme (Norw., Swed.)	îlot, rocher en mer
mound (cf. howe, high)	hougue	haugʀ	haugur (Icelandic), haug (Norw.), hög (Swe.), høj (Dan.)	monticule
ness (headland or cliff, cf. Sheerness, etc.)	nez	nes	nes (Icelandic, Norw.), næs (Dan.), näs (Swed.)	cap, pointe de côte
seagull	mauve, mave, maôve	mávaʀ (pl.)	mávar (pl.) (Icelandic), måge (Dan.), måke/måse (Norw.), mås (Swed.)	mouette, goëland
slide, slip	griller, égriller, écriller	*skriðla	overskride (Norw.), skrilla (Old Swed.), skriða (Icelandic), skride (Dan.)	glisser
wicket (borrowed from Norman)	viquet, (-vic, -vy, -vouy in place-names)	vík	vík (Icelandic), vig (Dan.), vik (Norw., Swed.)	guichet (borrowed from Norman)

In some cases, Norse words adopted in Norman have been borrowed into French; more recently, some of the English words used in French can be traced back to Norman origins.

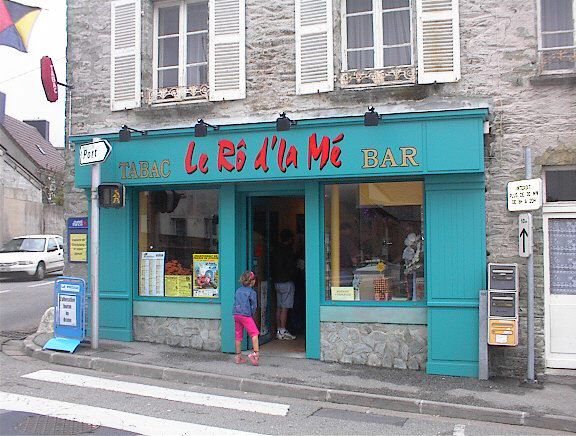
A bar named in Norman (Cherbourg, 2002)

=== Influence of Norman on English language ===
Following the Norman conquest of England in 1066, the Norman and other languages and dialects spoken by the new rulers of England were used for several hundred years, developing into the unique insular dialect now known as Anglo-Norman French, and leaving traces of specifically Norman words that can be distinguished from the equivalent lexical items in Standard French:

English	Norman French	Standard French
cabbage	< caboche	= chou (cf. caboche)
castle	< castel (borrowed from Occitan)	= château-fort, castelet
catch	< cachier (now cachi)	= chasser
cater	< acater	= acheter
cattle	< *cate(-l)	= cheptel (Old French chetel)
cauldron	< caudron	= chaudron
causeway	< caucie (now cauchie)	= chaussée
cherry (ies)	< cherise (chrise, chise)	= cerise
fashion	< faichon	= façon
fork	< fouorque	= fourche
garden	< gardin	= jardin
kennel	< kenil	= chenil (Vulgar Latin *canile)
mug	< mogue/moque	= mug, boc
pocket	< pouquette	= poche
poor	< paur	= pauvre
wait	< waitier (Old Norman)	= gaitier (mod. guetter)
war	< werre (Old Norman)	= guerre
warrior	< werreur (Old Norman)	= guerrier
wicket	< viquet	= guichet (cf. piquet)

Other borrowings, such as canvas, captain, cattle and kennel, exemplify how Norman retained Latin /k/ that was not retained in French.

In the United Kingdom, Acts of Parliament are confirmed with the words "Le Roy le veult" ("The King wishes it") and other Norman phrases are used on formal occasions as legislation progresses.

=== Norman immigration in Canada ===
Norman immigrants to North America also introduced some "Normanisms" to Quebec French and the French language in Canada generally. Joual, a working class sociolect of Quebec, in particular exhibits a Norman influence. For example, the word "placoter," which can mean both to splash around or to chatter, comes from the Normand French word "clapoter," which means the same thing.

== See also ==
- Norman toponymy
- Joret line

== Sources ==
- Essai de grammaire de la langue normande, UPN, 1995. ISBN 2-9509074-0-7.
- V'n-ous d'aveu mei? UPN, 1984.
- La Normandie dialectale, 1999, ISBN 2-84133-076-1
- Alain Marie, Les auteurs patoisants du Calvados, 2005. ISBN 2-84706-178-9.
- Roger Jean Lebarbenchon, Les Falaises de la Hague, 1991. ISBN 2-9505884-0-9.
- Jean-Louis Vaneille, Les patoisants bas-normands, n.d., Saint-Lô.
- André Dupont, Dictionnaire des patoisants du Cotentin, Société d'archéologie de la Manche, Saint-Lô, 1992.
- Geraint Jennings and Yan Marquis, "The Toad and the Donkey: an anthology of Norman literature from the Channel Islands", 2011, ISBN 978-1-903427-61-3
