= Grande Hermine =

Ship believed to have brought Jacques Cartier to Saint-Pierre in 1535

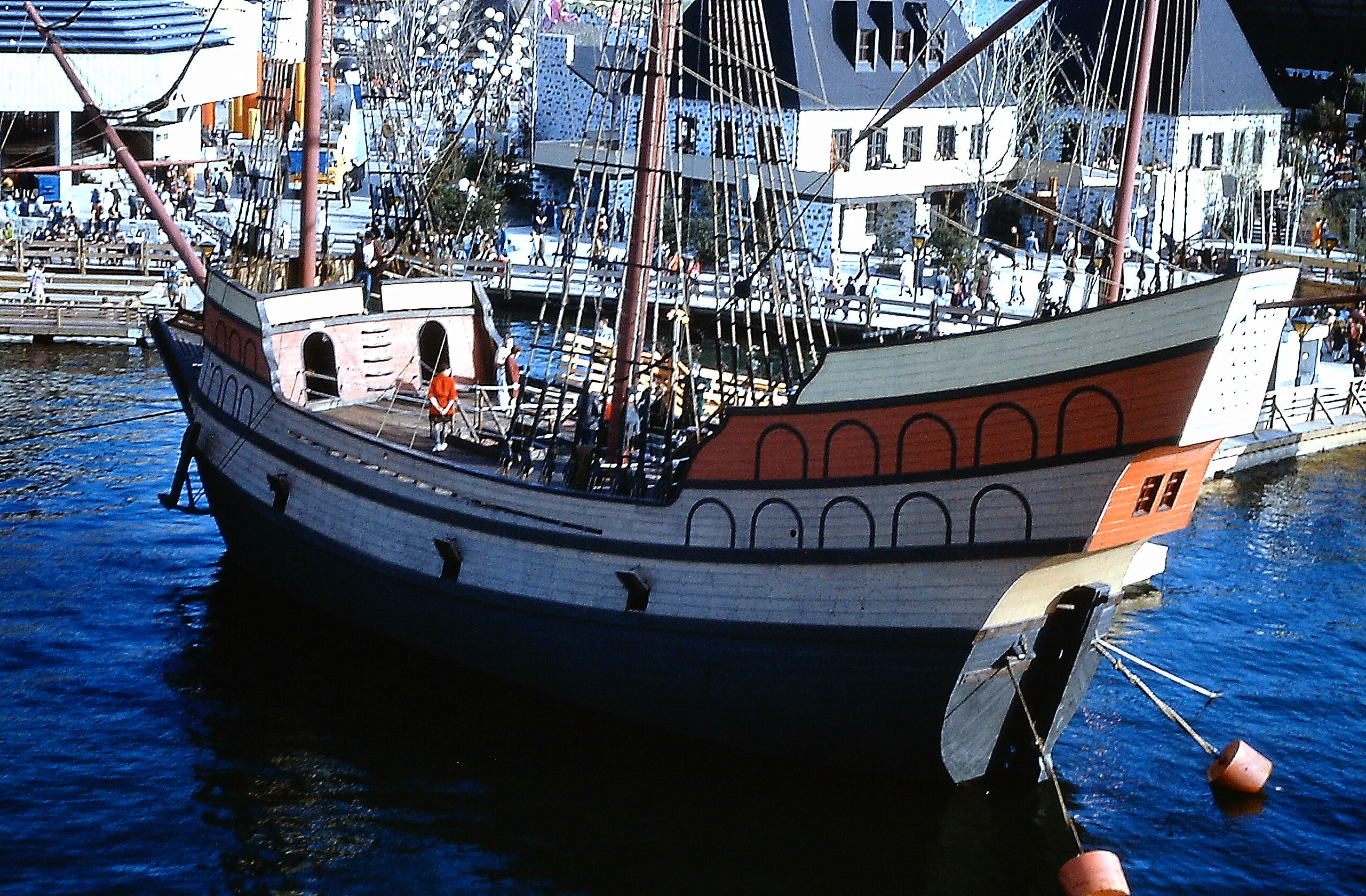
Authentic wooden replica La Grande Hermine at Expo-67 in Montreal

The unofficial flag of Saint Pierre and Miquelon featuring a stylized representation of the Grande Hermine on the fly

Grande Hermine (French: [ɡʁɑ̃d ɛʁmin]; "great ermine") was the name of the carrack that brought Jacques Cartier to Saint-Pierre on 15 June 1535, and upon which he discovered the estuary of the St. Lawrence River and the St. Lawrence Iroquoian settlement of Stadacona (near current-day Quebec City). She is believed to be represented in the local flag of Saint Pierre and Miquelon (the yellow ship). It is also featured on the Amory Adventure Award of Canadian Scouting. La Grande Hermine was the second ship Jacques Cartier used when exploring the St. Lawrence River.

== Replicas ==
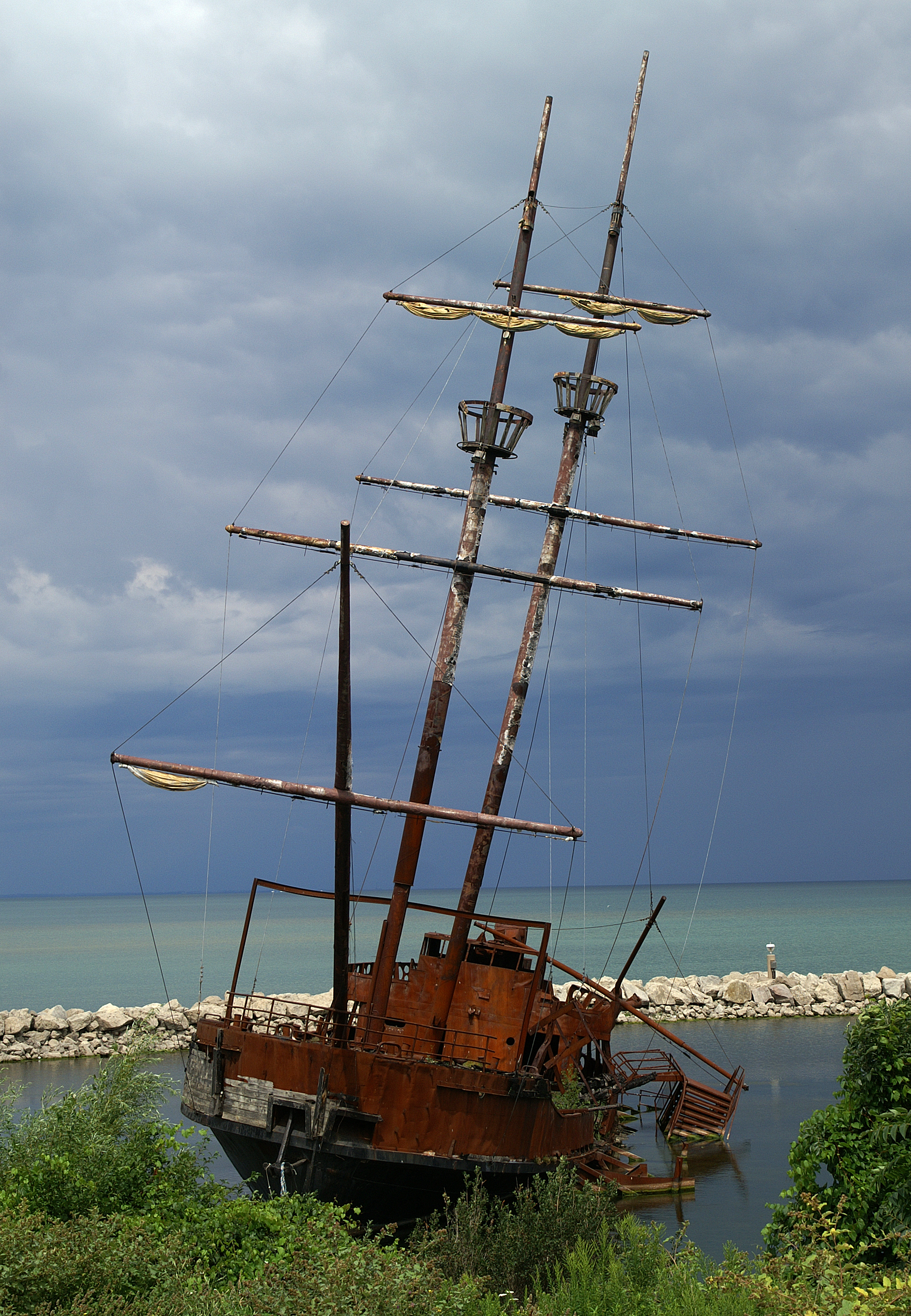
Steel-hull pseudo-replica La Grande Hermine abandoned and burned

A life-size wooden replica of the vessel was built in Quebec in 1914 and was featured at the Expo 67 in Montreal (1967) where she served as a floating restaurant. Following the Expo the replica was moved to Quebec City and put on static display in an artificial pond located in a city park, where she remained for at least three decades; poorly maintained. She was broken up in the same park where she sat for years.

Another unrelated replica, possibly based on the steel hull of a 1914 ferry or a 1941 icebreaker, was purchased by a businessman with the intention of moving her to Ontario and re-opening the restaurant or perhaps turning the boat into a casino, however, the person who was behind these ideas died before his ideas came to life. The ship was moved to Jordan Harbour in 1997 and sat there unused. In January 2003, the ship was destroyed by an arson fire. The burned-out hull sat in the harbour, located between the 55- and 57-kilometre markers on the Queen Elizabeth Way.

On December 20, 2021, the 4 masts were removed due to unsafe conditions and years of deterioration, with the entirety of the ship being removed sometime in the future.

Under order of the Canadian Coast Guard, on October 22, 2024, the demolition and removal of the remaining parts of the ship began and remediation was completed by December 2024.
