= Cauchois dialect =

Norman dialect

Cauchois
- Caucheis
- Region: Pays de Caux
- Native speakers: (undated figure of c. 50,000)
- Language family: Indo-European: Italic; Latino-Faliscan; Latinic; Romance; Italo-Western; Western; Gallo-Iberian?; Gallo-Romance; Gallo-Rhaetian?; Arpitan–Oïl; Oïl; Frankish zone; Northern Norman; Cauchois
- Early forms: Old Latin: Vulgar Latin; Proto-Romance; Old Gallo-Romance; Old French; Old Norman

Language codes
- ISO 639-3: –
- Glottolog: None
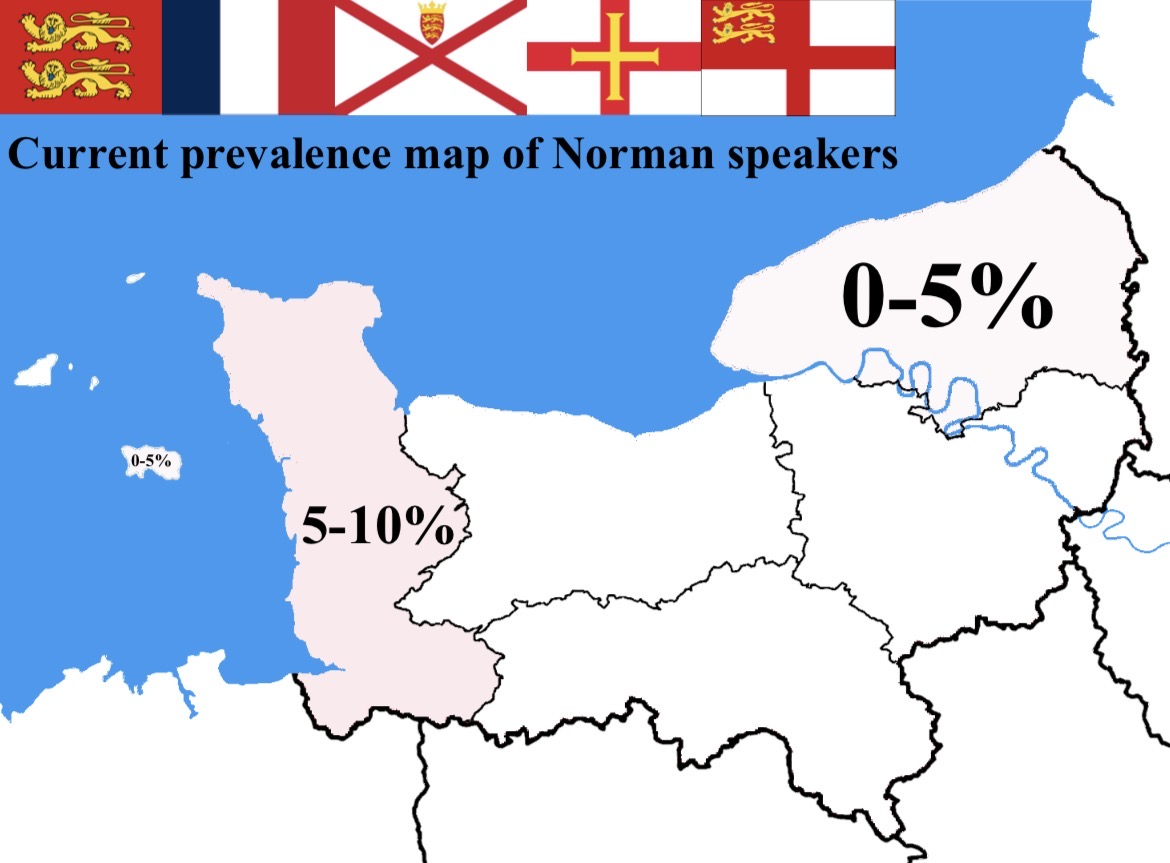
- Current prevalence map of Norman speakers

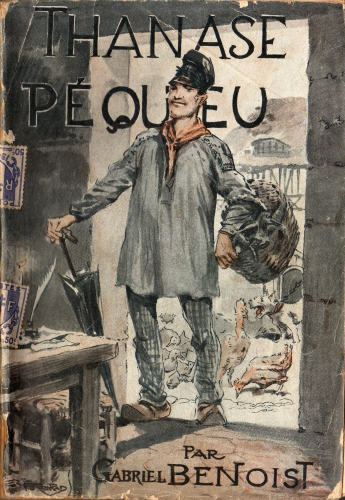
Les Histouères de Thanase Pèqueu, published Rouen in 1933, a collection of stories in Cauchois by Gabriel Benoist.

Cauchois (French pronunciation: [koʃwa]; Norman: Caucheis) is one of the eastern dialects of the Norman language that is spoken in and takes its name from the Pays de Caux region of the Seine-Maritime department.

== Status ==
The Pays de Caux is one of the remaining strongholds of the Norman language outside the Cotentin. Statistics give a wide range of interpretations as to numbers of speakers: between 0.3% and 19.1% of residents of Seine-Maritime identify themselves as speakers of Cauchois.

== Phonology ==
These are some distinguishing features of Cauchois from other Norman dialects:

- the absence of /h/
- the loss of /r/ between vowels
- a greater tendency to metathesis than in western dialects: e(u)j instead of jé (English I), eud instead of dé (of), euq instead of qué (that), eul instead of lé (the)

== Literature ==
Literature in Norman is published in magazines, both in mainland Normandy and the Channel Islands, such as Le Pucheux from the Pays de Caux. This issue from 2005 highlights language and literature from across the Norman-speaking regions.

The Purin literature of the 17th and 18th centuries, published in Rouen, is the earliest Norman literature displaying Cauchois features. However, the Norman literary revival, which started in the Channel Islands and Cotentin in the 19th century, was not reflected in the Pays de Caux until the early 20th century. From 1910 onwards, a range of literature was produced; one of the features of Norman literature characteristic of Cauchois literature was the mixture of French and Norman. In Lower Normandy, Norman literature since the revival period has tended to be as exclusively Norman as possible. In the Pays de Caux, by contrast, alongside literature written exclusively in Cauchois, a genre of literature developed in which narrative is written in French and dialogue in Cauchois, or dialogue is written in French or Cauchois, according to the language of the character.

Notable writers in Cauchois include Gabriel Benoist (author of the Thanase Pèqueu stories), Ernest Morel, Gaston Demongé, Maurice Le Sieutre and Marceau Rieul. Jehan Le Povremoyne (pseudonym of Ernest Coquin) wrote stories of the mixed dialogue genre, as did Raymond Mensire.

== See also ==
- List of Norman language writers
