= Integration of Normandy into the royal domain of the Kingdom of France =

The integration of Normandy into the royal domain of the Kingdom of France is the process of conquering and integrating the Duchy of Normandy into the domain directly under the French crown. Normandy, created in 911, was dominated by the Duke of Normandy, vassal of the King of France. This marked the beginning of a struggle between the kings of France and the dukes, the latter paying only symbolic homage to their suzerain. In 1066, William the Conqueror, then Duke of Normandy, seized the crown of England and became more powerful than the King of France. The Angevin Empire would later represent a threat to the stability of the French kingdom, which the kings of France would endeavor to break up.

In 1202, the King of England, John Lackland, had the Duchy of Normandy confiscated by the King of France, Philip Augustus, for disobeying his orders. Following the French military conquest of the whole of Normandy, with the exception of the Channel Islands, the province came under the direct control of the French crown, which implemented the social policy of assimilating the province.

Subsequently, the kings of England made several unsuccessful attempts to regain control of the province. In 1259, the two kings signed the Treaty of Paris, under which the English crown officially renounced the province in exchange for a few fiefs in the southwest. The French conquest was definitively confirmed, and in 1315 the King of France completed the process of assimilating the Normans by granting the Charte aux Normands, which limited the sovereign's rights in the province until it was repealed during the French Revolution.

== The status of the Duchy of Normandy (911–1199) ==
The Duchy of Normandy between 911 and 1050.

=== The Duchy of Normandy (911–1199) ===
Normandy was born in 911, when Charles the Simple, King of West Francia, ceded part of Neustria to the Viking Rollo at the Treaty of Saint-Clair-sur-Epte. Although Normandy may have been totally independent in its early years, as the Viking chieftain was unaware of the feudal system, it soon became a fiefdom in which its chieftain had to pay tribute to the King of France as a vassal. The feudal system meant that the Duke of Normandy behaved like the head of a quasi-sovereign state. Before 1140, he never traveled to pay homage to the King of France. The huestes that the vassal owed to the king were kept very symbolic by the dukes of Normandy, who sent only a few dozen men for forty days, even though they could raise several thousand. With few exceptions, the Dukes of Normandy were rarely present at the court of the King of France, even though they were theoretically obliged to do so. Nevertheless, although the link between Normandy and France is very weak, it did exist, and the Duchy of Normandy was part of the Kingdom of France.

On his territory, the Duke of Normandy exercised many of the rights previously exercised by the Carolingian kings, such as those over the Church, justice, and taxation. He alone had the power to build fortresses and castles, mint coins, and levy direct taxes, which were extremely rare at the time. The dukes established an efficient administration and a feudal organization that reinforced their power, rather than crumbling it, as was the case in several other principalities in the Kingdom of France. On the ground, the Duke of Normandy was represented by viscounts who controlled the judicial system to the detriment of local lords. This system made the Duke of Normandy one of the most powerful lords of the early second millennium, sometimes more powerful than his lord the King of France.

=== In the Angevin Empire ===
==== Under Philip I of France ====
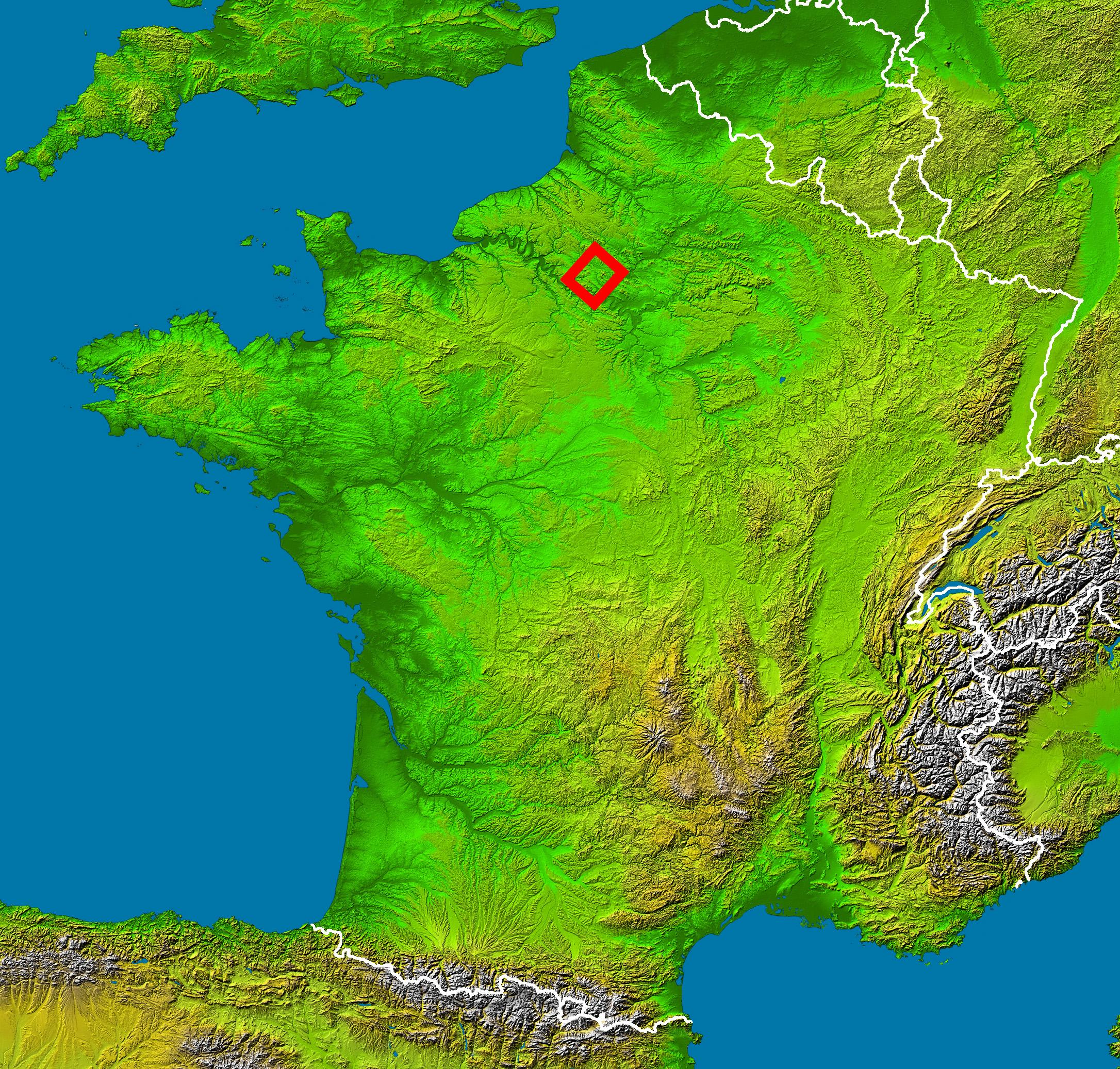
Location of the anciente French Vexin province.

In 1066, William the Conqueror seized the crown of England. From then on, the Duke of Normandy held the title of Duke of Normandy (still vassal to the King of France) as well as King of England (sovereign in his own kingdom), except between 1087 and 1106. From then on, the kings of France gradually realized that they had to break up the Anglo-Norman Empire, which represented an immediate danger to their crown. If Philip I, King of France, could do nothing to prevent William from seizing the English crown, it was because he was only fourteen and under the guardianship of Baldwin V of Flanders, the father-in-law of the Duke of Normandy. But as soon as he came of age, he realized the danger of the Anglo-Norman Empire. He first prevented Normandy from expanding into the Duchy of Brittany with the campaign of 1076, which forced the Conqueror to lift the siege of Dol. Then, the following year, Philip I captured the French Vexin at the expense of Simon de Crépy. The French Vexin became a source of war between the Dukes of Normandy and the Kings of France. In 1087, William the Conqueror claimed it, then in 1097-1098 his son William the Red invaded.

The King of France pursued his policy of separating Normandy from England by supporting Robert Curthose, the Conqueror's eldest son, in his fight against his father for the title of Duke of Normandy in 1077–1078. This policy succeeded in 1087, when the Empire was split between William the Conqueror's two sons, with Robert Curthose inheriting Normandy and William the Red the crown of England. In 1089, he sided with Robert Curthose in defending Normandy against attacks by William the Red. The end of his reign was less far-sighted: he did not oppose Robert's decision to entrust his duchy to his brother, the King of England, for the first crusade. Nor did he object, in 1106, when Henry I of England, third son of the Conqueror and who had just succeeded his brother on the throne of England, clashed with Robert Curthose, his other brother, over Normandy, leading to the reconstitution of the Anglo-Norman Empire after the battle of Tinchebray.

==== Under Louis VI of France ====
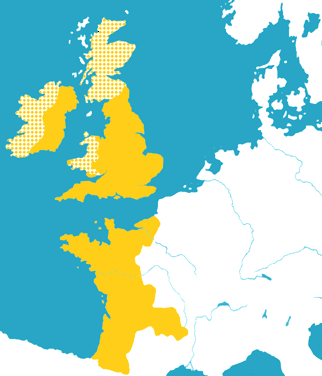
Expansion of the Angevin Empire from 1144 to 1166.

Louis VI the Fighter became King of France in 1108. He was soon confronted by Henry I of England, Duke of Normandy, who wanted to add Gisors to his possessions. War broke out, but was interrupted in 1113 by the King of France due to unrest in the royal domain. Hostilities resumed in 1116, and the King of France unsuccessfully supported William Adelin, son of Robert Curthose, in his fight against his uncle for the title of Duke of Normandy. Two years later, Louis VI entered the French Vexin and took control as far as the Andelle, while his ally Fulk the Younger, Count of Anjou, won several battles near Alençon. Success was short-lived for the King of France, who lost his allies in turn, and was defeated at the Battle of Bremule in 1119. Pope Calixtus II was asked to mediate, and peace was restored on the basis of the status quo. However, the King of France succeeded in obtaining the tribute of William Adelin, son of Henry I of England, for Normandy, as the latter was unwilling to bow to another king.

William Adelin died the following year in the shipwreck of the White Ship, and his death enabled William Clito to form a grand coalition against his uncle, which the King of France entered in 1122. War broke out in the French Vexin, but Henry I of England managed to convince his son-in-law Henri V of the Holy Roman Empire to attack the French king, who had to concentrate the bulk of his forces on Reims. By stopping the forces of the Holy Roman Empire, Louis VI impressed the King of England, who in turn intimidated the King of France by convincing the Germans to attack the French. This led to peace in 1124 between the kingdom of France and the Anglo-Norman Empire, which lasted thirty years, despite several occasions, notably the death of Henry I of England in 1135, when a war of succession broke out that the French king did not exploit. Similarly, in 1137, he granted Normandy to Stephen of Blois, through his son Eustace of Blois, to the detriment of Geoffrey Plantagenet, even though Stephen already controlled England.

==== Under Louis VII of France ====
Louis VII was crowned King of France in 1137. He followed the same policy as his father, recognizing the Duchy of Normandy from Eustace IV, Count of Boulogne. It wasn't until Geoffrey Plantagenet conquered Normandy in 1144 that the King of France switched sides and invested it against the King of England. In 1152, he had his marriage to Eleanor of Aquitaine annulled, and two months later she remarried the future King of England, Henry II, who became Duke of Aquitaine, in addition to his titles of Duke of Normandy and Count of Anjou, Maine and Touraine. Immediately afterwards, the King of France attacked Normandy in an attempt to loosen the stranglehold that Plantagenet power was beginning to exert. Henri II had no trouble repelling the French king's troops. Later, after Henry II was recognized as King of England in 1154, he supported the latter's brother Geoffrey and won Henry's homage for his continental lands. In 1159, the King of France agreed to a marriage between his daughter Margaret and the son of the King of England, Henry the Younger, which brought the Norman Vexin to the latter's lands, but Henry II immediately seized it, violating the treaty signed with the King of France. In 1169, after a diplomatic war that saw French and Anglo-Norman troops clash on the battlefield, the King of France received the tribute of Henry the Younger and the future Richard the Lionheart for the continental lands, including Normandy, but had to acknowledge the King of England's conquest of the Duchy of Brittany.

==== Under Philip II of France ====
The kingdom of France in 1180.

Philippe Auguste became king at the age of fifteen, in 1180. At the beginning of his reign, relations with his powerful vassal across the Channel were cordial, and the latter did not intervene when Philippe Auguste's mother sought Henry II's protection after her son had seized part of her domain following his marriage to Isabelle de Hainaut. Henri II even saved his suzerain, sending his sons to help Philip when the latter had to face a feudal coalition directed against him. But relations soon deteriorated, as the King of France took advantage of the quarrels of succession in what had become the Angevin Empire to support Geoffrey, Duke of Brittany, against his brother Richard the Lionheart, heir presumptive to the Empire. Geoffroy's brutal death in 1186 thwarted the French king's plans, but after conquering Châteauroux, he succeeded in persuading Richard, and a two-year truce was concluded between the two princes, which greatly worried the King of England. War resumed in 1188, and Philip Augustus reconquered part of the Vexin region of Normandy, while losing land on other borders. He again made peace with Richard on Henry II's back, and in a meeting between the three parties, Richard paid homage to the King of France for all Angevine lands in the kingdom of France. The following year, they both attacked Maine and Anjou, and Henri II managed to escape from the city of Le Mans to Tours and Chinon, where he died abandoned after his second son Jean had also gone over to the enemy. Philip's death did not help, for although he had succeeded in splitting the Angevine inheritance in two, with England for Henry and the continental lands, including Normandy, for Richard, he now found himself faced with Richard as sole heir.

Richard is crowned first Duke of Normandy, then King of England. The French king's conquests of 1189 were almost all reclaimed by Richard, who left only a small part of Berry. The two kings were nevertheless obliged to come to an agreement, as they had promised to take part together in the crusade to retake Jerusalem. Before setting off, they swore friendship and loyalty to each other, but as soon as they reached the Holy Land, they began to quarrel, forcing the signing of a peace treaty in Messina in March 1191. The reason for this was that Richard had renounced his intention to marry Philip's sister Adela and returned her dowry, Gisors. At the end of the siege of Saint-Jean-d'Acre in July 1191, Philip decided to return to his kingdom, while Richard stayed on to continue the crusade; on his departure, Philip promised the King of England not to touch his possessions. Richard was taken prisoner by Leopold V of Austria on his return to Europe, and handed over to the Holy Roman Emperor Henry VI. Upon hearing the news, Philip prepared an attack to conquer Normandy, while sending money to the Emperor to convince him not to release Richard. Immediately on hearing the news, Richard's brother John, who saw himself as his successor, landed in Normandy, but the Norman barons refused to swear him in. John went to Paris to pay tribute to the King of France for his brother's continental lands. As part of this rapprochement, plans were even drawn up for the conquest of England, which ultimately came to nothing. The King of France and his new ally Jean therefore concentrated on Richard's continental lands: in April 1193, following the treachery of the châtelain, Gisors passed into the hands of the King of France, followed by the whole of the Vexin. Rouen seemed within his grasp, but the siege failed. The French king had to lift the siege with the idea of returning even stronger the following year. In the meantime, John relinquished the Norman territory east of the Seine, with the exception of the city of Rouen and its immediate suburbs, as well as part of the Eure valley, including Évreux and Verneuil, to the King of France. As John did not have the titles to relinquish part of the duchy, the King of France invaded the promised lands in February 1194, with the exception of Verneuil, which he laid siege to.

At the same time, Richard, freed by the Emperor and informed of the French king's attempts to keep him in captivity, landed in Normandy and granted a pardon to his brother John. At the end of May 1194, Richard arrived at Verneuil, whose siege had been lifted by the French before his arrival. In his capacity as châtelain d'Évreux, invested by Philippe Auguste, Jean is said to have handed over the town to his brother as a gesture of goodwill. War resumed between France and England, mainly outside Normandy, despite a few French raids near Rouen. In the summer of 1195, a conference between the two kings was held at Le Vaudreuil before the Pope. Philip, who doubted the loyalty of the place, had the castle razed to the ground in the middle of a meeting with Richard, who called in his troops, forcing the French king to flee and having the bridge over the Seine destroyed as he passed. War resumed in Normandy, and Dieppe was destroyed. Then, on 15 January 1196, the two kings signed a treaty confirming Philippe's possession of several towns, such as Vernon, Pacy, and above all Gisors, but confirming the loss of Évreux and Vaudreuil, a major loss compared to the French king's possessions in 1194. In the same year, Richard seized the island of Andeli, to build a fortress he named Château Gaillard and help defend Normandy against the French. War resumed between the two kings with varying degrees of success; at Courcelles on 28 September 1198, the King of France was almost taken prisoner by the troops of the King of England. A peace was signed in November, intended to last five years.

== The conquest (1199–1204) ==
=== Continental land confiscation ===
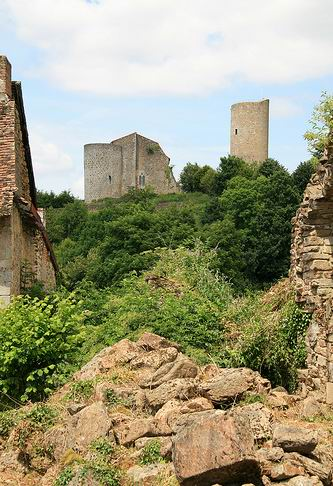
Ruin of Château de Châlus-Chabrol in 2008, where Richard the Lionheart died.

In March 1199, the death of Richard the Lionheart during the siege of the Château de Châlus-Chabrol in the Limousin region changed the face of the conflict between the King of France and his vassal. As Richard had no descendants, his death led to succession problems. On the one hand, his younger brother, John Lackland, claimed the throne as the family's eldest male descendant. On the other, Arthur of Brittany, Richard's nephew, by virtue of the right of representation his father Geoffrey would have had over all the lands had he survived Richard. England and Normandy chose John as Richard's successor, Norman custom preferring the uncle to the nephew. The latter was crowned Duke of Normandy in Rouen on 25 April 1199, and a month later King of England in London. Despite these coronations, the barons of Touraine, Anjou, and Maine chose Arthur as their sovereign, and the King of France took the opportunity to support their claims. At the same time, he seized Évreux and Conches, and advanced into Anjou on the pretext of supporting the rights of Arthur, who had been entrusted by his mother to the custody of Philippe Auguste, King of France. Thanks to this troubled succession, royal troops were able to penetrate towns hostile to John. In August 1199, a peace conference was held in Normandy between the two kings. Philip reminded him of his rights as suzerain and took advantage of John's negligence, which had done nothing to obtain his suzerain's investiture in Richard's disputed succession, to claim Anjou and Maine for Arthur (Touraine having meanwhile been recovered by Eleanor, John's mother and Duchess of Aquitaine), as well as the Norman Vexin for himself. When John refused, negotiations broke down. Shortly afterwards, William des Roches, seneschal of Anjou, joined John Lackland and obtained a reconciliation between Arthur and Jean on the back of the King of France. The latter abandoned Arthur's cause (who at the same time fled from his uncle's grip to take refuge in Angers) and signed the Treaty of Le Goulet with John, recognizing him as Richard's legitimate successor and vassal to the King of France over his continental fiefs. Arthur became John's vassal for Brittany. Philip's conquest of the county of Évreux and the Norman Vexin was confirmed. In addition, Blanche of Castille, John's niece, married Philip's son Louis. John also paid 20,000 marks for the recognition of his fiefs, especially in Brittany.

In the midst of this matrimonial dispute, Philip Augustus abandoned Normandy. Meanwhile, the Lusignan family, very important in Poitou, entered the scene. They were at odds with the House of Angoulême for possession of the county of La Marche, which had been awarded by Jean to Hugh IX de Lusignan, in return for the marriage of Isabella of Angoulême, the only daughter of Count Aymar of Angoulême, to his son and heir Hugh, to seal the peace. In July 1200, during a trip to Aquitaine, he fell in love with Isabella and kidnapped her. Jean, who had just separated from his wife, hastily married Isabelle at the end of August, much to the anger of the Lusignans, who had lost their hope in the lands of Angoulême, as Jean became heir to the Count of Angoulême. At Easter 1201, John thwarted a plot against him by seizing the Marche and seeking to confiscate the lands of the Count of Eu, who was implicated in the affair. The King of France, who had seized the opportunity to reawaken his old dream of conquering Normandy, was working to keep the peace for the time being, as he was not yet ready. The Lusignans appeal to their lord, John Lackland, who was also the offender. The latter refused to bring the case before the feudal court of Poitiers. This denial of justice prompted the Lusignans to appeal to John's suzerain for the continental lands, King Philip Augustus of France. The King of France, sensing a windfall, supported the Lusignans' cause and forced John to appear in Paris, a fortnight after Easter, to answer for the denial of justice of which he was accused. On 28 April 1202, for failing to appear and disobeying the orders of his suzerain, the King of France, the royal court confiscated from John all the continental lands he owned, including Normandy, in accordance with a procedure possible under feudal law, but rarely applied.

=== The military offensives ===
The Duchy of Normandy in the 11th century.

To enforce the sentence, the King of France resumed the war in June 1202. He first invaded Normandy from the northeast, taking control of Eu, Drincourt, Mortemer and Lions, then laid siege to Gournay, captured thanks to a ruse on the part of Philip-Augustus, who broke a dam on the Epte river that swept away the town's defenses. At the end of July, at the same time as he laid siege to Arques, Philip-Augustus promised Arthur of Brittany, in exchange for his loyalty, the hand of his daughter Mary and his investiture as count in the counties of Brittany, Poitou, Anjou, Maine and Touraine. He also armed him as a knight. On Philip's orders, Arthur immediately set off to open a second front in Poitou to conquer his future lands. Despite the help of the rebellious Poitevin lords, including the Lusignans, Arthur failed and was taken prisoner by Jean during the siege of Mirebeau. Arthur and the other captives were locked up in Falaise.

On hearing of the capture of his allies, the King of France raised the siege of Arques. Towards the end of 1202, he receives the support of the powerful seneschal of Poitou, William des Roches, who is hostile to Arthur's treatment. William brought with him not only his vassals, the Viscount of Thouars and the majority of the lords of Poitou, but also the lords of Anjou and Touraine, who thus supported their suzerain, the King of France. These submissions divided John's remaining lands into two separate geographical units, isolating Aquitaine. For the same reason, Breton and Norman lords joined the slingshot. In January 1203, the Count of Alençon, Robert I, defected to John and paid tribute to Philip for his lands, opening up Upper Normandy to the French. In April 1203, military operations resumed in Normandy; French soldiers and Norman lords in revolt against the Duke soon blocked off Normandy, with John entrenched in Pont-de-l'Arche. Jean is besieged in Normandy. At the beginning of May, two important Norman lords, Hugues de Gournay and Pierre de Meulan, switched over to the French king and surrendered their fortresses to the French, who now controlled the Risle valley. The French king then seized Beaumont-le-Roger, Conches, and other small towns. Le Vaudreuil was besieged in June, but although the town was prepared for a long siege, it immediately surrendered without a fight. In August, Philippe took Radepont, then Château-Gaillard, fortresses protecting Rouen, which was soon caught in a pincer movement. For his part, John tried to create a diversion by attacking Brittany, after several unsuccessful attacks on Alençon. In five days, he ravaged Dol and Fougères before suddenly returning to Normandy. Increasingly isolated, and a victim of French propaganda claiming that he had killed Arthur (who died in April 1203, possibly having been murdered by Jean, but contemporaries would not know for years), Jean set sail from Barfleur for England in December 1203 with, he said, the hope of raising an army.

In mid-February 1204, the King of France arrived at the fortress of Château-Gaillard, which his troops had been besieging for several months. As this fortress risked becoming a symbol of resistance for Normandy, the King of France decided to bring it down as quickly as possible. After a long and complicated siege, due to the double enclosure surrounding the fortress, the latter fell completely on 6 March 1204, its capture provoking a shock among the King of England's supporters in Normandy by opening the road to Rouen to the French, whereas, built eight years earlier by Richard the Lionheart, it was supposed to block this route for a long period.

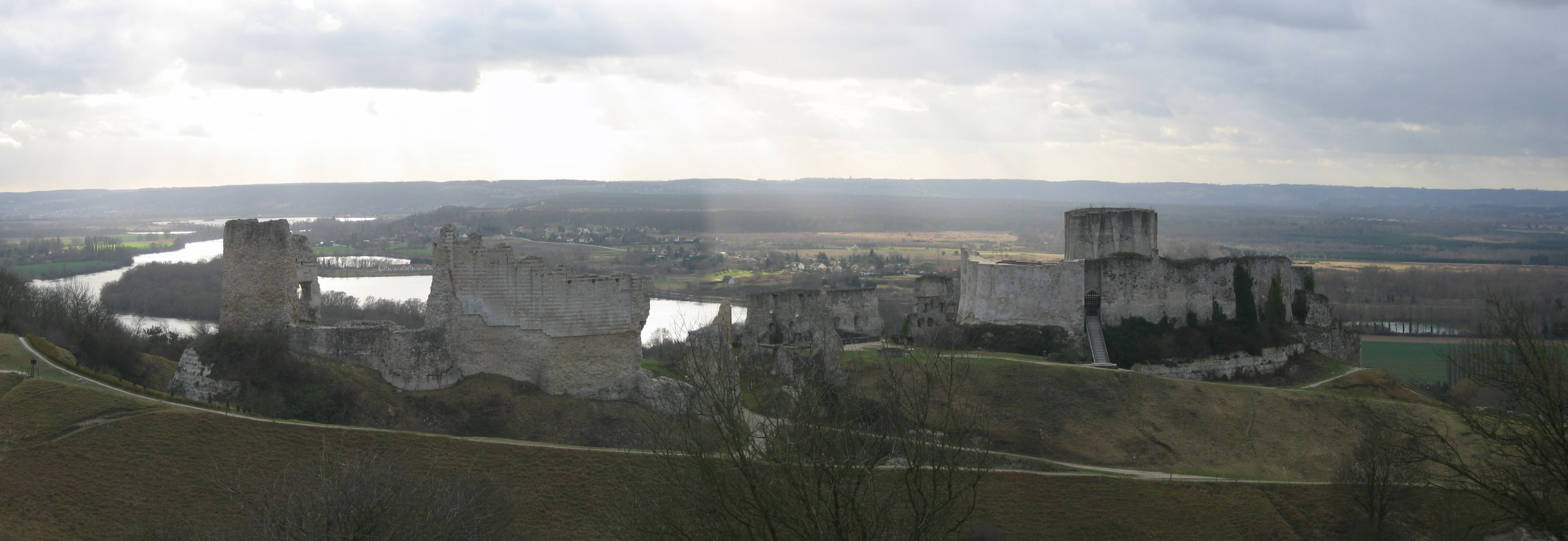
Ruins of Château-Gaillard in 2005.

=== The final campaign ===
Location of the Cotentin and Avranchin regions.

The final campaign for the conquest of Normandy began on 2 May 1204, with the conquests, in the space of a few days, of Pont-de-l'Arche, Roche-Orival, Le Neubourg, Moulineaux, and Montfort-sur-Risle. Having postponed the conquests of Rouen, Arques, and Verneuil, the King of France had Argentan delivered to him on May 7 by its defender, the Flemish Roger de Gouy. Falaise then fell after a swift seven-day siege, and Caen also fell with virtually no fighting. William Crassus, seneschal of Normandy, takes refuge in Rouen. Philip Augustus pursued him to lay siege to Rouen towards the end of May. At the same time, the Bretons, intent on avenging Arthur's death, attacked the Avranchin region to the west. Taking advantage of the favorable tide, they first conquered Mont-Saint-Michel by fire. They joined forces with the French armies at Caen, before conquering the rest of Avranchin and then Cotentin. (Note: The details of this conquest are unknown.)

The Channel Islands.

Rouen, under siege from the French, is ready for a long siege. Provisions from all over Normandy were plentiful enough to last a long time, and the last holdouts against the French occupation had taken refuge behind the city's high walls and triple moats. It was commanded by Peter de Préaux, assisted by the elite of the local barons. However, on 1 June 1204, the town signed an agreement with the French stipulating surrender in the event of failure or absence of rescue attempts within the following thirty days; this treaty also covered the towns of Arques and Verneuil, which had been invested but not taken by the royal troops. The fear that the town's commercial advantages would be lost if it resisted for too long was so strong that it preferred to surrender without a fight. On June 24, even before the deadline, the city gates were opened and French troops entered Rouen without any resistance from the population. Only Dieppe, too dependent on maritime relations with England, resisted the authority of the French king until 1207.

France's conquest of mainland Normandy was complete; however, the Channel Islands, belonging to the Duchy of Normandy, were not conquered, as the French king lacked the ships and his troops were too unfamiliar with naval matters to attempt anything against them. The kings of France subsequently claimed all the islands, but were unable to conquer them, as they remained under the control of the English crown.

== Integration into the french royal domain (1204–1315) ==
=== Treaty of Paris (1259) ===
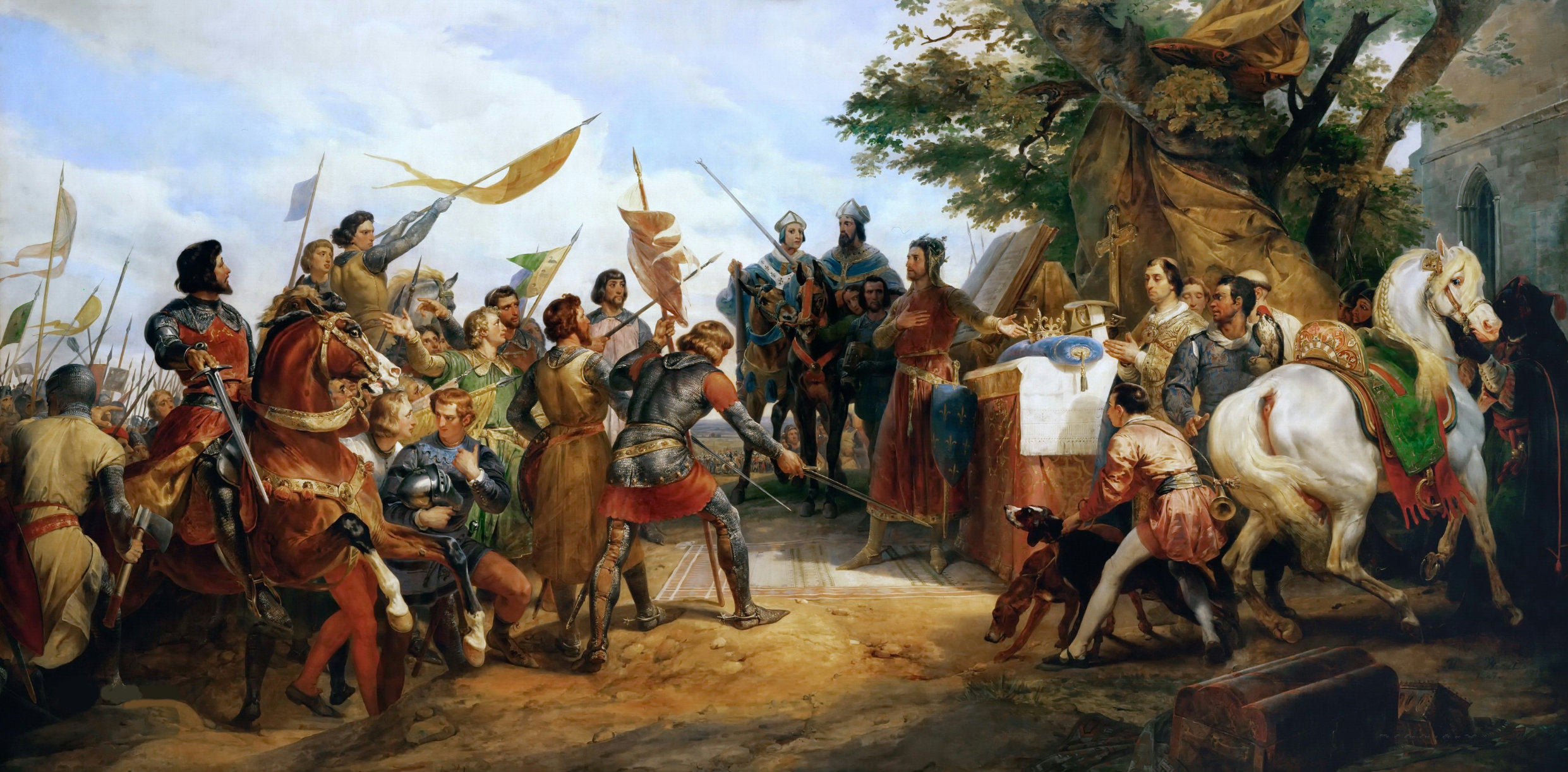
The Battle of Bouvines by Horace Vernet, 1827.

Normandy became part of the royal domain after the full conquest by French troops in 1204. However, few can say whether the wars against the English were over once and for all, or whether the English would soon seek to return to the land through arms or diplomacy, feudal customs being on the side of the King of England, since land confiscated by a suzerain from his vassal could be returned to him if the latter repented. However, Philip Augustus had no intention of returning Normandy. On several occasions, John Lackland attempted to reclaim his confiscated continental lands. In 1206, he laid siege to Thouars in Poitou. Despite his previous failures, in 1213-1214 he took part in the vast coalition formed against the King of France. This coalition included Emperor Otto IV, Renaud de Dammartin, Ferdinand of Flanders, Theobald I de Lorraine, Henri I of Brabant, William I de Holland and Philippe II of Courtenay-Namur. Despite the number of its members, the alliance suffered several defeats that broke it up, first John at La Rochelle on 2 July 1214 by Crown Prince Louis, then on 27 July 1214 at Bouvines.

After this defeat, John was attacked by Prince Louis, son and heir of Philip Augustus, who landed in England in May 1216 with the intention of seizing the English crown offered by the English barons in revolt against the King. John's death thwarted his plans, and he was forced to abandon them as the English rallied around the heir to the throne, Henry III. On the death of King Philip Augustus on 14 July 1223, the English king tried to intimidate the new King of France, Louis VIII, by protesting against Philip's conquests and calling on the nobles and burghers of Normandy to revolt and return to English obedience. The new King of France made it known that he had inherited these lands from his father, and that he could prove it if Henry III would come to his court.

From 1224 onwards, several sea battles took place, before the English king took advantage of the King of France's untimely death to force the Count of Brittany, Peter Mauclerc, into treason, before landing at Saint-Malo himself for a failed campaign when he had planned to reconquer all the lost lands. He signed a peace agreement until 1242, when he landed at Royan, only to be defeated again at Saintes. This was Henry III's last military attempt to reconquer the mainland. Henceforth, diplomacy would play a key role: although Louis IX was open to dialogue, he never recovered the lands. (Note: It is said that Saint Louis was in favor of giving the continental lands back to the English, but had to face opposition from the barons or the Queen.) In 1258, the King of France and the King of England signed the Treaty of Paris, which gave Henry III certain fiefs in the dioceses of Limoges, Cahors, and Périgueux, and recognized Guyenne. In exchange, Henry III officially renounced his lost lands, including Normandy (with exception for the islands), and declared himself vassal of the King of France for his continental lands. This treaty definitively confirmed the French conquest of Normandy.

=== Assimilation policy ===
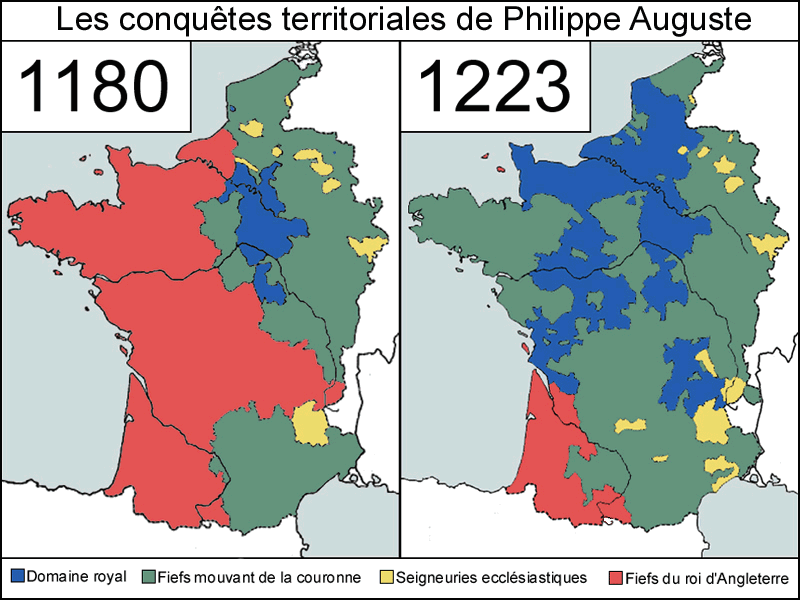

==== The nobility ====
The Normandy nobles were the most solicited following this annexation. They had to choose between two vassalage obligations, to the Duke, King of England, and to the Duke's suzerain, the King of France. This choice also involved opting between their continental lordships or their island possessions, as feudatories had been moving between their continental possessions and their island estates for over a century. In 1204, the Norman nobility consisted of some two thousand knights, including some sixty barons, ten of whom had the title of count (four had their earldom in Normandy, the rest in England or elsewhere in the kingdom). Normandy's feudal system was unusual in that it had very little hierarchy: few of the duke's vassals had vassals of their own, and the duke dominated the feudal system directly.

Philip Augustus forced the nobles of Normandy to choose between him and the King of England. The terms were clear: nobles who wanted to keep their Norman lands had to renounce their English lands and pay homage to him, renouncing all feudal ties with John Lackland. The deadline was one year from April 1205, and was extended to Christmas 1205; after this deadline, nobles who had not made their choice would lose their Norman lands. In feudal law, it is quite possible to pay homage to two kings for different lands, making the choice all the more complicated for the nobles of Normandy. There were only a few exceptions, notably William the Marshal, Earl of Pembroke, who owned several fiefs in Normandy. In May 1204, he concluded an agreement with Philip, temporarily handing over his Norman lands to the King of France. In exchange, he obtained a twelve-month delay and a large sum of money, and if after this period Normandy was conquered by the French, he would pay homage to the King of France. So, in 1205, he obtained John's authorization to go and pay homage to Philip, and was able to keep his lands on both sides of the Channel. Other rare exceptions include Robert de Fontenay, who owned the Norman fief of Fontenay-le-Marmion in addition to his English fiefdoms, Éléonore de Vitré, destined to become Countess of Salisbury, who kept her Norman domain until her death in 1233, and Alix, Countess of Eu. (Note: Saint Louis put an end to the few exceptions to double homage in 1244.)

Furious at the loss of Normandy, John again made the mistake of rushing to demand that his vassals be present at his side, on pain of forfeiture of their English lands. As early as 1204, he drew up a list of the nobles who had remained in Normandy and had their property seized. Some nobles, such as Robert IV Bertran, lost their English and Norman fiefs. For Anglo-Norman lords, the choice of fief was made without any link to either king: they kept the most important one, even if they were closer to the king they had to abandon. It is difficult to draw up a list of nobles who lost their Norman fiefs. If the rate of great barons preferring England was around 50%, the rate of the rest of the nobility preferring England was 5-10%, or around 200 nobles. The choices were difficult for most, as England represented a large part of their income. Some tried to outwit others, such as Alain Martell, who managed to exchange his English lands for the Norman lands of Elyas de Wimbleville. Others divided their lands, giving the Norman lands to one son and the English lands to the other, thus separating the families into two branches. Nevertheless, despite certain authorizations, most of these subtleties were forbidden, notably by the King of France. Until the reign of St. Louis, a rule was applied ordering the confiscation of Norman lands on the death of a lord if his closest heir was in England. This decision created inextricable legal situations around disputed inheritances: For example, in 1215, when Thomas de Lyon and William Cornat were brought before the Exchequer of Normandy over a piece of land they were disputing, the Exchequer concluded that the land should revert to Raoul Huigen, who had passed to England, and the land was confiscated by the King of France. But four years later, William Cornat proved that Raoul Huigen had died in England before 1191, and that he was his closest descendant, so the land was returned to him. Many descendants tried to prove, often falsely, that their ancestor had died before 1204. But this situation also created the conditions for abuse, as in the case of the lands of Bernard de Montpinchon's aunt, who died in Normandy and was unable to pass on her land to him because her husband had died in England.

==== The clergy ====
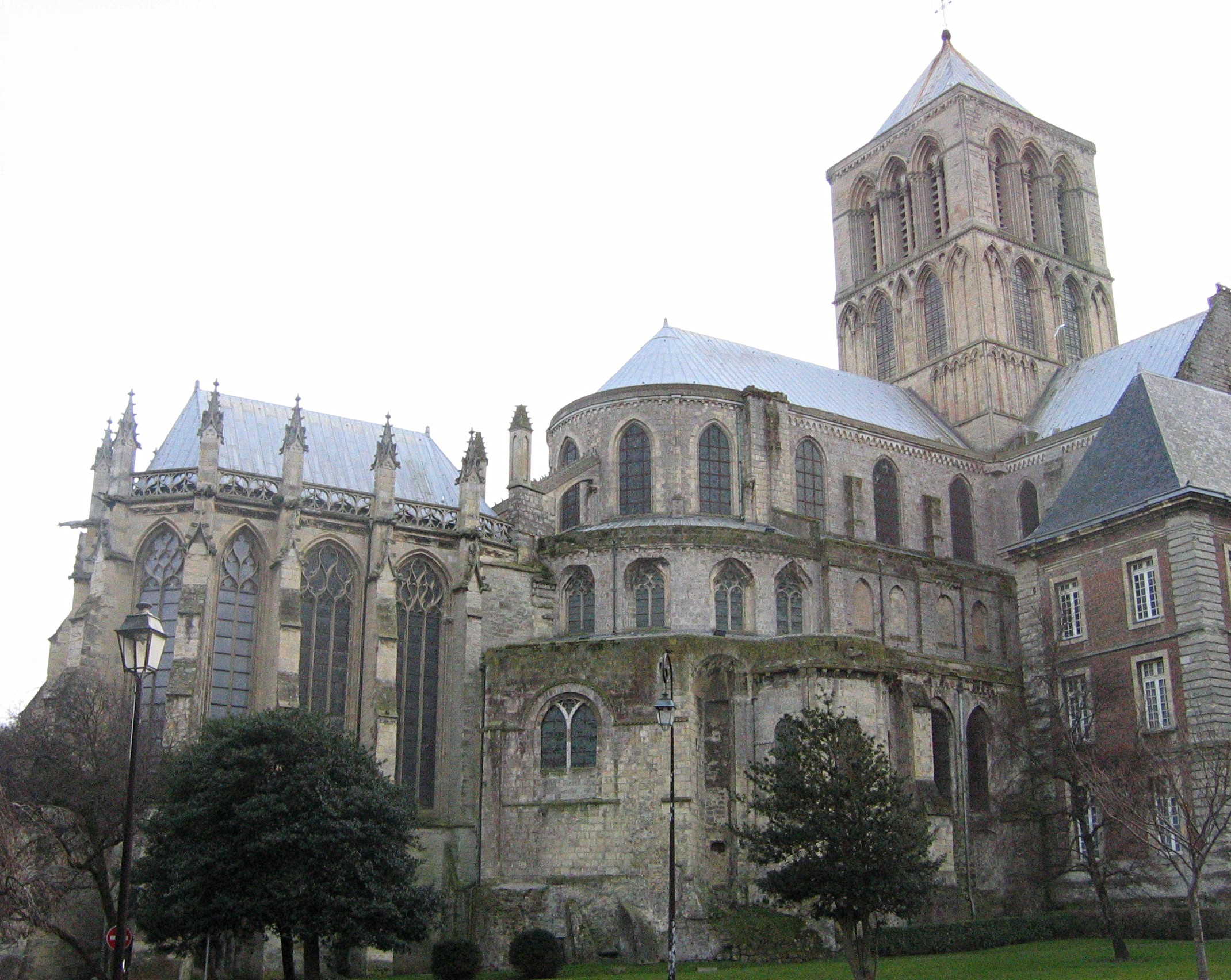
Abbey of the Trinité de Fécamp

Following the conquest of Normandy by the French, the clergy constituted an important political and moral force, essential to the success of the conquest. Having understood this, Philippe Auguste began in 1200 to attract the Norman clergy, an operation that quickly proved successful after the conquest.

Since the time of William the Conqueror, ducal power had agreed to the investiture of abbots and bishops. John Lackland used and abused this power before the Conquest, intervening directly in appointments and, above all, prolonging the vacancies of episcopal see to take better advantage of the Duke's right of regal. In contrast to John, Philip Augustus, as soon as a Norman land was conquered, implemented the same policy as in the kingdom of France, since Louis the Younger voluntarily relinquished his authority over the Church, to ensure its loyalty. In 1200, when the French annexed the Évrecin region, they announced new episcopal elections for the see of Évreux; an investigation revealed that the election of the incumbent, Garin de Cierrey, who was also close to John, had been distorted by the intervention of the English kings of the time, even though they had no right to do so. With the benevolence of Philip Augustus, Évreux was able to freely elect its bishop. After the total conquest of Normandy in 1204, the Norman bishops had to choose sides, a choice made all the more complicated by the fact that, according to Norman custom, they owed "faith and homage" to the Duke of Normandy. When approached, Pope Innocent III, a supporter of the King of England but who recognized Philip Augustus' superiority in arms, told them that he could not give an opinion, as he did not know the situation well. The bishops took this response as a rallying call to the King of France, and never again failed to respond. They soon proved their support by taking part with Philip Augustus, three of them, in the Albigensian Crusade in 1209. Then five out of seven attended Philippe Auguste's funeral in 1223.

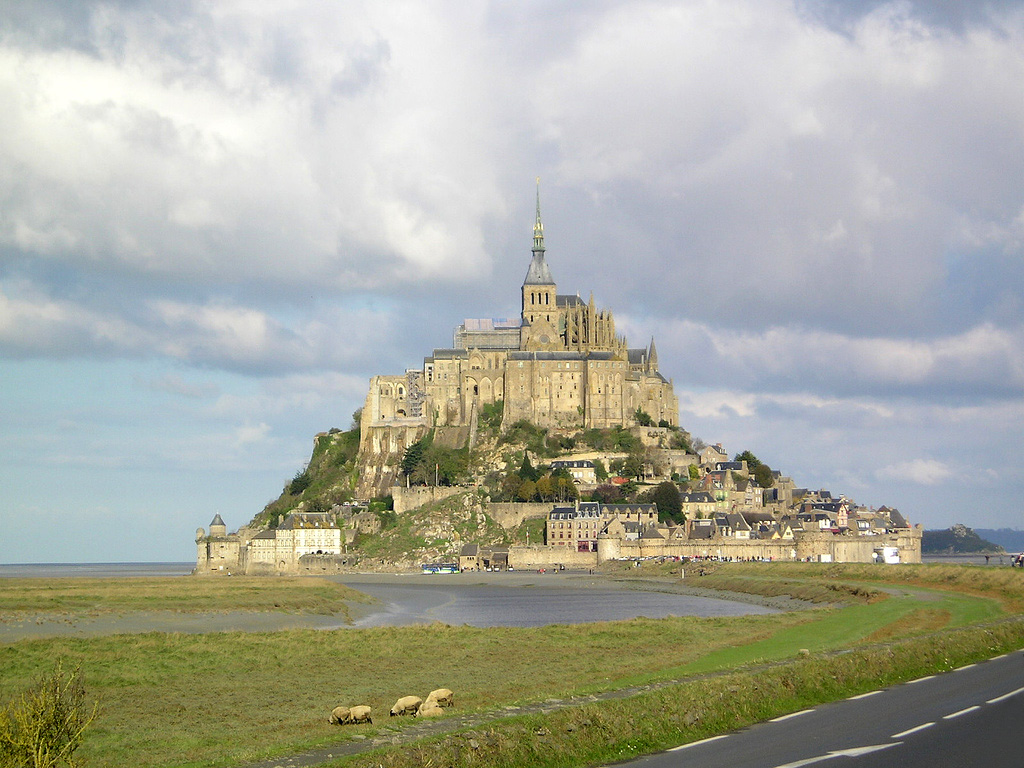
Mont-Saint-Michel Abbey

With this move, the Church of Normandy won not only the right to freely elect its bishops, but also an end to the interminable vacations between two episcopal elections. The monks of the abbeys were also soon granted the right to freely elect their abbot. With these concessions, Philip Augustus was able to exercise the traditional rights of the Dukes of Normandy, notably preventing the introduction of new tithes, removing the Church's right of control over wills, and preventing the excommunication of its officials. In addition, Philip Augustus introduced banishment for clerics convicted of crimes, and protected lay fiefs from ecclesiastical jurisdiction.

Unlike the nobility, Norman clerics were not forced to choose between their possessions in Normandy and England. Since 1066, Normandy, which possesses some of the most prestigious abbeys in the West, has had all its monasteries in England, and the Norman religious communities have made a good living from them. None of them had any interest in ending relations with England. Philip Augustus was well aware of this, and had no intention of clashing with the Norman clergy on this burning issue. Despite this privilege, the religious communities found it difficult to have their rights recognized. The abbot of Saint-Étienne-de-Caen was the first to conclude an agreement with England in 1205, followed shortly afterwards by the abbot of the Trinité de Fécamp, and until 1212, when the abbey of Mont-Saint-Michel had difficulty gaining recognition for its lands across the Channel, each religious community was able to recover its lands. Exploiting these revenues was a complicated business, however, and depended on the climate of relations between France and England. As soon as diplomatic tensions arose between the two countries, it became very difficult for clerics to travel from one country to the other. From the thirteenth century onwards, and especially during the fourteenth century, religious communities began selling off their possessions across the Channel, which had become less valuable to monastic communities since the Conquest.

==== The cities ====
As soon as the French arrived in the Normandy towns, the inhabitants quickly submitted to the conqueror. It's true that, apart from a few wealthy citizens, the population had no interest in preserving England. For his part, Philippe Auguste took several acts in favor of the towns as he advanced in 1204. In May of the same year, the town of Falaise was confirmed as a commune, and its mayor, André Propensée, was richly endowed with land that had probably been confiscated. In Caen and Rouen, the privileges of the bourgeois of both towns were confirmed. The commune of Verneuil was recognized and its mayor, Étienne le Petit, was granted land. In Breteuil, the commune's burghers were exempted from custom. Also in 1204, Philippe Auguste created three Norman communes at Les Andelys, Nonancourt, and Pont-Audemer. Until the end of his reign, Philippe Auguste granted numerous privileges to the Norman communes.

But the communes of Normandy were unique in the sense that they were born of the duke's own desire and will. This is in contrast to the rest of the kingdom, where towns were usually created as a result of a population's revolt against the lord. John Lackland himself imposed commune status on many towns in order to raise money. As a result, many of the communal charters imposed by the dukes were not confirmed by Philippe Auguste as early as 1204: Auffay, Alençon, Bayeux, Cherbourg, Domfront, Évreux, Fécamp, Harfleur, Montivilliers - it is even likely that some had not even formed their communal structures. Other communes, such as Falaise and two of Philippe Auguste's creations, Les Andelys and Nonancourt, were to disappear. However, some towns, such as the capital Rouen, Eu, Pont-Audemer, and Dieppe, were very active as communes, despite the fact that their communal status had been imposed by John Lackland shortly before the French conquest. These towns were governed by the Establishments of Rouen, which allowed the king to choose the mayor from a list of three names put forward by the commune's bourgeois. In this way, the King of France retained complete control over the government of the towns. In 1256, Louis IX imposed this system on all communes in the kingdom, even the smallest.

The upper middle classes who populated these communes readily accepted the new power, and the same families, indeed the same men, were at the head of the communes. In Rouen, Jean Luce, who had played a major role in the city before the French conquest, was appointed mayor three times between 1206 and 1218. A member of the Fessart family, from which some mayors were recruited during the ducal period, was again appointed mayor in 1221. During the first half of the thirteenth century, other families who had ruled the city before 1204 became mayors of Rouen. However, one city stood out and missed the Angevin Empire: Dieppe, whose citizens were in constant commercial contact with England, and which lost a great deal with the French conquest. One of the incidents between the French authorities and the Dieppois was the arrest of a fisherman, which led to a series of incidents that resulted in the French depriving the town of water until it paid the king a fine of four hundred pounds. Relations calmed down when John Lackland reversed his ban on all trade between French Normandy and England. Philip-Augustus let things slide, even when Dieppois burghers provided John with ships that enabled him to disembark in Poitou in 1206. In the following decades, the commercial advantages granted to the Normans in England were not called into question, and even in 1229, when Henri III suspended relations with Europe, certain Normans were the only ones authorized to trade. Henry III hoped to gain their support for a planned landing. Thus, in the spring of 1230, nine of the ships taking Henri III to Brittany came from Normandy, but it is also possible that the shipowners had been requisitioned against their will. The decade of 1230 was marked by a number of incidents, with Henri III now seeking to harm French merchants by any means necessary. Under the impetus of Louis IX, English sailors began to see Norman sailors as rivals rather than allies, and Norman sailors felt the same way. The Treaty of Paris in 1259 put an end to the privileges of Norman sailors, who henceforth traded with English ports not as compatriots, but as foreigners. In 1293, Norman sailors sank eighty-one English ships in the Franco-English war. This rapid francization is probably due to the outlets for Normandy merchants in the Paris region, encouraged by Philip Augustus from 1210 onwards. With these agreements, the inland towns of Normandy quickly rallied to France.

==== The administration ====
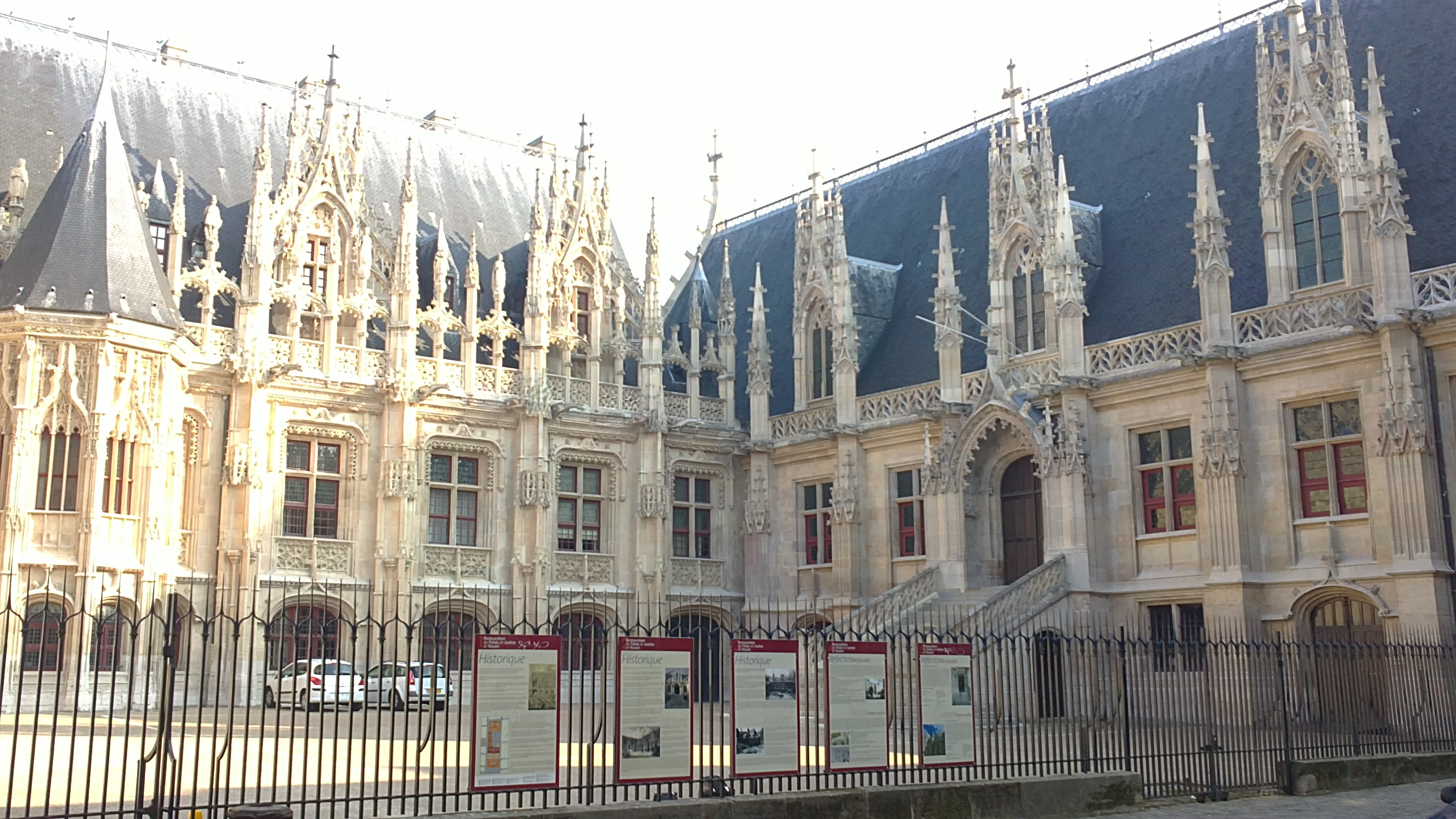
The Rouen Palais de Justice, the former Exchequer of Normandy.

Despite the conquest, the Duchy of Normandy continued to exist in both text and reality. The King of France called Normandy "his Duchy of Normandy", although he never bore the title of Duke of Normandy. (Note: Unlike English kings, who bear the title of King of England and Duke of Normandy.) There was no longer an enthronement ceremony specific to Normandy; the King of France automatically became Duke of Normandy at his coronation in Reims. Another change was the abolition of the Seneschal of Normandy, who since William the Conqueror had been responsible for governing the country in the Duke's absence, whether in England or abroad.

The unity of Normandy was undermined over the years by French sovereigns. Philippe Auguste gave Mortain and Domfront to the Count of Boulogne, but without making them independent counties of Normandy. Louis IX changed this policy by entrusting small counties to his sons, without reference to Normandy. Thus, the counties of Perche and Alençon were given to his son Pierre in March 1269; on the latter's death, they were returned to the crown, before being given back by Philippe le Bel to Charles de Valois in 1291. The same fate befell the county of Évreux and the seigneury of Beaumont-le-Roger, given to the king's brother Louis in 1298, and the county of Mortain to Philippe d'Évreux in 1318. Under Philippe Auguste, the idea was born of creating a buffer zone between Normandy and the Duchy of France. After the conquest, he brought together several Norman and French provostships to form a sort of Norman march.

Philippe Auguste maintained Norman law after the conquest for a number of reasons. Firstly, customary unity had not been achieved in France: there were several dozen different customs, each covering a small, limited territory, and the King of France had no idea which custom to impose. Secondly, Norman custom was more advantageous to the sovereign than any other custom in France, whether in feudal or criminal matters. He did, however, modify a few points to make the Normans equal to the French, notably with regard to dueling, by removing the appellant's privileged position. Throughout the thirteenth century, Norman custom was modified by royal ordinances, which applied throughout the kingdom of France, and therefore in Normandy, except where custom was deemed better.

In judicial matters, Philip Augustus maintained the Exchequer, a sovereign court symbolizing Normandy's independence. However, it underwent major changes: the presidency was now held by royal commissioners, and the king often appointed his closest advisors. These advisors, who came from Paris, were unfamiliar with Norman custom: as soon as a complicated case arose, they systematically referred it to the king. In total violation of Norman custom, several Norman cases were brought before the Paris parliament. Royal agents were also sent by Philip Augustus to fill the posts of bailiffs already instituted by the King of England from 1190 onwards. Within the kingdom of France, bailiffs were senior civil servants, appointed and paid by the king, whom they represented in matters of administration, justice, and summoning the army. They are the superiors of other royal agents in Normandy, such as viscounts and sergeants. Geographically, until 1230, the bailliages were shifting districts that did not exist in the texts. They were referred to by the name of the bailli rather than the region or town they administered. Subsequently, geographical bailliages appeared, representing a town or region. Until 1243, Normandy's baillis were all foreigners to the duchy, but most made efforts to integrate by receiving or buying property in Normandy and donating to Norman churches for burial. Later, Norman bailiffs were appointed, although they were still in the minority compared with foreign bailiffs. On the other hand, viscounts, provosts and sergeants, important royal officials, were mostly Norman. Many of the Norman lands confiscated from nobles who had preferred England were kept as crown property and entrusted to an administration. Other lands were given to nobles of the royal domain, mostly to minor nobles who thus became agents of French assimilation. The kings of France also encouraged marriages between Norman and Île-de-France nobles.

=== The Charte aux Normands ===
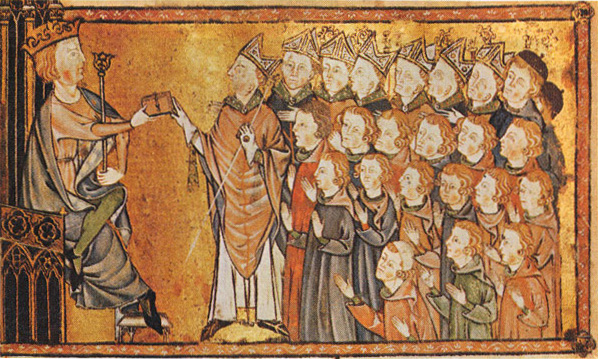
The granting of the Charte aux Normands. Miniature from a 14th-century manuscript of the Grand Coutumier de Normandie. Petit Palais, Dutuit collection.

At the end of the thirteenth century, revolts broke out in Normandy, as royal power called into question privileges concerning justice and taxation. In judicial matters, the Normans had long been dissatisfied with the fact that the Exchequer was presided over by foreigners from Normandy. Moreover, from the end of the 13th century, the punctuality of the Exchequer's sessions disappeared and, in some years, it did not meet at all. As a result, legal cases dragged on in Normandy. In 1302, Philip the Fair took steps to ensure that the Exchequer met twice a year and stopped moving around to different towns, settling permanently in Rouen. Another source of discontent was that Normans were judged in Paris, both at first instance and on appeal, despite the sovereignty of the Exchequer.

In terms of taxation, Philip the Bold and Philip the Fair increased the contributions of money from Normandy to finance the war with Aragon and business in Flanders. While they used the prerogatives of the former dukes, they added a new reason for financial contribution: "the defense of the kingdom". For the Normans, these new levies were contrary to custom, and in 1292 a riot broke out in Rouen, with the receivers' house demolished by the angry mob, and the servants of the King of France besieged in the castle. It took the mayor's intervention to calm the Rouennais' anger and prevent the demonstration from becoming anti-French. Under Philip the Fair, the anger of the Normans increased from year to year, as did taxes, especially as the king's chamberlain Enguerrand de Marigny, who was the absolute controller of the kingdom's finances, came from the lower nobility of Normandy. Other Normans held important financial positions with the King of France.

In the final months of Philip the Fair's reign, an unprecedented anti-tax crisis broke out throughout the kingdom. It all began in 1314, when a new tax was levied to finance an expedition to Flanders that ended without a single battle. Public opinion could not understand how so much money had been levied for such a result. Enguerrand de Marigny was accused of treason by public opinion, especially as the levying of taxes for Flanders continued after the peace. When Philip the Fair died in 1314, his successor Louis the Quarrelsome inherited a complicated situation. In March 1315, a few months after his coronation, the King of France, to appease his subjects, granted provincial charters to the provinces of the Kingdom of France. The first of these was for Normandy, adopted after negotiations with the Normans.

The first of the provincial charters, the Normandy Charter was also the only one not to fall into oblivion after a few years. It contained texts that satisfied all Normans, from the burghers of the towns to the nobles and the poorest Normans. It limited the king's rights in Normandy in a number of specific areas, including fiscal, military, and judicial matters. Some of its articles (three, four, seventeen, twenty-one, and twenty-two) practically acted as a Norman constitution, making it a document without equivalent in France. Articles three and four, which concern military matters, stipulate that vassals owed the king no more than the forty days provided for by feudal custom, towns had to provide their contingent of sergeants and no more, and Normans owed no more than their service. Furthermore, the king could no longer claim anything from his rear-vassals. Articles seventeen and twenty-one concerned judicial matters, finally granting the Exchequer the judicial autonomy the Normans had been demanding. The Parlement de Paris no longer acted as a court of appeal, and Normans could no longer be tried outside the province. Article twenty-two concerns taxation, and guarantees the Normans that the King will not be able to collect more than he normally collects from the Normans, except in cases of "great necessity" recognized by the representatives of the Norman orders. The Charte aux Normans remained in force until the French Revolution and was constantly confirmed by the various kings of France, although they respected it less and less.

=== Later survival of the duchy ===
The Duchy of Normandy survived mainly by the intermittent installation of a duke. In practice, the King of France sometimes gave that portion of his kingdom to a close member of his family, who then did homage to the king. In 1332 Philip VI made Jean, his eldest son and heir to his throne, the Duke of Normandy. In turn, Jean II appointed his heir, Charles.

In 1465, Louis XI was forced by the League of the Public Weal to cede the duchy to his eighteen-year-old brother, Charles de Valois. This concession was a problem for the king since Charles was the puppet of the king's enemies. Normandy could thus serve as a basis for rebellion against the royal power. In 1469, therefore, Louis XI convinced his brother under duress to exchange Normandy for the Duchy of Guyenne (Aquitaine). Finally, at the request of the cowed Estates of Normandy and to signify that the duchy would not be ceded again, at a session of the Norman Exchequer on 9 November 1469 the ducal ring was placed on an anvil and smashed. Philippe de Commynes expressed what was probably a common Norman thought of the time: "It has always seemed good to the Normans and still does that their great duchy really should require a duke" (A tousjours bien semblé aux Normands et faict encores que si grand duchié comme la leur requiert bien un duc).

Dauphin Louis Charles, the second son of Louis XVI, was again given the nominal title of 'Duke of Normandy' before the death of his elder brother in 1789.

== See also ==
- History of Normandy
- Province of Normandy

== Bibliography ==
=== Books ===
In English

- Contamine, Philippe (January 1994). "Chapter 16: The Norman "Nation" and the French "Nation" in the Fourteenth and Fifteenth Centuries". In Bates, David; Curry, Anne (eds.). England and Normandy in the Middle Ages (Proceedings of the conference held at the University of Reading in September 1992). Vol. 1 (1st ed.). Londres and Rio Grande: The Hambledon Press. pp. 215–234. ISBN 1-85285-083-3. OCLC 299458007.

In French

- ^{(fr)} Philippe Mousket, Cartulaire normand.
- ^{(fr)} Achille Deville, Histoire du Château-Gaillard : et du siège qu'il soutint contre Philippe-Auguste, Rouen, Édouard frère, 1829 (read online archive)
- ^{(fr)} Adolphe Chéruel, Histoire de Rouen pendant l'époque communale, t. I, Rouen, Nécitas Périaux, 1843, 529 p.
- ^{(fr)} Léopold Delisle, Catalogue des actes de Philippe-Auguste, Paris, Auguste Durand, 1856, 784 p. (read online archive)
- ^{(fr)} Léopold Delisle, Recueil des jugements de l'Échiquier de Normandie au treizième siècle, Paris, Imprimerie impériale, 1864, 298 p. (read online archive)
- ^{(fr)} Achille Luchaire, Louis VI le Gros, annales de sa vie et de son règne (1081-1137), Alphonse Picard, 1890, 395 pp.
- ^{(fr)} Charles Petit-Dutaillis, Étude sur la vie et le règne de Louis VIII, Paris, Librairie Émile Bouillon, 1894, 626 p.
- ^{(fr)} Alfred Coville, Les États de Normandie, leurs origines et leur développement au xive siècle, Paris, Imprimerie nationale, 1894.
- ^{(fr)} Michel Gavrilovitch, Étude sur le traité de Paris de 1259, Paris, Librairie Émile Bouillon, 1899, 178 p.
- ^{(fr)} Achille Luchaire, Louis VII, Philippe-Auguste, Louis VIII (1137-1226), t. III/1, Paris, Ernest Lavisse, coll. "Histoire de France depuis les origines jusqu'à la Révolution", 1901, 416 p.
- ^{(fr)} Léopold Delisle, Querimoniae Normannorum, t. XXIV, Paris, Imprimerie nationale, coll. "Recueil des historiens des Gaules et de la France", 1904 (read online archive)
- ^{(fr)} Charles Petit-Dutaillis, Le Déshéritement de Jean sans Terre et le meurtre d'Arthur de Bretagne, Paris, Félix Alcan, 1923, 435 p.
- ^{(fr)} Michel Nortier, Le rattachement de la Normandie à la couronne de France, 1951
- Sir Maurice Powicke, The Loss of Normandy, 1189–1204. Studies in the History of the Angevin Empire, Manchester, University Press, 1961
- ^{(fr)} Marcel Pacaut, Louis VII et son royaume, S.E.V.P.E.N. Impr. nationale, 1964
- ^{(fr)} Roger Jouet, ...et la Normandie devint française, Poitiers, Mazarine, January 1983, 261 p. (ISBN 2-86374-102-0)
- John W. Baldwin, Philip Augustus and the Norman Church, Duke University Press, 1969
- ^{(fr)} François Louis Ganshof, Qu'est-ce que la féodalité, Saint-Estève, Librairie Jules Tallandier, February 1998, 296 p. (ISBN 2-235-01299-X)
- ^{(fr)} Jean Favier, Les Plantagenêt : Origines et destin d'un empire xie - xive siècles, Poitiers, Fayard, September 2004, 960 p. (ISBN 2-213-62136-5, read online archive)
- ^{(fr)} Jacqueline Monsigny, L'Extraordinaire histoire de la Normandie, Courtry, Éditions Alphée, May 2010, 355 p. (ISBN 978-2-7538-0591-0)
- ^{(fr)} Claude Gauvard, La France au Moyen Âge : Du ve au xve siècle, Mercuès, Presses universitaires de France, March 2012, 570 p. (ISBN 978-2-13-058230-4)
- ^{(fr)} Maïté Billoré, De gré ou de force : L'aristocratie normande et ses ducs (1150-1259), Rennes, Presses universitaires de Rennes, coll. "Histoire ", 2014, 448 p. (ISBN 978-2-7535-3328-8, online presentation archive)
- ^{(fr)} Daniel Power, Anne Curry and Véronique Gazeau, La guerre en Normandie (XIe-XVe siècle): La chute de la Normandie ducale (1202-1204) un réexamen, Caen, Presses universitaires de Caen, 2020, 366 p. (ISBN 978-2-38185-009-2, presentation online archive, read online archive).

=== Articles ===
- ^{(fr)} Anne Vallez, "La Construction du comté d'Alençon", Annales de Normandie, 1972 (read online archive)
- J. F. A. Mason, "William (1103-1120)", Oxford Dictionary of National Biography, 2004 (read online archive)
- Elizabeth Hallam, "Henry (1155-1183)", Oxford Dictionary of National Biography, May 2006 (read online archive)
