= History of Normandy =

The coat of arms of Normandy

Normandy was a duchy in the North-West of what later became France under the Ancien Régime which lasted until the later part of the 18th century. Initially populated by Celtic tribes in the West and Belgic tribes in the North East, it was conquered in AD 98 by the Romans and integrated into the province of Gallia Lugdunensis by Augustus. In the 4th century, Gratian divided the province into the civitates that constitute the historical borders. After the fall of Rome in the 5th century, the Franks became the dominant ethnic group in the area and built several monasteries. Towards the end of the 9th century, Viking raids devastated the region, prompting the establishment of the Duchy of Normandy in 911. After 150 years of expansion, the borders of Normandy reached relative stability. These old borders roughly correspond to the present borders of Lower Normandy, Upper Normandy and the Channel Islands.

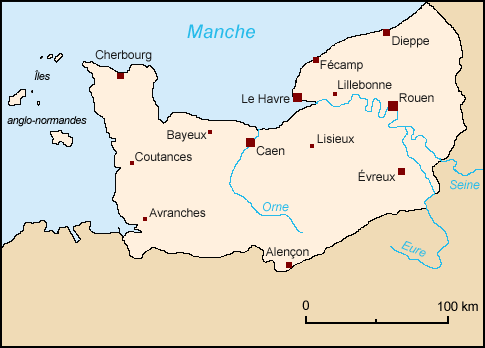
The historical limits of Normandy

Mainland Normandy was integrated into the Kingdom of France in 1204. The region was badly damaged during the Hundred Years' War and the Wars of Religion, the Normans having more converts to Protestantism than other peoples of France. In the 20th century, D-Day, the 1944 Allied invasion of Western Europe, started in Normandy. In 1956, mainland Normandy was separated into two regions, Lower Normandy and Upper Normandy, which were reunified in 2016.

== Prehistory and antiquity ==
=== Prehistory ===
Human presence in the region does not date back earlier than the end of the Lower Paleolithic (before that, this region was extremely cold). In the Middle Paleolithic, it is attested by numerous finds of lithic industry. But, in the Upper Paleolithic, the region was occupied by tundra, which was not very favorable to human life.

However, it would be inhabited again especially in Eure and Calvados, as shown by the Orival and Gouy Cave near Rouen, which, due to its cave paintings dated to the Magdalenian, with Gouy being the northernmost decorated cave in Europe. Several still-visible megaliths can be found scattered quite regularly throughout the Norman countryside, most of them built in a uniform style.

The Rozel Archaeological Site presents exceptional traces of footprints and handprints of Homo neanderthalensis.

=== Celtic Normandy ===
Normandy began to be developed in the Bronze Age (2300 - 800 BC) with a network of farms, field systems and vast necropolises covering the whole of the area of Normandy.

More is known about Celtic Normandy due to the archeological sources being more numerous and easier to date. In the 19th century, local scholars studied archeological sites (especially those of Upper Normandy) and recorded their discoveries. They discovered objects such as the Gallic gilded helmet of Amfreville-sous-les-Monts, made in the 4th century BC, and the iron helmet currently in the Museum of Louviers. They also examined the cemetery at Pîtres (Eure), with its urns for cremated remains, coiled swords and traces of chariot tombs. These discoveries as well as sites such as Ifs (Calvados) indicate a Celtic presence in Normandy dating from the end of the Hallstatt period or the beginning of the La Tène period.

The Celtic peoples of present-day Normandy were part of Armorica, a confederation of culturally close peoples along the shores of the English Channel and the Atlantic Ocean, from the Seine estuary to that of the Loire.

Belgae and Celts, known as Gauls, invaded Normandy in successive waves from the 4th to the 3rd centuries BC.

Much of our knowledge about this group comes from Julius Caesar's de Bello Gallico from his invasion of Gaul (58–50 BC). Caesar identified nine different Celtic tribes among the Belgae who occupied separate regions and lived in enclosed agrarian towns. In 57 BC, the Gauls united under Vercingetorix in an attempt to resist the onslaught of Caesar's army. Even after their defeat at Alesia, the people of Normandy continued to fight until 51 BC, the year Caesar completed his conquest of Gaul.

The testimony of Julius Caesar (in the Gallic Wars) allows us to identify the different Gallic groups occupying the region. In 56 or 57 BC, these populations gathered to resist the invasion of the Roman legions. After the Gallic defeat at the siege of Alesia, the peoples of Normandy continued the struggle for some time, but by 51 BC, all of Gaul was subdued by Rome.

Below is a list of Gallic tribes, whose territories correspond to later Normandy, and their administrative centers:

- Abrincates (Ingena, modern-day Avranches),
- Aulerci Eburovices (Mediolanum, modern-day Evreux),
- Baiocasses (Augustodurum, modern-day Bayeux),
- Calates (Juliobona > modern-day Lillebonne),
- Esuvii (*Uxisama > modern-day Exmes)
- Lexovii (Noviomagus Lexoviorum, modern-day Lisieux),
- Sagii (unknown name, modern-day Sées)
- Unelli (Cosedia, modern-day Coutances),
- Veliocasses (Rotomagus > modern-day Rouen),
- Viducasses (Aragenuae, modern-day Vieux).

=== Roman Normandy ===
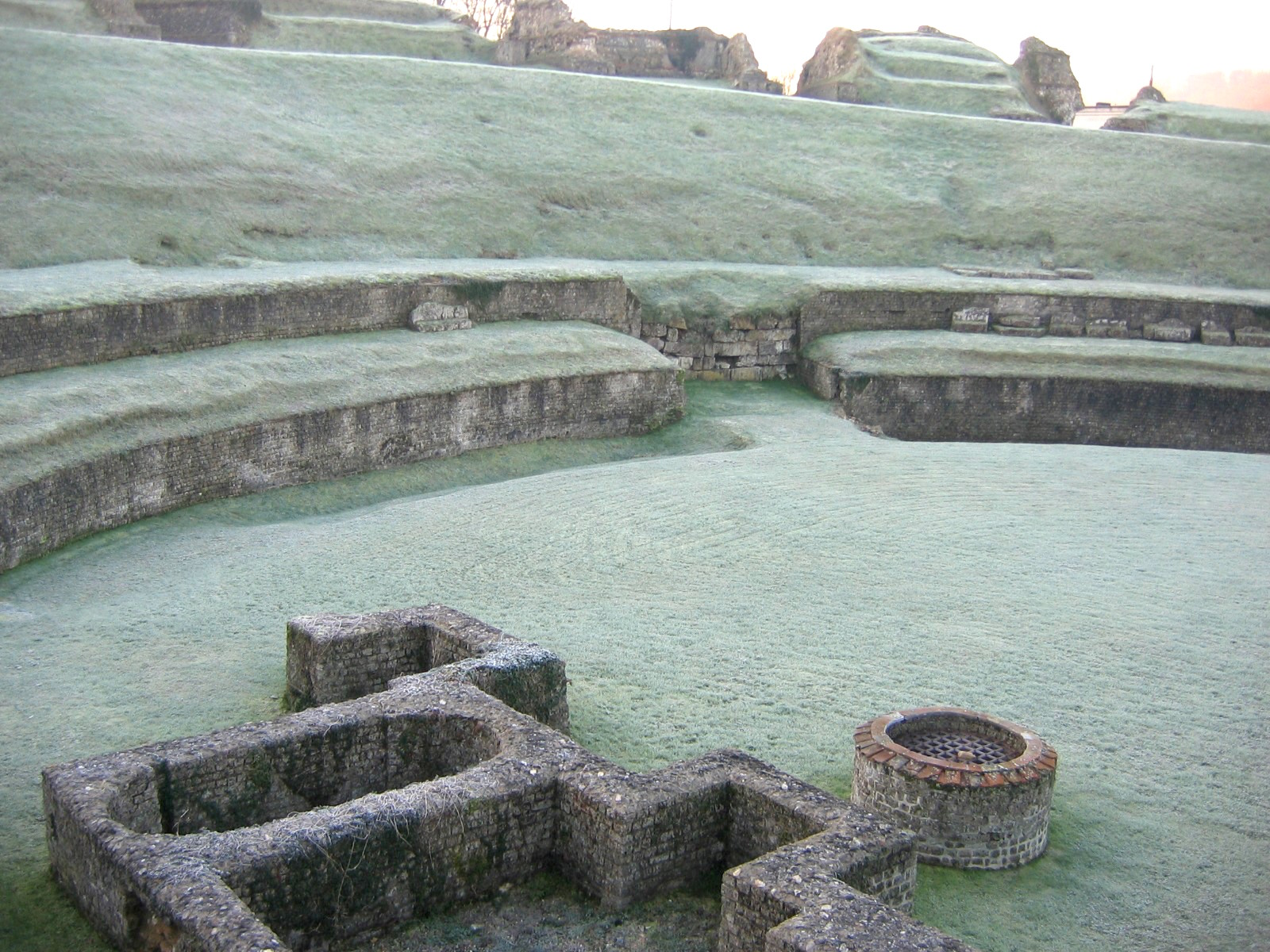
Roman theatre in Lillebonne

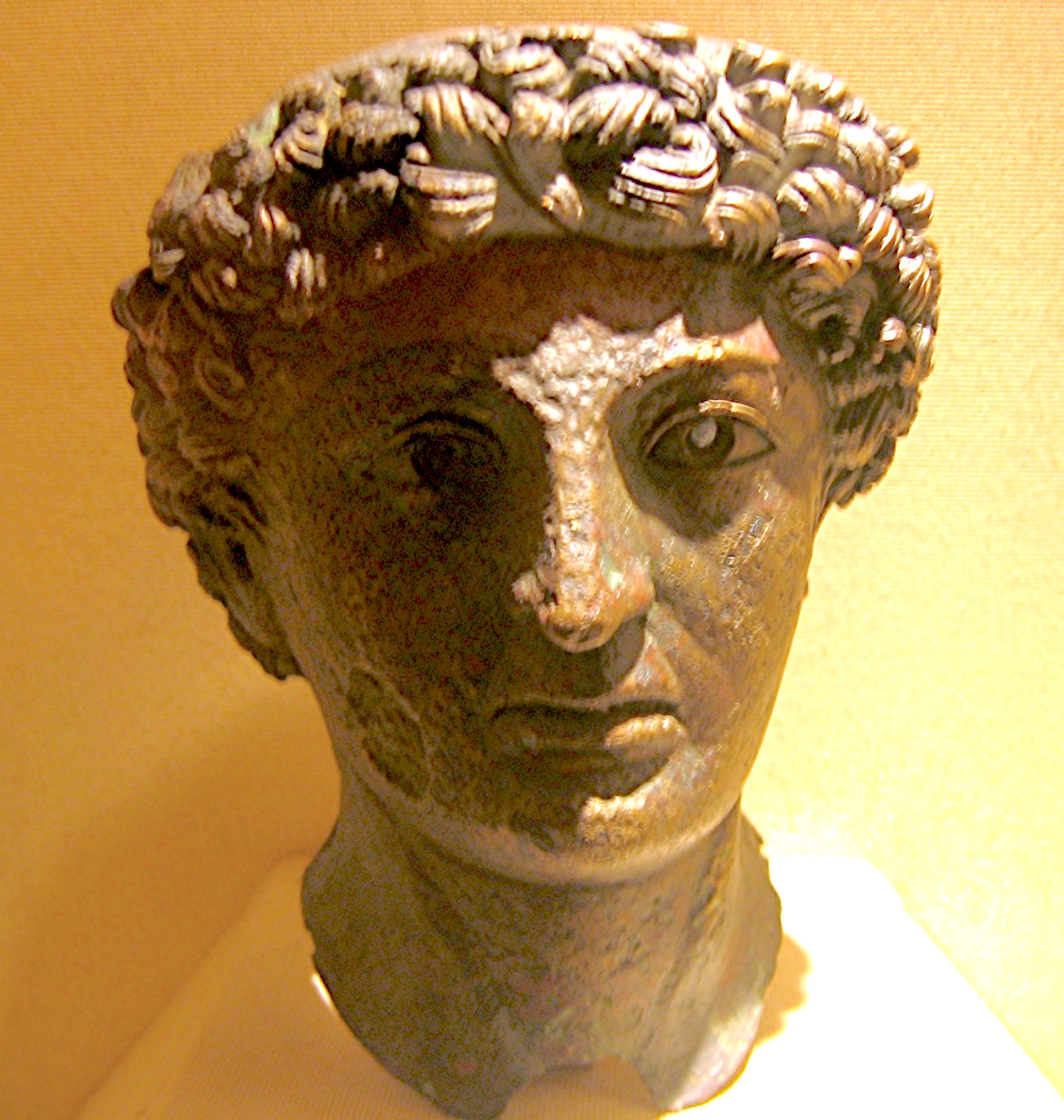
The bronze head of a Roman god, found in Lillebonne, in the Museum of Antiquities in Seine-Maritime

Between 27 BC and 15 BC, Emperor Augustus reorganized the Gallic territories moved the Caletes and Veliocasses into the province of Gallia Lugdunensis, which had its capital at Lyon. The Romanisation of Normandy partly included in the Gallia Celtica and in the Gallia Belgica (the Seine being more or less the limit between them) was achieved by the usual methods: Roman roads and a policy of urbanisation.

Classicists mention many Gallo-Roman villas and archeology found their traces in the past 30 years, thanks in large part to finds made during construction of the A29 autoroute in Seine-Maritime. These country houses were often laid out according to two major plans. One design features a tall and slender structure with an open façade facing south; the second design is similar to Italian villas, with an organized layout around a square courtyard. The latter can be seen at the villa of Sainte-Marguerite-sur-Mer. The villas were built using local materials: flint, chalk, limestone, brick, cob and wattle and daub. The technique of half-timbering came from this period and Celtic huts. Heating of baths or certain rooms used the Roman hypocaust system, such as the suburban villa at Vieux-la-Romaine.

Agriculture in the region provided wheat and flax for linen, according to Pliny the Elder. Pliny also noted the presence of many fana - small Celtic temples with a centered, usually square plan. One example is located west of Harfleur. In antiquity the temples of Vieil-Évreux made the town one of the most important pilgrimage centers in Europe, with a forum, Roman baths, a monumental basilica, two fana, and the second largest theater in Gaul. Excavations have also revealed many terracotta statuettes of mother goddess statues in many tombs and houses in the regions, particularly Évreux.

=== Crises in the 3rd century and the Roman loss of Normandy ===
In the late 3rd century, barbarian raids devastated the province. Traces of fire and hastily buried treasures bear evidence to the degree of insecurity in Northern Gaul. Coastal settlements risked raids by Saxon pirates and became depopulated. The province became part of the system of coastal defences known as Saxon Shore on both sides of the English Channel.

The situation was so severe that the Romans recruited Germans into their armies to fight the barbarians. An entire legion of Sueves was garrisoned at Constantia (in the pagus Constantinus), the administrative center of the Unelli tribe. Batavi were garrisoned at Civitas Baiocasensis (Bayeux ).

During the reforms of Emperor Diocletian (285–305), the future Normandy became distinct by forming the Lugdunensis Secunda, whose borders foreshadowed the Archdiocese of Rouen and those of ducal Normandy seven centuries later: it stretched from the Couesnon to the Bresle and was bounded to the south by the upper courses of the Sarthe and the Avre. The only significant difference was that Lyonnaise Secunda included the future Vexin français, with the land of the Veliocasses then remaining undivided, and these immigrants were granted permission to settle in the Empire.

In 406 Germanic and Alan tribes began invading from the east. Toponymy suggests that the various barbarian groups had installed themselves and formed alliances and federations already at the end of the 3rd century, well before the fall of the Western Roman Empire in 476.

Christianity began to enter the area: Saint Mellonius was supposedly ordained Bishop of Rouen in the mid-3rd century. Rouen already having a metropolitan bishop by the 4th century with an ecclesiastical province based on the Roman province of Lugdunensis Secunda, and in turn correspondeding closely to the future duchy of Normandy. Christianity.

Eventually in 457, Aegidius established the Domain of Soissons in the area (with its seat the town of the same name Soissons, formerly the seat of the Suessiones), independent of and cut off from the Empire but with citizens nevertheless still considering themselves Roman. His son Syagrius succeeded him in 464 and remained until the kingdom was conquered in 486. Rural villages were abandoned and the remaining "Romans" confined themselves to within urban fortifications.

== Middle Ages ==
=== Frankish Normandy ===
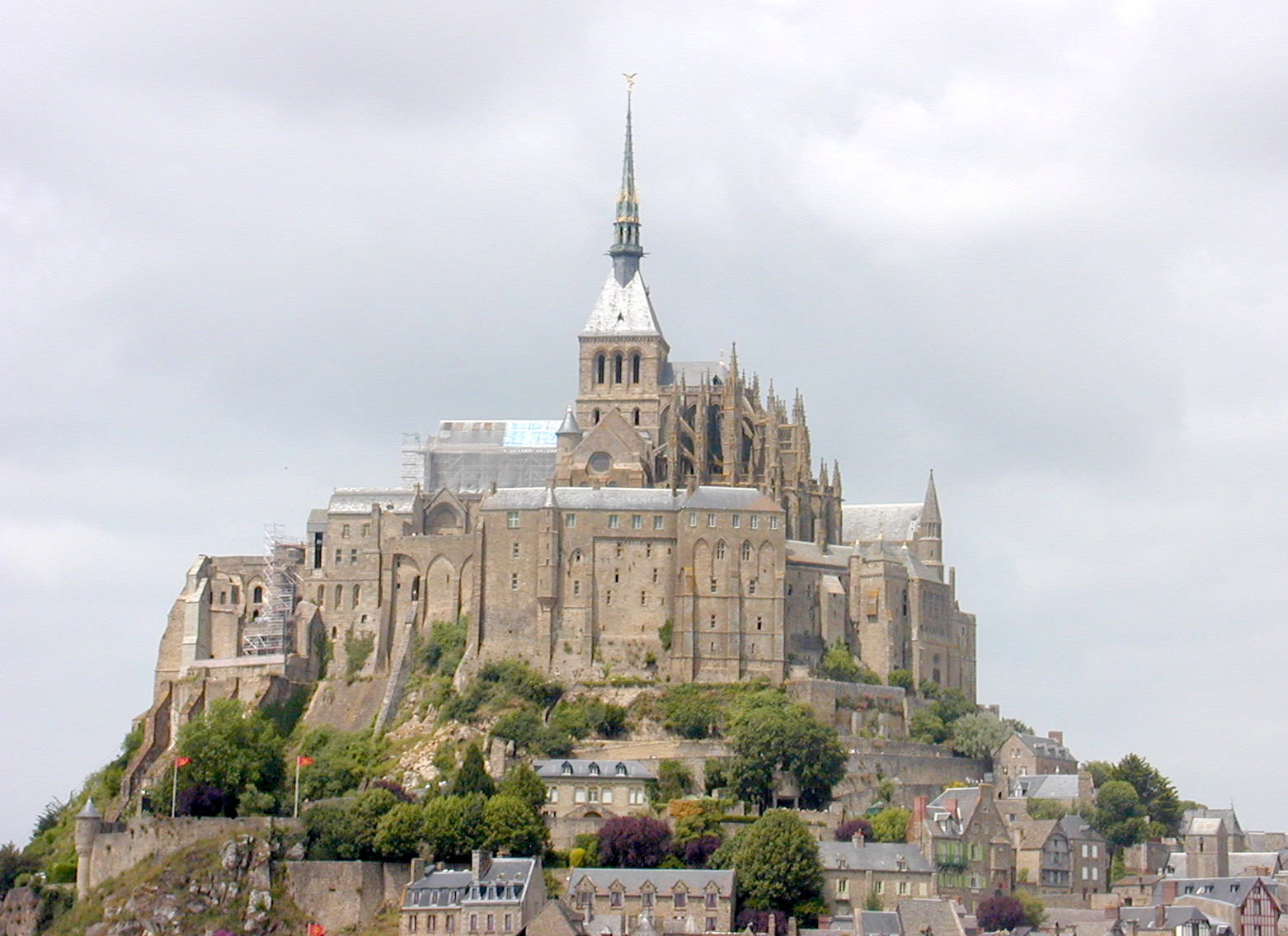
Mont-Saint-Michel

The Franks defeated the culturally Roman Kingdom of Soissons in the Battle of Soissons in 486. By that time the area between the Somme and the Loire had come under the control of the Frankish lord Clovis. Frankish colonization did not occur on a massive scale, and is evidenced chiefly by cemeteries in Envermeu, Londinieres, Herouvillette, and Douvrend. The place names were chiefly Frankish at this time. The Franks also cut administration and military presence at the local levels. Large rural estates, episcopal sees such as Rouen, and fiscal centres marked Frankish authority. The Capitulary legislation and royal courts extended Frankish law and institutions into the area, though local aristocracies maintained significant autonomy.

The Christianization of the area continued with the construction of cathedrals in the principal cities and churches in minor localities. This establishment of the parishes would continue for a long time. The smaller parishes tended to be located in the plains around Caen while the rural parishes took up more space. Villagers would be buried around the local parish church up until the Carolingian era.

The Neustrian monarchy developed in the 6th century in the isolated western regions. In the 7th century the Neustrian aristocrats founded several abbeys in the valley of the Seine: Fontenelle in 649, Jumièges about 654, Pavilly, Montivilliers. These abbeys rapidly adopted the Benedictine Rule. They came to possess great quantities of land throughout France, from which they drew considerable income. They therefore became involved in political and dynastic rivalries.

By the sixth and seventh centuries the whole region was integrated into the Merovingian and later Carolingian realms. Eventually the eastern region of Normandy became a residence for Merovingian royalty.

By the ninth century, Carolingian kings such as Charlemagne and Louis the Pious maintained river defenses and fleets, but the weakening of central power after 840 created vulnerabilities. Political divisions between the heirs of Louis the Pious, as codified in the Treaty of Verdun (843), fractured the Frankish kingdom and left the Seine valley especially exposed to external attack.

=== Scandinavian invasions ===
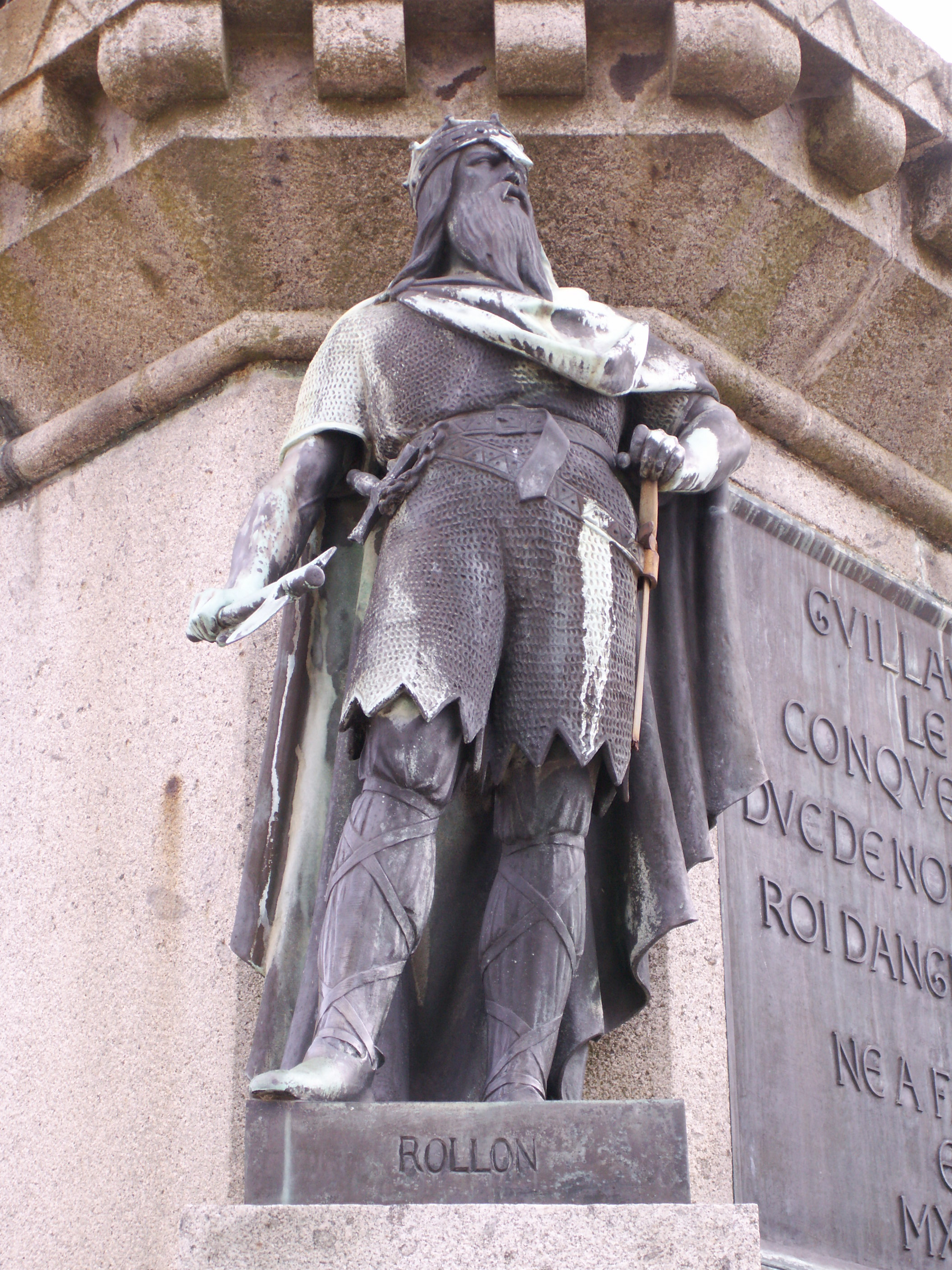
Statue of Rollo

Normandy takes its name from Nortmanni, "men of the North", the Viking invaders who menaced large parts of Europe towards the end of the first millennium in two phases (790–930, then 980–1030).

Several coastal areas were lost during the reign of Louis the Pious (814–840), and the Seine was the main route by which they entered the Kingdom of France. The incursions down the Seine in 841 caused severe damage to Rouen. Monasteries were particularly targeted with it being probable that there were no monasteries left in the region by the time Rollo became duke. An expedition in 845 went up the Seine and reached Paris. The raids took place primarily in the summers, with the Vikings initially wintering in Scandinavia.

The Carolingian kings in power at the time tended to have contradictory politics, which had severe consequences. In 867, Charles the Bald signed the Treaty of Compiègne, by which he agreed to yield the Cotentin Peninsula (and probably the Avranchin) to the Breton king Salomon, on condition that Salomon would take an oath of fidelity and fight as an ally against the Vikings. After being defeated by the Franks at the Battle of Chartres in 911, the Viking leader Rollo signed the Treaty of Saint-Clair-sur-Epte, under which Charles the Simple ceded the area of present-day Upper Normandy which Rollo had previously conquered, with Rollo pledging vassalage to Charles, vowing to guard the estuaries of the Seine from further Viking attacks and accepting baptism.

With a series of conquests, the territory that would become the Duchy of Normandy gradually expanded: Hiémois and Bessin were taken in 924, the Cotentin and a part of Avranchin followed in 933. That year, King Raoul of France was forced to give Cotentin and a part of Avranchin to William I of Normandy, essentially all lands north of the river Sélune which the Breton dukes had theoretically controlled for about the previous 70 years. Between 1009 and 1020, the Normans continued their westward expansion, taking all the land between the rivers Sélune and Couesnon, including Mont Saint-Michel, and completing the conquest of Avranchin. William the Conqueror completed these campaigns in 1050 by taking Passais. Logically, the Norman rulers (first counts of Rouen and then dukes of Normandy) tried to bring about the political unification of the two different Viking settlements of pays de Caux-lower Seine in the east and Cotentin in the west. Furthermore, Rollo re-established the archbishopric of Rouen and wanted to restore the traditional limits of his archbishopric in the west, that had always included Cotentin and Avranchin.

While Viking raiders pillaged, burned, or destroyed many buildings, it is likely that ecclesiastical sources give an unfairly negative picture: no city was completely destroyed. On the other hand, many monasteries were pillaged and all the abbeys were destroyed. Nevertheless, the activities of Rollo and his successors brought about a rapid recovery.

The Scandinavian colonisation was principally Danish under the Norwegian leadership of Rollo, the colonization also had a Norwegian element in the Cotentin region. For instance, the first name Barno is mentioned in two different documents before 1066 and clearly represents the "frankization" of the Old Scandinavian personal name Barni, only found in Denmark and in England during the Viking Age. It can be identified in many Norman place-names too, such as Barneville-sur-Seine, Banneville, etc. and in England: Barnby. On the other hand, the presence of Norwegians has left traces in the Cotentin:

- indirectly: there are toponyms created with typical Celtic anthroponyms from Ireland or Scotland, which are reputed to have been occupied by Norwegian Vikings, for instance: Doncanville (Duncan) or Digulleville (Dicuil cf. Digulstonga, Iceland)
- directly: the coastal route from the Orkney Islands down to the Cotentin peninsula is marked by rocks and cliffs with typical Norwegian names.

A few Swedes may have also come to Normandy.

The Viking colonisation was not a mass phenomenon. Nevertheless, in some areas, the Scandinavians established themselves rather densely, particularly in pays de Caux and in the northern part of the Cotentin. In fact, one can qualify the Nordic settlements in Normandy as Anglo-Scandinavian, because most of the colonists must have come after 911 as fishermen and farmers from the English Danelaw and a consequent Anglo-Saxon influence can be detected. Toponymic and linguistic evidence survives in support of this theory: for instance Dénestanville (Dunestanvilla in 1142, PN Dunstān > Dunstan) or Vénestanville (Wenestanvillam 13th century, Wynstān > Winston). Furthermore, the Anglo-Saxon Chronicle mentions three times the possible settlement of Danes from England in Neustria:

1. A Danish army stationed in Kent for three years finally broke up, and while some Danes stayed in England, others who owned ships sailed over the Channel to the Seine River.
2. Later, it is told that the jarl Thurcytel (Thorketill cf. NPN Turquetil, Teurquetil), who first settled in the English Midlands, sailed to Francia in 920.
3. Around 1000 another Viking fleet left England for Normandy.

Archeological evidence can be added: some Anglo-Saxon swords were dredged out of the Seine River, they had probably been used by the Danes. More recently, a buried treasure hoard discovered at Saint-Pierre-des-Fleurs contained nine Anglo-Saxon coins with traces of blows to test the metal quality of the coins.

The merging of the Scandinavian and native elements contributed to the creation of one of the most powerful feudal states of Western Europe. The naval ability of the Normans would allow them to conquer England and to participate in the Crusades.

=== Ducal Normandy (10th to 13th centuries) ===
Rollo was a Viking chief who led Danish settlement in the Rouen region around the year 900 and after an agreement with the King of France in 911 he became count of Rouen. His successors from Richard II gained the title Duke of Normandy. Although the dukes were vassals of the King of France and paid homage to each new monarch; they were practically independent, striking their own money, rendering justice, levying taxes, raising their own armies and naming the bulk of prelates within the archdiocese of Rouen.

In 924, King Radulf extended Rollo's county westward up to the river Vire, including the Bessin, where some Danes from England had settled not long before. Rollo's son and successor, William Longsword, extended the domain, with Radulf granting the formerly Breton Avranchin and the heavily Norse Cotentin to Longsword in 933. These expansions brought the boundaries of Normandy roughly in line with those of the ecclesiastical province of Rouen.

Longsword came into conflict with Arnulf of Flanders, who had him assassinated in 942. This led to a crisis in Normandy, with a minor succeeding as Richard I, and also led to a temporary revival of Norse paganism in Normandy. Richard I's son, Richard II, was the first to be styled duke of Normandy, the ducal title becoming established between 987 and 1006.

In 980, the dukes helped place Hugh Capet on the French throne. In 1066, Duke William defeated Harold II of England at the Battle of Hastings and was subsequently crowned King of England, through the Norman conquest of England. Anglo-Norman and French relations became complicated after the Norman Conquest. The Norman dukes retained control of their holdings in Normandy as vassals owing fealty to the King of France, but they were his equals as kings of England. Serfdom was outlawed around 1100.

From 1154 until 1214, with the creation of the Angevin Empire, the Angevin kings of England controlled half of France and all of England, dwarfing the power of the French king, yet the Angevins were still de jure French vassals.

In 1204, during the reign of John, King of England, mainland Normandy was captured from the English by the forces of Philip II of France, ending some 293 years of relative Norman independence from the French crown. Insular Normandy (the Channel Islands) remained under control of the English, though still attached to the ecclesiastical province of Rouen. In the 1259 Treaty of Paris, Henry III of England recognized the legitimacy of the French possession of mainland Normandy.

=== Later Middle Ages ===
Despite Henry ceding Normandy to France his successors, however, often fought to regain control of their ancient fiefdom. Having little confidence in the loyalty of the Normans, Philip installed French administrators and built a powerful fortress, the Château de Rouen, as a symbol of royal power. However Norman law continued to serve as the basis for court decisions and in 1315 the Norman Charter was promulgated which protected against arbitrary royal acts and new taxes without Norman consent while confirming the Exchequer of Normandy as the final court rather than Paris - although the charter was whittled away by successive kings as they became more powerful.

The Duchy of Normandy survived mainly by the intermittent installation of a duke. In practice, the King of France sometimes gave that portion of his kingdom to a close member of his family, who then did homage to the king. Philippe VI made Jean, his eldest son and heir to his throne, the Duke of Normandy. In turn, Jean II appointed his heir, Charles, who was also known by his title of Dauphin.

Normandy was devastated by various civil wars and the Hundred Years' War. Between 1419 and 1450, the English controlled all of Normandy apart from Mont-Saint-Michel, and made Rouen the seat of their power in France. Normandy ultimately saw its population decline by three quarters as a result of the various conflicts which took place in the region during the late Middle Ages.

In 1465, Louis XI was forced by his nobles to cede the duchy to his eighteen-year-old brother Charles, as an appanage. This concession was a problem for the king since Charles was the puppet of the king's enemies. Normandy could thus serve as a basis for rebellion against the royal power. Louis XI therefore agreed with his brother to exchange Normandy for the Duchy of Guyenne (Aquitaine). Finally, to signify that Normandy would not be ceded again, on 9 November 1469 the ducal ring was placed on an anvil and smashed. This was the definitive end of the duchy on the continent.

Prosperity returned to Normandy until the Wars of Religion. When many Norman towns (Alençon, Rouen, Caen, Coutances, Bayeux) joined the Protestant Reformation, battles ensued throughout the province. In the Channel Islands, a period of Calvinism following the Reformation was suppressed when Anglicanism was imposed following the Stuart Restoration.

==== Exploration ====
Normandy provided a number of pioneers in exploring the Atlantic. The 14th-century explorer Jean de Béthencourt established a kingdom in the Canary Islands in 1404. He received the title King of the Canary Islands from Pope Innocent VII but recognized Henry III of Castile as his overlord, who had provided him with military and financial aid during the conquest.

Samuel de Champlain left the port of Honfleur in 1604 and founded Acadia. Four years later, he founded the City of Québec. From then onwards, Normans engaged in a policy of expansion in North America. They continued the exploration of the New World: René-Robert Cavelier de La Salle travelled in the area of the Great Lakes, then on the Mississippi River. Pierre Le Moyne d'Iberville and his brother Lemoyne de Bienville founded Louisiana, Biloxi, Mobile and New Orleans. Territories located between Québec and the Mississippi Delta were opened up to establish Canada and Louisiana. Colonists from Normandy were among the most active in New France, comprising Acadia, Canada, and Louisiana.

Honfleur and Le Havre were two of the principal slave trade ports of France.

== Modern history ==
=== 18th and 19th centuries ===
Although agriculture remained important, industries such as weaving, metallurgy, sugar refining, ceramics, and shipbuilding were introduced and developed.

In the 1780s, the economic crisis and the crisis of the Ancien Régime struck Normandy as well as other parts of the nation, leading to the French Revolution. Bad harvests, technical progress and the effects of the Eden Agreement signed in 1786 affected employment and the economy of the province. Normans laboured under a heavy fiscal burden.

Dauphin Louis Charles, the second son of Louis XVI, was again given the nominal title of 'Duke of Normandy' before the death of his elder brother in 1789.

In 1790, the five departments of Normandy replaced the former province and the Duchy was eventually extinguished as a legal entity in France.

11 July 1793, the Norman Charlotte Corday assassinated Jean-Paul Marat.

The Normans reacted little to the many political upheavals that characterised the 19th century. Overall, they warily accepted the changes of régime (First French Empire, Bourbon Restoration, July Monarchy, French Second Republic, Second French Empire, French Third Republic).

Following the French Revolutionary Wars and the Napoleonic Wars (1792–1815), there was an economic revival that included the mechanization of textile manufacturing and the introduction of the first trains.

Also, with seaside tourism in the 19th century came the advent of the first beach resorts.

=== Second World War ===
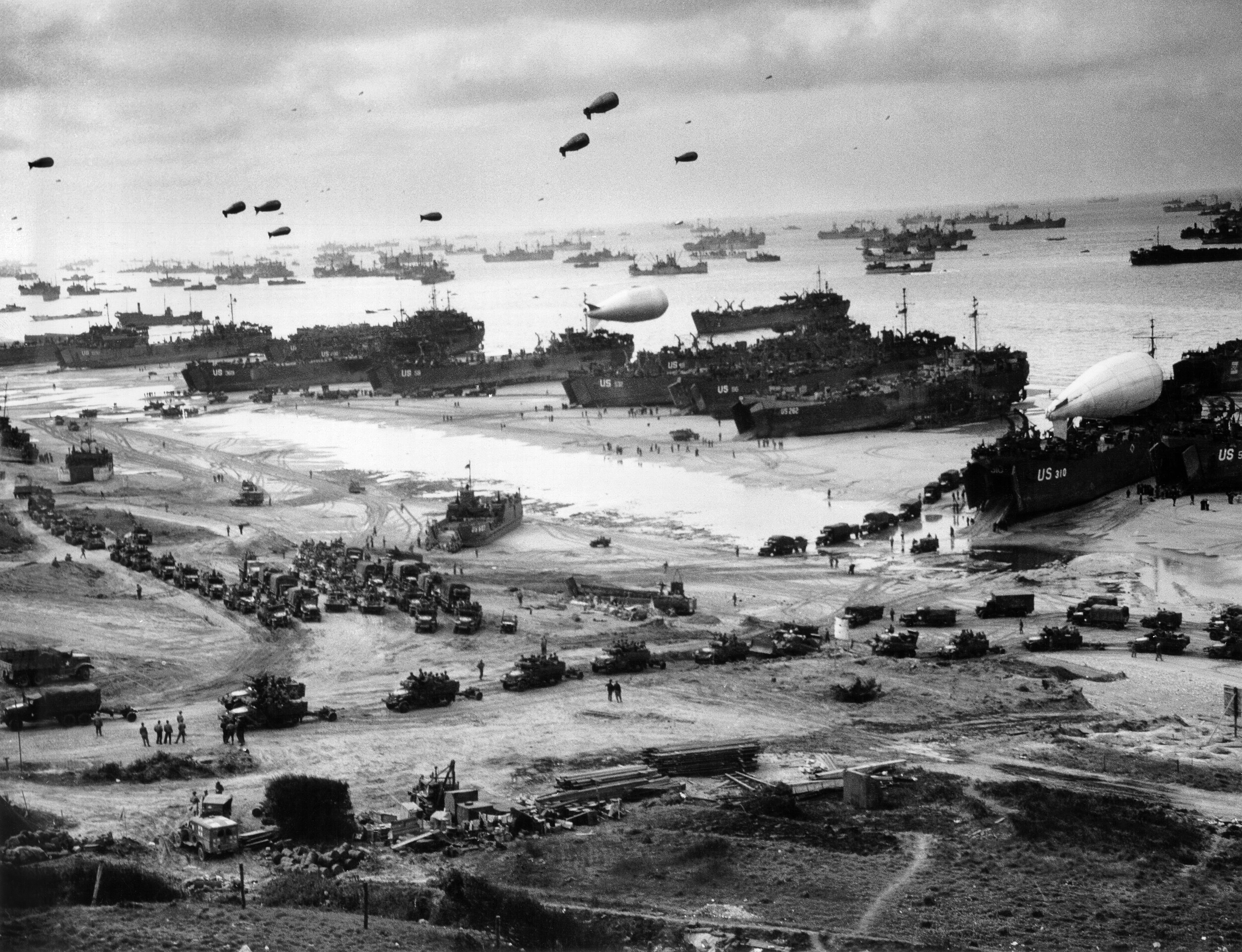
Allied invasion of Normandy, D-Day, 1944

During the Second World War, following the armistice of 22 June 1940, continental Normandy was part of the German occupied zone of France. The Channel Islands were occupied by German forces between 30 June 1940 and 9 May 1945. The town of Dieppe was the site of the unsuccessful Dieppe Raid by Canadian and British armed forces.

The Allies in this case involving Britain, the U.S., and Canada coordinated a massive build-up of troops and supplies to support a large-scale invasion of Normandy in the D-Day landings on 6 June 1944 under the code name Operation Overlord. The Germans were dug into fortified emplacements above the beaches. Caen, Cherbourg, Carentan, Falaise and other Norman towns endured many casualties in the Battle of Normandy, which continued until the closing of the so-called Falaise gap between Chambois and Mont Ormel. The liberation of Le Havre followed.

This was a significant turning point in the war and led to the restoration of the French Republic. The remainder of Normandy was liberated only on 9 May 1945 at the end of the war, when the Occupation of the Channel Islands effectively ended.

Despite the English renunciation of any claim to Normandy and the extinction of the duchy itself in modern-day, republican France, in the Channel Islands the monarch of the United Kingdom (whether a king or queen) is regardless still sometimes informally referred to by the title "Duke of Normandy".

== See also ==
- Archaeological Garden of the Hospital of Lisieux
- Æthelred the Unready
- Danegeld
- Great Lillebonne mosaic
- History of Lower Normandy
- Integration of Normandy into the royal domain of the Kingdom of France
- Province of Normandy
- Timeline of Caen
- Timeline of Le Havre
- Timeline of Rouen
- Votive Column of Lisieux

== Sources ==
- Douglas, David C. (May 1964). William the Conqueror: The Norman Impact Upon England.
- Hjardar, Kim (2016). "The Frankish Empire and France". Vikings at War (1st ed.). Havertown, PA: Casemate Publishers. pp. 296–335. ISBN 9781612004549.
