= Charter to the Normans =

Document issued by the King of France in 1315

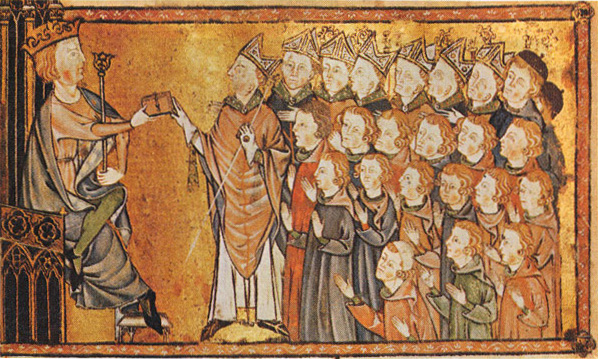
Granting of the Norman Charter

The Charter to the Normans, or Norman Charter, is a document granting certain rights or privileges to the Normans, issued on 19 March 1315, by the King of France, Louis X, who, in response to the impatient Norman barons, confirmed all its terms in July 1315.

To appease the Normans' periodic revolts, the king had to recognize the specificity of Normandy, and this charter, along with the second one from 1339, echoing Magna Carta or the Charter of Liberties of the English, would be considered until 1789 as the symbol of Norman particularism.

== Context ==
In 1314, Philip the Fair imposed a new tax to finance an expedition to bring Flanders back under French rule. This new contribution, deemed disproportionate given the stakes, would trigger a wave of protests throughout the kingdom. Philip the Fair's successor, his son Louis X, granted a series of provincial charters to calm the spirits. The Charter to the Normans was the first among them. It would be followed by: two charters to the people of Languedoc on 1 April 1315 and January 1316; the charter to the Bretons in March 1315; two charters to the Burgundians in April 1315 and 17 May 1315; two charters to the Champenois in May 1315 and March 1316; the charter to the Auvergnats in September 1315, reproduced for all the Lower Marches – namely, Poitou, Touraine, Anjou, Maine, Saintonge, and Angoumois —; the charter to the people of Berry in March 1316; and the charter to the people of Nivernais in May 1316.

== Versions ==
Three versions of the Charter to the Normans appear in the collection of the Ordonnances des rois de France. Two are dated 19 March 1315: one consists of fourteen articles in Latin; the other consists of twenty-four articles in French. The third consists of twenty-four articles in Latin and is dated from Vincennes, July 1315.

== Content ==
This charter, which was to play a fundamental role in the collective consciousness and imagination of the Normans, ascended to the status of myth to become the very symbol of Norman protest, even as it was regularly violated and, over the centuries, Normans forgot its content altogether. It provided the province with guarantees in legal, fiscal, and judicial matters and will be regularly brandished during times of crisis, particularly when it came to opposing Norman's specificity to royal centralism. Rarely turned against the power itself, protest was more likely to be directed against its manifestations.

The charter of 1315, and then that of 1339, guaranteed them the right to never be summoned before a jurisdiction other than that of their province. When a royal ordinance violated any provision thereof, the express reservation added to it recalled the existence of this right, even when it was infringed upon: Notwithstanding the clameur de haro and the Norman charter.

The first two articles of the charter concern monetary issues. Since the 11th century, all Normans paid the "monnéage" to the duke, a direct tax of twelve deniers per household every three years. In return, the duke waived his right to change the currency. Article 2 relates to the hearth tax. It specifies that it will be collected under custom, meaning for a fixed amount of twelve denarius per household, with numerous exemptions that the king now undertakes to respect.

Articles 3 and 4 concern military issues. Article 4 deals with the "ost." The king renounced demanding more from his vassals than the service they owe according to custom, which is forty days.

Articles 5 and 6 concern private property. Article 13 deals with the right of shipwreck; Article 20, with feudal and lineal withdrawals.

Article 9 concerns third parties and danger, a double right owed to the king on the harvest and sale of wood from his domain; it excludes deadwood – meaning lower quality green wood: willow, blackthorn, thorns, brambles, elder, alder, broom, juniper, and blackberry – as well as trees felled by the storm.

Article 15 limits the use of torture.

Article 16 regulates lawyers remuneration.

Article 18 recognizes the Normans' right to be judged in Normandy, according to Norman custom, and ultimately before the Exchequer; it regains its status as a French ancien parliament, with its judgments no longer subject to appeal before the Parlement of Paris.

Article 22 concerns the taxation issue. It recognizes the king's right to collect customary aids, first documented in 1190 and known in the 13th century as the "three feudal aids," the "three capital aids," or the "three aids of Normandy." The king renounces the levying of new taxes "except in cases of great necessity."

== Aftermath ==
The Charter to the Normans (Charte aux Normands) was confirmed by King Philippe VI of France in 1339 and then by his son, Duke Jean de Normandy. King Charles V the Wise did not confirm the charter, unlike his son and successor, King Charles VI, who confirmed it on 25 January 1381. During the Hundred Years’ War, King Henri V of England confirmed the charter in 1419, and then Duke Jean de Bedford, regent of the Kingdom of France, did it on behalf of King Henri VI of England on 16 November 1423.

The charter, granted at a time when royal authority was faltering, was violated several times thereafter when the monarchy had regained its power.

At the end of the Hundred Years' War, the King of France, Charles VII the Victorious, takes possession of Normandy. In early October 1449, he arrived at Pont-de-l’Arche. The city of Rouen sent a delegation led by Archbishop Raoul Roussel to negotiate the terms of its surrender. The king undertook to maintain the privileges of the Church of Rouen and those of the city, as well as to confirm the Charter to the Normans and the rest of Norman customary law. However, the king delayed in keeping his promise, and on 25 June 1451, Rouen sent a new delegation to Tours to meet with him and obtain the charter confirmation. The king ordered a meeting of commissioners in Vernon on 1 August 1451. In the fall of 1452, the estates of Normandy requested confirmation of the charter. Finally, the king confirmed it only in April 1458. His son and successor, King Louis XI the Prudent, confirmed it on 4 January 1462, at the request of the estates of Normandy. During the Estates-General of Tours in 1484, the charter is barely mentioned, but the son and successor of Louis XI, King Charles VIII the Affable, confirmed it on 27 April 1485. The charter was then confirmed by Louis XII on 30 September and 2 October 1508; by Francis I in 1517; by Henry II in 1550; and finally, by Henry III in April 1579. Long respected, this charter ceased to be in force at the end of the sixteenth century and was only truly abolished under Louis XIV, but continued to appear in the ordinances and privileges of the king until 1789.

== Archives ==
The original of the charter has not been reached. Its oldest known copy is preserved in the departmental archives of Calvados in the collection of the Abbey Saint-Martin de Troarn.

== See also ==
=== Bibliography ===
- Artonne, André (1912). Le mouvement de 1314 et les chartes provinciales de 1315. Bibliothèque de la Faculté des lettres de l'université de Paris (in French). Vol. 1 (1st ed.). Paris: F. Alcan. OCLC 4083038.
  - Langlois, Charles-Victor (April 1912). "Le mouvement de 1314 et les chartes provinciales de 1315, par André Artonne". Journal des savants. 4th series (in French). 10th year (4): 167–175. Archived from the original on 22 April 2022.
  - Viard, Jules (1912). "Le mouvement de 1314 et les chartes provinciales de 1315, par André Artonne". Bibliothèque de l'École des chartes (in French). 73: 325.
- Bougy, Catherine (2007). Poirey, Sophie (ed.). Images de la contestation du pouvoir dans le monde normand (xe – xviiie siècle) (Proceedings of the symposium organized by the University Office of Norman Studies at the University of Caen – Lower Normandy, held at the International Cultural Center of Cerisy-la-Salle from 29 September to 3 October 2004). Colloques de Cerisy (in French). Vol. 1 (1st ed.). Caen: Presses universitaires de Caen. doi:10.4000/books.puc.10257. ISBN 978-2-84133-272-4. OCLC 470924014. Archived from the original on 1 December 2023.
  - Poiret, Sophie (2007). "II.A.1. La Charte aux Normands, instrument d'une contestation juridique". op. cit., II (Contestations normandes des pouvoirs français et anglais (xiiie – xvie siècle)), II. A (Les Normands contre l'intégration au domaine royal). Symposia (in French). Presses universitaires de Caen. pp. 89–106. ISBN 978-2-84133-811-5. OCLC 7013347607.
  - Weidenfeld, Katia (2007). "II.A.3. Le privilège de juridiction des Normands aux xive et xve siècles : entre affirmation politique et usage opportuniste". op. cit., II (Contestations normandes des pouvoirs français et anglais (xiiie – xvie siècle)), II. A (Les Normands contre l'intégration au domaine royal). Symposia (in French). Presses universitaires de Caen. pp. 121–132. ISBN 978-2-84133-811-5. OCLC 7013348105.
- Contamine, Philippe (January 1994). "Chapter 16: The Norman "Nation" and the French "Nation" in the Fourteenth and Fifteenth Centuries". In Bates, David; Curry, Anne (eds.). England and Normandy in the Middle Ages (Proceedings of the conference held at the University of Reading in September 1992). Vol. 1 (1st ed.). Londres and Rio Grande: The Hambledon Press. pp. 215–234. ISBN 1-85285-083-3. OCLC 299458007.
- Floquet, Amable (1843). "La Charte aux Normands". Bibliothèque de l'École des chartes (in French). 4: 42–61. doi:10.3406/bec.1843.451702.
- Martin, Robert (2015). Bazin, Sylvie (ed.). Dictionnaire du moyen français : 1330-1500. Vol. 28 (6th ed.). Nancy: Analyse et traitement informatique de la langue française.
  - Entry "danger" (in French). (meaning A, 6, a), part. tiers et danger)
  - Entry "tiers" (in French). (meaning II, B, 2), part. tiers et danger)
- Musset, Lucien (1969). "Sur les mutations de la monnaie ducale normande au xie siècle : deux documents inédits". Revue numismatique. 6 (in French). 6 (11): 291–293. doi:10.3406/numi.1969.989.
- Neveux, François (2011). "Le contexte historique de la rédaction des coutumiers normands". Annales de Normandie: Revue semestrielle d'études régionales (p. 1st part ("Droit normand : journée d'étude") [proceedings of the study day organized by the Society for the History of Law and Institutions of Western France, held in Bayeux on 13 November 2010]). 61th year (2): 11–22. doi:10.3917/annor.612.0011.
- Plaisse, André (1964). "La forêt de Brix au xve siècle". Annales de Normandie (in French). 14th year (4): 411–443. doi:10.3406/annor.1964.4561.
- Power, Daniel (2009). "II.3. Le régime seigneurial en Normandie (xiie – xiiie siècles)". In Aurell, Martin; Boutoulle, Boutoulle (eds.). Les seigneuries dans l'espace Plantagenêt (c. 1150 – c. 1250) (proceedings of the international colloquium co-organized by the Ausonius Institute for Antiquité et le Moyen ge and the Centre d’études supérieures de civilisation médiévale, held in Bordeaux and Saint-Émilion from 3 to 5 May 2007). Études (n. 24). Vol. 1, 471 (1st ed.). Bordeaux and Saint-Émilion: Ausonius Éditions. pp. 117–136. ISBN 978-2-35613-020-4. OCLC 690334200.
- Rudelle, Odile; Maus, Didier (dir.) (2007). Normandie constitutionnelle, un berceau des droits civiques ? : de la Charte aux Normands (1315) au traité constitutionnel; du prétoire à l'urne (proceedings of the symposium co-organized by the Association française de droit constitutionnel and the Office universitaire d'études normandes de l'université de Caen – Basse-Normandie, and held at the Centre culturel international de Cerisy-la-Salle, in Bayeux and at the Archives départementales de la Manche from 1 to 6 June 2006). Droit public positif / Travaux de l’Association française des constitutionnalistes (in French). Vol. 1, 467 (1st ed.). Paris: Economica. ISBN 978-2-7178-5469-5. OCLC 470805887.
- Sadourny, Alain (2012). "1. Rouen au temps du procès de Jeanne d'Arc (1431-1456)". In Neveux, François (ed.). De l'hérétique à la sainte : les procès de Jeanne d'Arc revisités (proceedings of the symposium organized by the Office universitaire d'études normandes of the University of Caen – Basse-Normandie, and held at the Centre culturel international de Cerisy-la-Salle from 1 to 4 October 2009). Symposia / Colloques de Cerisy (in French). Vol. 1, 343 (1st ed.). Caen: Presses universitaires de Caen. pp. 25–48. ISBN 978-2-84133-421-6. OCLC 835441399.
- Van der Straeten, Joseph (1952). Het Charter en de Raad van Kortenberg [La Charte et le Conseil de Kortenberg]. Recueil de travaux d’histoire et de philologie, 3rd series/Études présentées à la Commission internationale pour l’histoire des assemblées d'états (n. 47 / XIII) (in Dutch). Vol. 1, IX-266 (1st ed.). Louvain: Presses universitaires de Louvain. pp. 193–240. OCLC 490089256.
- Vincent, Nicholas (2015). "Magna Carta (1215) and the Charte aux Normands (1315): Some Anglo-Norman Connections and Correspondences" (PDF). Jersey and Guernsey Law Review. 2: 189–197. Archived (PDF) from the original on 22 February 2019.
- Charte aux Normands, avec ses confirmations (trans. from Latin, with notes) (in French). Vol. 1, 50 (1st ed.). Caen: G. Le Roy. 1788.
