= Banneville =

Banneville may refer to the following places in France:

- Banneville-la-Campagne, a commune of Calvados
- Banneville-sur-Ajon, a commune of Calvados
