= Hueste =

Hueste (in Spanish), hoste (in Portuguese/Galician), host (in Catalan) or ost (in French) was the designation, used in the Iberian Peninsula and France, during the Middle Ages, to refer to a group of armed men under the command of a prelado or rico-hombre, with the objective of executing expeditions or warfare. Huestes were initially drawn from the broader population, but later became more selective as combat skills became more specialized.

== Etymology ==
The terms, in the several Iberian languages, come from the Latin hoste or hostis, meaning "the enemy".

At the start of the Middle Ages, there was no term in the Iberian Peninsula to signify a group of men with military objectives. The Castilian term hueste appeared in the Castilian Siete Partidas of the 13th century, with a meaning similar to the modern Castilian word tropas ("troops"). It had earlier been used in the Kingdom of León in a Fuero at Zamora in 1208 and was used in the charters of Carracedo in 1213, of Sanabria of 1220, Villavicencio of 1221 and Tto of 1222.

The word is also exist in Italian (oste) and Romanian (oaste~oasti) languages, however, in the latter, it is considered an archaic word.

The original meaning of the word in the classical Latin era was "enemy," but it changed during the late Latin period. The reason for this change is that from the 5th century onwards, mainly barbarians - a.k.a. the former enemies - served in the Roman Empire's army. This semantic shift occurred in all the modern-day Romance languages.
