= Exchequer of Normandy =

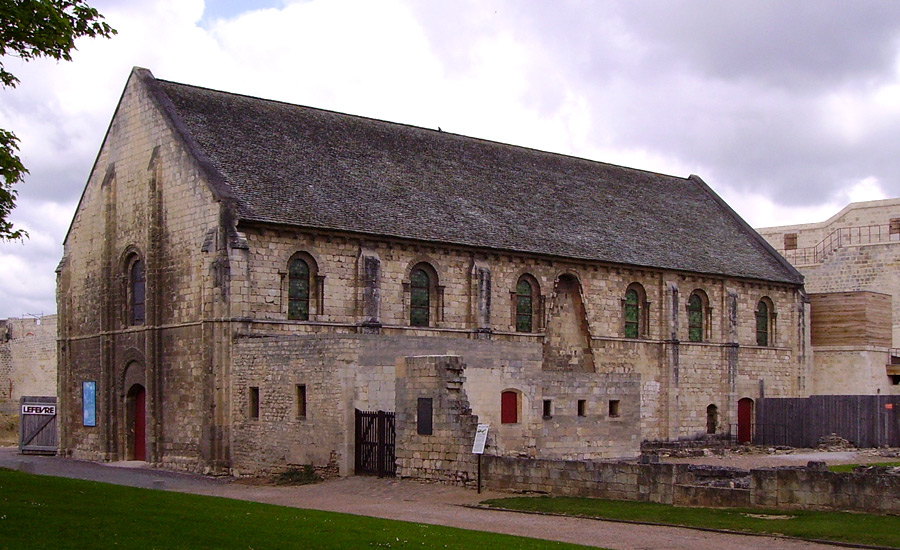
The Salle de l’Échiquier, built in the 12th century in the château de Caen.

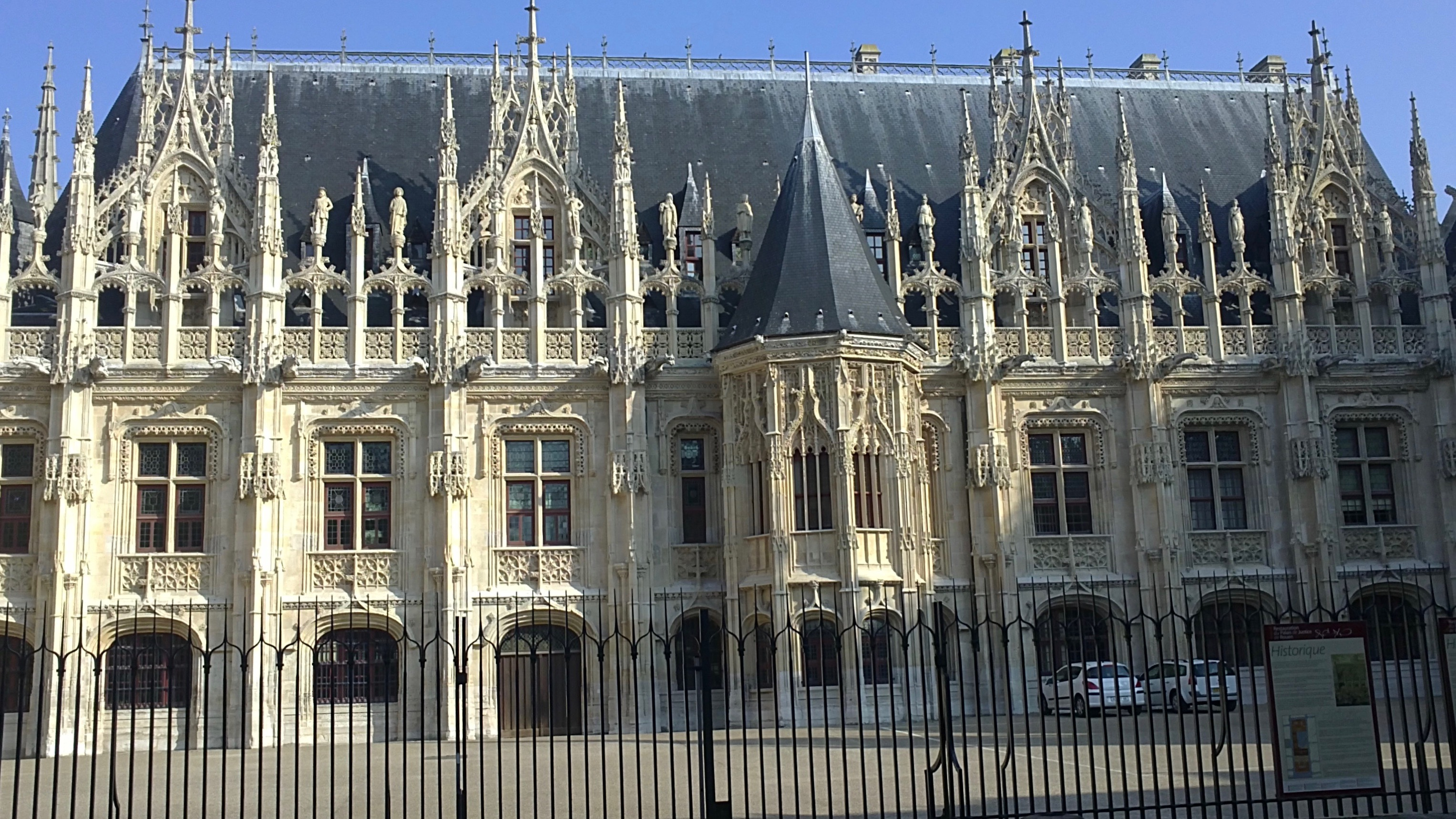
The new Parlement de Normandie in Rouen, which replaced the old exchequer of Normandy in 1508.

The Exchequer of Normandy (Échiquier de Normandie) or Exchequer of Rouen (Échiquier de Rouen) was the fiscal and administrative court of the Duchy of Normandy until the early 16th century.

Surviving records show that the Exchequer of Normandy was operating in 1180, while the English Exchequer existed in 1110. No establishment date is known for either and therefore it is impossible to know which existed first. The Dialogue concerning the Exchequer presents it as a general belief that the Norman kings established the English Exchequer loosely modelled on the Norman one, while noting with some doubt an alternative view that an English Exchequer existed in Anglo-Saxon times.

In 1315 the Norman Barons pressed a new charter, the "Charte aux Normands", on Louis X of France, with the result that the decisions of the Exchequer of Normandy were declared final, meaning that Paris could not overturn decisions made in Rouen, and that the King could not raise a new tax on the Normans without their approval.

The Exchequer of Normandy was later superseded by the Parliament of Normandy in 1508.

== See also ==
- Rouen Courthouse

== Sources ==
- Encyclopédie ou Dictionnaire raisonné des sciences, des arts et des métiers by Diderot & d’Alembert, vol. 5, p. 260.
